= List of bus routes in Taipei =

This list of bus routes in Taipei contains both Taipei Joint Bus and New Taipei City Bus systems. It also includes routes operated by bus companies that are entrusted by basic-level units of Taipei City Government and New Taipei City Government and other for-profit enterprises.

This list uses mostly the Hanyu pinyin spelling system, but the Tongyongm and Wade–Giles systems can also be seen throughout the English naming, therefore townships, districts, street signs, buses and bus stops themselves may use other pinyin systems. While the government has made strides to use the same spellings, different spellings can still be found, i.e., Zhonghe (中和), is spelled as "Jungho" or similar.

Taipei Joint Bus System routes are labeled "Joint", and New Taipei City Bus routes are labeled "NTPC".

== General routes below two digits ==
=== 0 - 99 ===
- With the mark means this route is equipped with low-floor bus.

Route No.	Operating Route	Operator	Remark
Joint 0 East	Neihu - Taipei Main Station	Metropolitan Transport	All equipped
Joint 0 South	Wanfang Community - MRT Dongmen Sta.	Metropolitan Transport	All equipped
Joint 1	Wanhua - Wuxing St.	Shin-Shin Bus	All equipped
Joint 2	Taipei University of Marine Technology - NTU Hospital	Capital Bus	All equipped
Joint 5	Zhonghe - Xingtian Temple	Metropolitan Transport	All equipped
NTPC 8	MRT Xindian Sta. - MRT Jingan Sta.	Taipei Bus	All equipped
Joint 9	Shezi Elementary School - Wanhua	Metropolitan Transport	All equipped
Joint 12	Dongyuan - Mingsheng Community	Metropolitan Transport	Partial equipped
Joint 14	Luzhou - Taipei Main Station	Metropolitan Transport	Partial equipped
Joint 18	Wanhua - MRT Linguang Sta.	Shin-Shin Bus	Partial equipped
Joint 20	Yongchun Senior High School - Youth Park	Metropolitan Transport	All equipped
Joint 21	MRT Yuanshan Sta. - Xihu Library	Capital Bus	All equipped
Joint 22	Wuxing St.- Hengyang Rd.	Metropolitan Transport	All equipped
Joint 26	Shezi - Xingtian Temple	Capital Bus	All equipped
Joint 28	Dazhi - Taipei City Hall	Zhinan Bus	All equipped
Joint 32	Wuxing St. - Nangang Garden Community	Metropolitan Transport	All equipped
Joint 33	Yongchun Senior High School - Dazhi Miramar	Metropolitan Transport	All equipped
Joint 37	Wuxing St. - MRT NTU Hospital Sta.	Metropolitan Transport	All equipped
Joint 38	Huannan Market - Daan Public Housing	Metropolitan Transport	All equipped
Joint 38 Shuttle	Baoxing St.- MRT Longshan Temple Sta.	Metropolitan Transport	
Joint 39	Sanchong - Taipei Main Station	Capital Bus	All equipped
Joint 39 Nightly Bus	Sanchong - Taipei Main Station	Capital Bus	All equipped
Joint 41	Beitou-Shilin Technology Park - MRT Daan Sta.	Metropolitan Transport	Partial equipped
Joint 42	Dazhi - MRT Beimen Sta.	Zhinan Bus	Partial equipped
Joint 42 Shuttle	Dazhi - MRT Yuanshan Sta.	Zhinan Bus	Partial equipped
Joint 46	Songde Rd. - Taipei Circle	Metropolitan Transport	Partial equipped
Joint 49	Jianguo N. Rd. - Dongyuan	Metropolitan Transport	All equipped
NTPC 51	Nanya Depot - Yonghe	Taipei Bus	All equipped
Joint 52	Jingming St. Entrance - TCUH Zhongxing Branch	Shin-Shin Bus	
Joint 53	Longshanlin Community - Xisong High School	Shin-Shin Bus	
NTPC 57	Banqiao - Yonghe	Taipei Bus	All equipped Cross-region mainline bus transferring discount
NTPC 62	Sanchong - Dongyuan	Capital Bus	All equipped
Joint 63	Neihu Jiuzong Rd. - Taipei Main Station	Metropolitan Transport	Partial equipped
Joint 66	MRT Taipei Zoo Sta. - Songshan Station	Shin-Shin Bus	All equipped
Joint 68	Zhoumei Village - MRT Jiantan Sta.	Capital Bus	
Joint 72	Linguang - Dazhi	Kuang-Hua Bus	All equipped
Joint 88	Chongyang Rd. - Taipei Main Station	CitiAir Bus	All equipped
Joint 88 Shuttle	Nangang Garden Community - Taipei Main Station	CitiAir Bus	All equipped
NTPC 99	Banqiao - Xinzhuang	Taipei Bus; Capital Bus	All equipped Cross-region mainline bus transferring discount

== Recreational bus routes ==
=== 108 - 132 ===
Route No.	Operating Route	Operator	Remark
Joint 108	Yangming Mountain - Chingtienkang	Metropolitan Transport	Daily
Joint 109	Wanfang Community - Yangming Mountain 2nd Parkinglot	Metropolitan Transport	Only on weekend or holiday
Joint 111	Xinzhuang - Yangming Mountain 2nd Parkinglot	San Chung Bus	Only on weekend or holiday
Joint 126	Taipei Main Station - Yangming Mountain 2nd Parkinglot	Metropolitan Transport	Only on flowering season
Joint 127	MRT Jiantan Station - Yangming Mountain 2nd Parkinglot	Metropolitan Transport	Only on flowering season
Joint 128	MRT Shipai Station - Yangming Mountain 2nd Parkinglot	San Chung Bus	Only on weekend or holiday
Joint 129	MRT Beitou Station - Yangming Mountain 2nd Parkinglot	San Chung Bus	Only on weekend or holiday
Joint 130	Yangming Mountain 2nd Parkinglot - Yangming Book House	San Chung Bus	Only on flowering season
Joint 130 SHUTTLE	Flower Clock - Yangming Mountain 2nd Parkinglot	San Chung Bus、Metropolitan Transport	Only on flowering season
Joint 131	Yangming Mountain 2nd Parkinglot - Zhuzi Lake	San Chung Bus	Only on flowering season
Joint 132	MRT Zhongxiao Fuxing Station - Dajia Riverbank Park	San Chung Bus; Danan Bus	Only on moon festival and dragon boat festival

== General bus routes of three digits ==
=== 201 - 299 ===
Route No.	Operating Route	Operator	Remark
NTPC 201	Zhonghe - Longshan Temple	Taipei Bus	
Joint 202	Xindian - Dr. Sun Yat-sen Memorial Hall	Zhinan Bus	All equipped
Joint 202 Shuttle	Jinxiu - National Taipei University of Technology	Zhinan Bus	All equipped
Joint 203	Xizhi Shehou - Tianmu	Zhongxing Bus Kuang-Hua Bus	All equipped
Joint 204	Dongyuan - MacArthur New Village	Capital Bus	All equipped
Joint 205	China University of Science and Technology - Dongyuan	Taipei Bus	All equipped
Joint 206	Tianmu - Zhonghua Rd.	Kuang-Hua Bus	All equipped
Joint 207	Neihu - MRT Nanshijiao Sta.	Southeast Bus	All equipped
Joint 208	Xindian - Dazhi	Zhinan Bus	All equipped
Joint 208 Shuttle	Xindian - MRT Gongguan Sta.	Zhinan Bus	All equipped
Joint 208 Express	Dazhi - Xindian	Zhinan Bus	All equipped Via Xinsheng Viaduct
Joint 211	Erchong - MRT Linguang Sta.	Capital Bus	All equipped
Joint 212	Jiuzhuang - Youth Park	CitiAir Bus	All equipped
Joint 212 Express	Jiuzhuang - Youth Park	CitiAir Bus	All equipped
Joint 212 Nightly Bus	Jiuzhuang - Youth Park	CitiAir Bus	All equipped
Joint 214	Zhonghe - Neihu	Zhongxing Bus	All equipped
Joint 214 Express	Zhonghe - Songshan Airport	Zhongxing Bus	All equipped
Joint 215	Taipei University of Maritime Technology - Taipei Main Station	Kuang-Hua Bus	All equipped
Joint 216	Xinbeitou - Taipei Veterans General Hospital	Danan Bus	
Joint 218	Xinbeitou - Wanhua	Danan Bus	Partial equipped Via Wenlin N. Rd.
Joint 218 Shuttle	Xinbeitou - MRT Qiyan Sta.	Danan Bus	Partial equipped
Joint 218 Express	Xinbeitou - Wanhua	Danan Bus	Partial equipped Via Chengde Rd.
Joint 221	Luzhou - Taipei Main Station	San Chung Bus	Partial equipped
Joint 222	Neihu - Hengyang Rd.	Metropolitan Transport	Partial equipped
Joint 223	Guandu - Youth Park	Danan Bus	Partial equipped Via Veterans General Hospital
Joint 224	Tianmu - MRT Shipai Sta.	Kuang-Hua Bus	All equipped
Joint 225	Luzhou - Mingsheng Community	San Chung Bus	Partial equipped
Joint 225 Shuttle	Luzhou - Songshan Airport	San Chung Bus	Partial equipped
Joint 226	Sanchong - Wuxing St.	Capital Bus	All equipped
Joint 227	Sanchong - Yonghe	Zhongxing Bus	All equipped
Joint 227 Shuttle	Sanchong - MRT Mingquan W. Rd. Sta.	Zhongxing Bus	All equipped No services on weekends
Joint 230	MRT Beitou Sta. - Yangming Mountain	Danan Bus	
NTPC 231	Hungkuo Delin University of Technology - MRT Ximen Sta.	Taipei Bus	All equipped
Joint 232	Luzhou - MRT Shandao Temple Sta.	San Chung Bus	Partial equipped
Joint 232 Express	Luzhou - Songshan Station	San Chung Bus	Via Jianguo Viaduct No services on weekends
Joint 234	Banqiao - Ximen	Taipei Bus	All equipped
Joint 235	Xinzhuang - Dr. San Yet-sen Memorial Hall	Capital Bus	All equipped Via Heping E. Rd.
Joint 236 Shuttle	Shenkeng - MRT Gongguan Sta.	Shin-Shin Bus	All equipped
Joint 237	Fude - MRT Dongmen Sta.	Shin-Shin Bus	No services on weekends
Joint 240 Express	Donghu - Dr. San Yet-sen Memorial Hall	Kuang-Hua Bus	No services on weekends
NTPC 241	Zhonghe - Boai Rd.	Taipei Bus	All equipped
NTPC 242	Zhonghe - Ximen	Taipei Bus	No services on weekends
NTPC 243	Zhonghe - Ximen	Taipei Bus	All equipped
NTPC 245	Hungkuo Delin University of Technology - MRT NTU Hospital Sta.	Taipei Bus	All equipped
NTPC 246	Puji Temple - Dongyuan	Kuang-Hua Bus	All equipped
Joint 247	Donghu - Hengyang Rd.	Kuang-Hua Bus	All equipped
Joint 247 Shuttle	Donghu - MRT Yuanshan Sta.	Kuang-Hua Bus	All equipped
NTPC 249	NTUST Hwa Hsia Campus - Taipei Main Station	Shin-Shin Bus	All equipped
Joint 250	Beitou-Shilin Technology Park - Youth Park	Kuang-Hua Bus	No services on weekends
Joint 251	Shenkeng - Taipei Main Station	Shin-Shin Bus	Partial equipped
Joint 251 Shuttle	Shenkeng - MRT Gongguan Sta.	Shin-Shin Bus	Partial equipped
Joint 252	Fude - Taipei Main Station	Shin-Shin Bus	Partial equipped
Joint 253	Jingmei Girls High School - Taipei Main Station	Shin-Shin Bus	Partial equipped
Joint 254	Dapeng New Village - Mingsheng Community	Shin-Shin Bus	Partial equipped
Joint 254 Shuttle	Dapeng New Village - MRT Gongguan Sta.	Shin-Shin Bus	Partial equipped
Joint 255	Shuangxi - Taipei Main Station	Capital Bus	No services on weekends All equipped
Joint 255 Shuttle	Beitou-Shilin Technology Park - Shuangxi	Capital Bus	All equipped
Joint 256	Dazhi - South Songshan	Zhinan Bus	No services on weekends
Joint 257	Xinzhuang Joint Office Tower - Nangang Garden Community	CitiAir Bus	All equipped
Joint 260	Yangming Mountain - Dongyuan	Metropolitan Transport	Partial equipped
Joint 260 Shuttle	Yangming Mountain - Taipei Main Station	Metropolitan Transport	Partial equipped
Joint 260 via Flower Clock	Yangming Mountain - Taipei Main Station	Metropolitan Transport	Partial equipped
Joint 261	Luzhou - Taipei City Hall	San Chung Bus	Partial equipped
Joint 262	Hungkuo Delin University of Technology - Mingsheng Community	CitiAir Bus	All equipped
Joint 262 Shuttle	Zhonghe - Mingsheng Community	Metropolitan Transport	All equipped
Joint 264	Banqiao - MRT Luzhou Sta.	Taipei Bus	All equipped
Joint 265 (Zhongyang Rd.)	Tucheng - Executive Yuan	San Chung Bus	All equipped
Joint 265 (Mingde Rd.)	Tucheng - Executive Yuan	Danan Bus	Partial equipped
Joint 265 Shuttle	Chongqing Junior High School - Executive Yuan	Danan Bus; San Chung Bus	Partial equipped
Joint 265 Nightly Bus	Tucheng - Executive Yuan	San Chung Bus	All equipped
Joint 267	Tianmu - MRT Dahu Park Sta.	Kuang-Hua Bus	All equipped
Joint 268	Dazhi - Tianmu	Kuang-Hua Bus	All equipped No services on weekends
Joint 270	China University of Science and Technology - MRT Ximen Sta.	Metropolitan Transport	All equipped
Joint 270 Shuttle	China University of Science and Technology - United Daily News	Metropolitan Transport	All equipped Start operating on April 21, 2025 No services on weekends
Joint 274	Luzhou - Taipei Main Station	Metropolitan Transport	All equipped
NTPC 275	Hungkuo Delin University of Technology - Songshan Airport	Taipei Bus	All equipped
Joint 276	Jiouzhuang - Hengyang Rd.	Metropolitan Transport	All equipped
Joint 277	Songde Depot - Taipei Veterans General Hospital	Metropolitan Transport	All equipped
Joint 278	MRT Jingmei Sta. - MRT Neihu Sta.	Shin-Shin Bus	All equipped
Joint 278 Shuttle	MRT Jingmei Sta. - Xinyi Village	Shin-Shin Bus	All equipped
Joint 279	Tianmu - Neihu Refuse Incineration Plant	Zhongxing Bus; Kuang-Hua Bus	All equipped
Joint 280	Tianmu - Gongguan	Zhongxing Bus	All equipped
Joint 280 Express	Tianmu - Gongguan	Zhongxing Bus	via Shingsheng Viaduct; All equipped
Joint 281	Donghu - Taipei City Hall	Metropolitan Transport	All equipped
Joint 282	Taipei Zoo - Taipei Circle	Zhinan Bus	All equipped
Joint 284	Xizhi Shehou - Jingmei	Capital Bus	All equipped
Joint 286	Fude St. - Songshan Station	Metropolitan Transport	
Joint 286 Sub-line	Fude St. - Xingtian Temple	Metropolitan Transport	
Joint 287 Shuttle	Donghu - Taipei Bridge	Metropolitan Transport	All equipped
Joint 288	Taipei Children's Amusement Park - Wuxing St.	Danan Bus	Partial equipped
Joint 290 Sub-line	Xinglong - Zhongyang New Village	Shin-Shin Bus	
Joint 292	Erchong - MRT Linguang Sta.	Capital Bus	All equipped
Joint 292 Sub-line	Erchong - MRT Linguang Sta.	Capital Bus	All equipped Via Tonghua St. when towards Erchong
Joint 294	Fude - Renai Junior High School	Shin-Shin Bus	All equipped No services on weekends
Joint 295	Fude - Taipei Main Station	Shin-Shin Bus	
Joint 295 Sub-line	Fude - Taipei Main Station	Shin-Shin Bus	Via Fanglan Rd.
Joint 297	Zhonghe - Chenggong High School	Southeast Bus	All equipped
Joint 298	Wanfang Community - Xingtian Temple	Southeast Bus	All equipped
Joint 299	Yongchun Senior High School - Xinzhuang	Metropolitan Transport; San Chung Bus	Partial equipped

=== 300 - 311 ===
Route No.	Operating Route	Operator	Remark
Joint 300	National Palace Museum - Xiaonanmen	Zhongxing Bus	All equipped
Joint 302	Guandu Temple - Wanhua	Danan Bus	Partial equipped
Joint 302 Shuttle	Guandu Temple - Taipei Children's Amusement Park	Danan Bus	Partial equipped
Joint 303	MRT Jiantan Sta. - Dapingwei	Capital Bus	
Joint 303 Shuttle	MRT Jiantan Sta. - Pingdeng Village	Capital Bus	
Joint 304 Chongqing	National Palace Museum - Yonghe	Zhongxing Bus	All equipped Via Chongqing N. Rd.
Joint 304 Chengde	National Palace Museum - Yonghe	Zhongxing Bus	All equipped Via Chengde Rd.
Joint 306	Luzhou - Lingyun 5th Village	San Chung Bus	Partial equipped
Joint 306	Jiuzhuang - Luzhou	Metropolitan Transport	Partial equipped
Joint 306 Shuttle	Jiuzhuang - Taipei Bridge	Metropolitan Transport	Partial equipped
Joint 307	Banqiao - Fuyuan St.	Taipei Bus Capital Bus	All equipped
Joint 307 Xizang Sanmin	Banqiao - Fuyuan St.	Taipei Bus Capital Bus	All equipped
Joint 308	Tamkang University - MRT Jiantan Sta.	Zhinan Bus	All equipped
Joint 310	Banqiao - Shilin	Taipei Bus	All equipped
Joint 310 Shuttle	Banqiao - Taipei Main Station	Taipei Bus	All equipped
Joint 311	Zhonghe - Songshan	Zhongxing Bus	All equipped
Joint 311 Shuttle	Zhonghe - MRT Gongguan Sta.	Zhongxing Bus	All equipped

=== 505 - 596 ===
Route No.	Operating Route	Operator	Remark
Joint 505	Fuyuan St. - Jingmei	Metropolitan Transport	All equipped
Joint 508	Taishan Public Market - Datong House	San Chung Bus	All equipped
Joint 508 Shuttle	Luzhou - Datong House	Metropolitan Transport; San Chung Bus	Partial equipped
Joint 513	MRT Fu Jen University Sta. - MRT NTU Hospital Sta.	San Chung Bus	
NTPC 520	New Taipei Industrial Park - MRT Minquan W. Rd. Sta.	San Chung Bus	All equipped
Joint 521	Neihu - MRT Zhongxiao Fuxing Sta.	Kuang-Hua Bus	All equipped
Joint 529	Taipei Children's Amusement Park - Shin Kong Hospital	Danan Bus	
Joint 530	Zhinan Temple - MRT Gongguan Sta.	Zhinan Bus	All equipped
Joint 531	Ziyun Village - Songshan Station	Shin-Shin Bus	
Joint 536	Taipei University of Marine Technology - Datong House	Capital Bus	
Joint 536 Shuttle	Taipei University of Marine Technology - Taipei Veterans General Hospital	Capital Bus	
Joint 539	Sanchong - Mackay Memorial Hospital	Capital Bus	All equipped
Joint 542	MRT Yuanshan Sta. - MRT Zhongshan Junior High School Sta.	Capital Bus	No services on weekends
Joint 550	Guandu Temple - Sanwang Temple	Danan Bus	No services on Monday and weekends
Joint 551	Neihu Technology Park - MRT Kunyang Station	Danan Bus	
Joint 552	Jinlong Temple - MRT Taipei City Hall Sta.	Southeast Bus	All equipped
Joint 553	Donghu - Jinlong Temple	Kuang-Hua Bus	
Joint 556	Muzha Xiangtoupu - MRT Jiantan Sta.	Zhinan Bus	All equipped
Joint 557	Soochow University - Shilin High School of Commerce	Zhongxing Bus	All equipped
Joint 559	MRT Shipai Sta. - Yang Ming Chiao Tung University	Metropolitan Transport	
Joint 568	Wanhua - Linguang New Village	Shin-Shin Bus	All equipped
NTPC 570	Shanzhong Lake - Nantianmu Square	Taipei Bus	Previously route F601
NTPC 571	Shanxi Temple - Nantianmu Square	Taipei Bus	Previously route F602
NTPC 572	Jincheng Rd. Entrance - Nantianmu Square	Taipei Bus	Previously route F603 All equipped
NTPC 573	Xinyi Elementary School - Nantianmu Square	Taipei Bus	Previously route F605 All equipped
NTPC 574	Xinyi Elementary School - Nantianmu Square	Taipei Bus	Previously route F606 All equipped
NTPC 575	MRT Yongning Sta. - Nantianmu Square	Taipei Bus	Previously route F607
NTPC 576	MRT Xindian District Office Sta. - Xinhe Elementary School	Shin-Shin Bus	Previously route F702
NTPC 577	Old Banqiao Station - MRT Fuzhong Sta.	Taipei Bus	Previously route F511
NTPC 578	Taishan Public Market - Taipei Main Station	Kuo-Kuang Motor Transportation	Previously route F215 All equipped
NTPC 579	Mingzhi Elementary School - Taipei Main Station	Kuo-Kuang Motor Transportation	Previously route F216 All equipped
NTPC 580	Dake Bridge - Mackay Memorial Hospital	Zhinan Bus	Previously route F221
NTPC 581	Wulin Rd. Entrance - Yushi Rd.	Kuo-Kuang Motor Transportation	Previously route F222 All equipped
NTPC 582	Wugu - Taipei Main Station	Kuo-Kuang Motor Transportation	Previously route F223 All equipped
NTPC 583	Wugu - Veterans General Hospital	Kuo-Kuang Motor Transportation	Previously route F225 All equipped
NTPC 585	Fuzhou Area - MRT Fuzhong Sta.	Taipei Bus	Previously route F502
NTPC 586	Baochang Village - Xizhi Railway Station	New Taipei Bus	Previously route F906
NTPC 587	Xizhi - Switzerland Villa	New Taipei Bus	Previously route F908
NTPC 589	Baifu Community - Nangang Station	New Taipei Bus	Previously route F912
NTPC 590	Nangang Station - Boshi Community	New Taipei Bus	Previously route F917
NTPC 591	Nangang Station - Lotus Hill	New Taipei Bus	Previously route F918
NTPC 592	Baoxing Rd. - MRT Qizhang Sta.	Shin-Shin Bus	Previously route F705
NTPC 593	MRT Tamsui Sta. - Shalun	Tamsui Bus	Previously route F112
NTPC 594	MRT Tamsui Sta. - Tamkang University	Tamsui Bus	Previously route F110
NTPC 595	MRT Tamsui Sta. - Danhai New Town	Tamsui Bus	Previously route F111
NTPC 596	Shulin - Banqiao	Taipei Bus	Previously route F501

=== 600 - 688 ===
Route No.	Operating Route	Operator	Remark
Joint 600	Nangang Vocational High School - Taipei Main Station	Zhongxing Bus; Kuang-Hua Bus	All equipped
Joint 602	Tianmu - Beitou	Zhongxing Bus; Danan Bus	Partial equipped
Joint 604	Banqiao - Taipei Main Station	Taipei Bus	All equipped Via Wanban Bridge, Xizang Rd.
Joint 605	Xizhi - Taipei Main Station	Zhongxing Bus	All equipped
Joint 605 Sub-line	Xizhi - Songshan Station	Zhongxing Bus	All equipped Via Chongyang Rd., CTV
Joint 605 Xintaiwu Rd.	Xizhi - Taipei Main Station	Zhongxing Bus	All equipped Via Downtown Xizhi, Xintaiwu Rd.
Joint 605 Express	Xizhi - Taipei Main Station	Zhongxing Bus	Via National Freeway 1, Nanjing E. Rd.
Joint 606	Wanfang Community - Taipei Veterans General Hospital	Metropolitan Transport	All equipped
Joint 611	Taipei Zoo - Songshan Station	Shin-Shin Bus	Partial equipped
Joint 612	Songde Depot - Datong House	Metropolitan Transport	All equipped
Joint 615	Danfeng - Taipei Main Station	San Chung Bus	
Joint 616	Taishan - Tianmu	Zhongxing Bus	All equipped
Joint 617	Taishan - Neihu	San Chung Bus	All equipped Not stopping at Songshan Airport
Joint 617 Sub-line	Taishan - Neihu	San Chung Bus	All equipped Stopping at Songshan Airport
Joint 618	Xinzhuang - Shilin	Capital Bus	All equipped
Joint 621	Erchong - MRT NTU Hospital Sta.	Capital Bus	All equipped
Joint 622	Taishan - MRT Zhongshan Sta.	San Chung Bus	
NTPC 624	Xindian - Ximen	Taipei Bus	All equipped Cross-region mainline bus transferring discount Via Taipei Bus Xindian Depot
NTPC 624 Luye Xiangpo	Xindian - Ximen	Taipei Bus	All equipped Cross-region mainline bus transferring discount Via Luye Xiangpo Community
NTPC 629	Xizhi - Songshan Station	New Taipei Bus	Partial equipped
NTPC 629 Shuttle	Wudu - Xizhi Shehou	New Taipei Bus	Partial equipped
Joint 630	Dongyuan - Donghu	Shin-Shin Bus; Metropolitan Transport	All equipped
NTPC 631	Tamsui - Beitou	Tamsui Bus	
NTPC 635	Huilong - Taipei	San Chung Bus	All equipped Via Zhongzheng Rd. of Xinzhuang
NTPC 636	Zhongzheng Rd. of Shulin - MRT Zhongshan Sta.	San Chung Bus	All equipped
NTPC 637	Wugu - Taipei	San Chung Bus	All equipped
NTPC 638	Wugu - MRT Nanjing Fuxing Sta.	San Chung Bus	All equipped Via Mingzhi Rd.
NTPC 638 Shuttle	Wugu - MRT Fu Jen University Sta.	San Chung Bus	All equipped Via Maoshang Public Housing, FJCU Hospital
NTPC 639	Shulin - Beimen	San Chung Bus	
NTPC 640	Wugu - MRT NTU Hospital Sta.	San Chung Bus	All equipped
Joint 641	Wugukeng - Taipei Main Station	San Chung Bus	
Joint 643	Jinxiu Sanzhuang - Fuxing N. Village	Xindian Bus	All equipped
Joint 644	Qingtan - Boai Rd.	Xindian Bus	All equipped
Joint 645	Jiuzhuang - MRT Shipai Sta.	San Chung Bus	All equipped
Joint 645 Sub-line	China University of Science and Technology - MRT Shipai Sta.	San Chung Bus	All equipped
Joint 646	Donghu - MRT Jiantan Sta.	Shin-Shin Bus	
Joint 647	Daqijiao - MRT Taipei City Hall Sta.	Xindian Bus	All equipped Via Xinyi Exp. Way
Joint 648	Jinxiu Sanzhuang - Taipei Main Station	Xindian Bus	All equipped
Joint 651	Banqiao - Taipei City Hall	Taipei Bus	All equipped
Joint 652	Xinzhuang - Neihu	Metropolitan Transport	Partial equipped
NTPC 656	Hungkuo Delin University of Technology - MRT NTU Hospital Sta.	Taipei Bus	All equipped Via Wenhua Rd. of Banqiao
NTPC 657	Hungkuo Delin University of Technology - Jiangzicui	Taipei Bus	All equipped Partial shifts via Yanhe Rd. of Tucheng
NTPC 658	Banqiao - Ximen	Taipei Bus	All equipped
Joint 660	Shenkeng - Taipei Circle	Zhinan Bus	All equipped
Joint 660 Shuttle	Shenkeng - Jingmei	Zhinan Bus	All equipped
Joint 662	Sanchong - Taipei First Girls High School	Capital Bus	All equipped No services on weekends
Joint 663	Xinzhuang - Dr. Sun Yat-sen Memorial Hall	Capital Bus	All equipped
NTPC 666	Jingmei - Wutuku	Shin-Shin Bus	
NTPC 666	Jingmei - Huangdi Temple	Shin-Shin Bus	
NTPC 666	Jingmei - Huafan University	Shin-Shin Bus	
NTPC 667	Banqiao - Taipei Main Station	Taipei Bus	All equipped Cross-region mainline bus transferring discount
Joint 668	Xizhi - Gongguan	Zhongxing Bus	All equipped Via Songshan Station
Joint 669	Sanchong - Taipei City Hall	Capital Bus	All equipped Via Civic Blvd. (on surface road)
Joint 670	NTUST Hwa Hsia Campus - Taipei Main Station	Shin-Shin Bus	Partial equipped
Joint 671	Jingmei Girls High School - Taipei Main Station	Shin-Shin Bus	All equipped
Joint 672	Dapeng New Village - Minsheng Community	Shin-Shin Bus	Partial equipped
Joint 672 Shuttle	Dapeng New Village - MRT Gongguan Sta.	Shin-Shin Bus	Partial equipped Extra shift for peak hour in the morning
Joint 673	Dapeng New Village - Dongyuan	Shin-Shin Bus	
Joint 675	Xizhi - Gongguan	Zhongxing Bus	Partial equipped Via Huandong Blvd., Nanjing E. Rd.
Joint 676	Taipei Zoo - Xingtian Temple	Zhinan Bus	
NTPC 677	Xizhi Shehou - Jinlong Temple	Kuang-Hua Bus	Via Kangning St.
NTPC 677 Sub-line	Xizhi Shehou - Jinlong Temple	Kuang-Hua Bus	Via Mingfeng St.
NTPC 678	Xizhi - MRT Taipei City Hall Sta.	New Taipei Bus	Partial equipped No services on weekends
Joint 679	MRT Taipei Zoo Sta. - Nangang Station	Zhinan Bus	All equipped
Joint 680	Linguang - Tianmu	Kuang-Hua Bus	All equipped
Joint 681	Donghu - Yangming Mountain	Kuang-Hua Bus	All equipped
Joint 682	Bali - Shezi	Tamsui Bus	All equipped
Joint 683	Hougang Village - Nangang Vocational High School	Kuang-Hua Bus	All equipped
Joint 685	Linguang New Village - Tianmu	Metropolitan Transport	All equipped Partial shifts via Jilin Rd.
Joint 688	Jianguo N. Rd. - Zhonghe Chenggong Rd.	Metropolitan Transport	Partial equipped

=== 701 - 711 ===
Route No.	Operating Route	Operator	Remark
Joint 701	Huilong (迴龍) - Taipei	Taipei Bus	passing by Shulin Station side platform
Joint 702	Sanxia - Taipei	Taipei Bus	passing by Yingge and National Taiwan University of Arts
Joint 703	Sanxia - Taipei	Taipei Bus	passing by Ganyuan Area (柑園地區), Shulin District
Joint 703 vice-line	Sanxia - Taipei	Taipei Bus	passing by Zhongyang Rd. Tucheng District
Joint 704	Bali - Beimen	San Chung Bus	
Joint 705	Sanxia - Taipei	Taipei Bus	passing by New Banqiao Station and Guangfu Bridge
Joint 706	Sanxia - Taipei	Taipei Bus	passing by Shanghe and MRT Dingxi Station
Joint 711	Xizhi - Songjiang Rd.	Zhongxing Bus	

=== 801 - 848 ===
Route No.	Operating Route	Operator	Remark
NTPC 801	Wugu - Songshan Airport	Zhinan Bus	直行Wugu成泰路
NTPC 802	三峽 - MRT Xinpu Station	Capital Bus	
NTPC 802（區間車）	Xinzhuang - MRT Xinpu Station	Capital Bus	
NTPC 803	Wugu - Songshan Airport	Zhinan Bus	行經貿商二村、泰山泰林路
NTPC 805	土城 - Wugu	Taipei Bus; San Chung Bus	
NTPC 806	Banqiao - Luzhou	Taipei Bus; San Chung Bus	
NTPC 807	三峽 - 熊空	Taipei Bus	
NTPC 808	瑞芳 - 猴硐	Keelung Bus	
NTPC 810	土城 - 迴龍	San Chung Bus	
NTPC 811	Luzhou - Taipei市中興 Hospital	San Chung Bus	
NTPC 812	三峽 - MRT Ximen Station	Taipei Bus	
NTPC 813	Wugu - Zhonghe	Zhinan Bus; Kuang-Hua Bus	全配Low floor
NTPC 815	Sanchong商工 - MRT Shilin Station	Zhongxing Bus	行經Sanchong力行路
NTPC 816	Sanchong商工 - MRT Shilin Station	Zhongxing Bus	行經Luzhou Zhongshan一、二路
NTPC 817	Xizhi - 五分埔	New Taipei Bus	
NTPC 818	聖約翰科大 - MRT 紅Shulin Station	Tamshui Bus	
NTPC 819	深美橋 - MRT 七張 Station	Shin-Shin Bus	
NTPC 825	瑞芳 - 金瓜石	Keelung Bus	例假日 行駛
NTPC 826	九號停車場 - 水湳洞	Keelung Bus	例假日行駛
NTPC 827	瑞芳 - 福山宮	Keelung Bus	
NTPC 828	金山 Hospital - 法鼓山	Keelung Bus	行經金山三界壇路
NTPC 829	金山 Hospital - 法鼓山	Keelung Bus	行經金山清水路
NTPC 833（鶯歌）	鶯歌(陶博館) - 鶯歌(陶瓷老街)	Taipei Bus	三鶯文化巴士, 例假日行駛
NTPC 833（三峽）	鶯歌 (陶博館) - 三峽(客家文化園區)	Taipei Bus	三鶯文化巴士, 例假日行駛
NTPC 835	Wugu工業區 - MRT -{台}-大 Hospital Station	San Chung Bus	
NTPC 836	MRT Tamsui Station - Tamsui Fisherman's Wharf	Zhinan Bus	Tamsui古蹟園區遊園bus
NTPC 837	淡海 - 福德 Village	Tamshui Bus	例假日行駛至漁人碼頭
NTPC 838	泰山 - MRT Guandu Station	Zhinan Bus	
NTPC 839	達觀 Community - MRT Xindian Station	Danan Bus	
NTPC 840	Banqiao溪崑 - MRT Banqiao Station	Taipei Bus	
NTPC 841	Banqiao浮洲 - MRT Banqiao Station	Taipei Bus	
NTPC 842	Xinzhuang - MRT Xinpu Station	Capital Bus	行經Xinzhuang市建福路
NTPC 843	Shulin - MRT Fuzhong Station	Taipei Bus	行經Shulin市Daan路
NTPC 845	Xinzhuang - MRT Xinpu Station	Capital Bus; Taipei Bus	行經Xinzhuang市幸福路
NTPC 846	瑞芳 - Pingxi	Keelung Bus	
NTPC 848	Taipei區監理所 - Banqiao公 Station	Taipei Bus	

== Express Bus Routes ==
=== 902 - 929 ===
※一部分己經不是快速bus

Route No.	Operating Route	Operator	Remark
Joint 902	Wanfang Community - VG	Zhinan Bus	無行經任何高、快速道路。敦化新幹線, 行經Dazhi, 全配Low floor
Joint 902 區間車	Wanfang Community - MRT 劍南路 Station	Zhinan Bus	全配Low floor
Joint 903	東hu - MRT Zhongxiao Fuxing Station	Shin-Shin Bus	無行經任何高、快速道路
Joint 905	錦繡 - 民生 Community	Zhinan Bus	行經水源快速道路
Joint 905 副線	錦繡 - 民生 Community	Zhinan Bus	行經Xindian安和路、中安大橋
Joint 906	錦繡 - Songshan Airport	Hsintien Bus	行經水源快速道路
Joint 906 綠線	錦繡 - Songshan Airport	Hsintien Bus	行經Xindian安和路、中安大橋
Joint 907	Wanhua - Xizhi	Shin-Shin Bus	行經國道3號(福高)
NTPC 908	三峽 - MRT 景安 Station	Taipei Bus	行經 國道3號 (福高)
Joint 909	錦繡 - Songshan Airport	Hsintien Bus	行經中國玫瑰城 Community、北新路、Xindian中華路
Joint 910	三峽 - MRT Fuzhong Station	Taipei Bus	行經國道3號(福高)
Joint 912	深坑 - MRT Taipei City Hall Station	Zhinan Bus	行經Xinyi快速道路
Joint 915	MRT 景美 Station - MRT Taipei City Hall Station	Shin-Shin Bus	行經Xinyi快速道路
NTPC 916	三峽(Taipei大學) - 土城(MRT Yongning Station)	Taipei Bus; Capital Bus	行經國道3號(福高)
NTPC 917	鶯歌 - 土城	Taipei Bus	行經國道3號(福高)
NTPC 918	泰山 - Xindian	Zhinan Bus、Zhongxing Bus	行經 台64線 快速公路
NTPC 919	五堵 - MRT Zhongxiao Fuxing Station	New Taipei Bus	行經環東大道
NTPC 920	Linkou - Banqiao	Taipei Bus	行經 國道1號( Zhongshan高)
NTPC 921	三峽 - MRT 景安 Station	Taipei Bus	行經北大 Community、國道3號 (福高)
NTPC 922	三峽 - MRT Yongning Station	Taipei Bus	行經北大 Community、國道3號 (福高)
NTPC 923	Pinglin - Xindian	Hsintien Bus	行經 國道3號 (福高)、國道5號 (渭水高)
NTPC 925	Linkou - Sanchong	Taipei Bus	預計9月1 日通車
NTPC 926	Banqiao - Sanchong	Taipei Bus	行經 新北大橋, 預計配置Low floor 預計9月1日通車
NTPC 927	Sanchong - Bali	Capital Bus	預計9月1 日通車
NTPC 928	Bali - Wugu工業區	Tamshui Bus	預計9月1日通車
NTPC 929	Bali - Sanchong	San Chung Bus	預計9月1 日通車

== Trunk Line bus routes (Numbered by text) ==
Route No.	Operating Route	Operator	Remark
Rapid bus	Taipei Municipal Jingmei Girls' Senior High School - VG	Shin-Shin Bus	charged as two section through the whole route

== MRT ShuttleBus routes ==
=== Brown Line Shuttle bus ===
Route No.	Operating Route	Operator	Remark
Joint BR1	Songshan Station - Songshan Airport	Capital Bus	配有2輛Low floor
Joint BR2	景美女中 - Wanfang Community	Shin-Shin Bus	
Joint BR3	MRT Taipei Zoo Station - 萬美 Community	Shin-Shin Bus	
Joint BR5	Wanfang Community - 指南宮	Southeast Bus	
Joint BR6	MRT Taipei Zoo Station - MRT Taipei City Hall Station	Shin-Shin Bus	經羅斯福路
Joint BR7	Xindian - Taipei City Hall	Taipei Bus	部分班次行駛至綠野香坡
Joint BR9	東hu - 圓環	Capital Bus	南京新幹線, Low floor
Joint BR10	東hu - MRT 南京東路 Station	Southeast Bus	
Joint BR11	MRT Taipei Zoo Station - MRT Gongguan Station	Shin-Shin Bus	
Joint BR11 副線	MRT Taipei Zoo Station - 興福國中	Shin-Shin Bus	行經政大二街、政大三街
Joint BR12	MRT 景美 Station - 兒童交通博物館	Shin-Shin Bus	
Joint BR13	雙溪 - MRT Dazhi Station	Capital Bus	
Joint BR15	MRT Taipei Zoo Station - Maokong	Shin-Shin Bus	
Joint BR16	Taipei花市 - Songshan Airport	Danan Bus	
Joint BR18	政治大學 - MRT Taipei City Hall Station	Shin-Shin Bus	
Joint BR19	大hu山莊 - MRT Kunyang Station	Southeast Bus	

=== Red Line Shuttle bus ===
Route No.	Operating Route	Operator	Remark
Joint R2	北峰 Village - MRT 圓山 Station	Kuang-Hua Bus	
Joint R3	Taipei花市 - 科學教育館	Kuang-Hua Bus	
Joint R5	Yangmingshan - MRT Jiantan Station	Metropolitan Transport	
Joint R7	MRT Jiantan Station - 社子	Capital Bus	
Joint R7 區間車	社子 - MRT Jiantan Station	Capital Bus	
Joint R9	Luzhou - MRT Jiantan Station	San Chung Bus	
Joint R10	Taipei海院 - MRT Jiantan Station	Kuang-Hua Bus	
Joint R12	科學教育館 - MRT Shipai Station	Zhongxing Bus	
NTPC R13	Bali - MRT Guandu Station	Tamshui Bus	行經 十三行博物館
Joint R15	Tianmu - 社子	Zhongxing Bus	行經MRT Shilin Station
Joint R19	Tianmu - MRT Shipai Station	Kuang-Hua Bus	
NTPC R22	Bali - MRT Guandu Station	Tamshui Bus	
NTPC R23	漁人碼頭 - MRT 紅Shulin Station	San Chung Bus	
Joint R25	Nangang - MRT Zhongshan Station	Capital Bus	配有1輛Low floor
NTPC R26	漁人碼頭 - MRT Tamsui Station	Zhinan Bus	
NTPC R27	MRT Tamsui Station - Tamkang University(側門外)	Zhinan Bus	
NTPC R28	MRT Tamsui Station - Tamkang University(正門內)	Tamshui Bus	
Joint R29	Neihu - MRT Minquan W. Rd. Station	Southeast Bus	
Joint R30	NPM - MRT Jiantan Station	Zhongxing Bus	經National Palace Museum院區(配合NPM開放時間營運), 全配Low floor
Joint R30 區間車	NPM - 科學教育館	Zhongxing Bus	不經National Palace Museum院區, 全配Low floor
Joint R31	金龍路 - MRT 民權西路 Station	San Chung Bus	
Joint R32	Nangang - Taipei Bridge	Capital Bus	民權新幹線, 全配Low floor
Joint R33	葫蘆Temple - 中興 Hospital	Capital Bus	
Joint R34	MRT 圓山 Station - 大佳河濱公園	Capital Bus	例假日行駛 暫不營運
Joint R35	Guandu Wharf - 北台灣學院	Danan Bus	行經MRT Guandu Station、Taipei藝術大學
NTPC R36	新春街 - MRT Tamsui Station	Tamshui Bus	
NTPC R37	正德國中 - MRT Tamsui Station	Tamshui Bus	
NTPC R38	淡海新市鎮 - MRT Tamsui Station	Tamshui Bus	
NTPC R38（區間車）	真理大學 - MRT Tamsui Station	Tamshui Bus	
NTPC R39	新春街 - MRT Tamsui Station	Tamshui Bus	

=== Orange Line Shuttle bus ===
Route No.	Operating Route	Operator	Remark
NTPC O1	綿繡－MRT 景安 Station	Zhinan Bus	
NTPC O2	Zhonghe Station－秀山國小	Taipei Bus	配有8輛Low floor
NTPC O3	Zhonghe Station－MRT 頂溪 Station	Taipei Bus	
NTPC O5	Banqiao 國中－MRT 景安 Station	Taipei Bus	行經署立雙和 Hospital, 配有9輛Low floor
NTPC O9	錦繡－雙和 Hospital	Zhinan Bus	行經彩蝶別墅、署立雙和 Hospital
NTPC O10	泰山－MRT Luzhou Station	Zhinan Bus	行經永安大橋
NTPC O12	二重－MRT Sanchong國小 Station	Capital Bus	
NTPC O13	Sanchong－Wugu	Capital Bus	行經MRT 徐匯中學 Station
NTPC O16	興珍村－MRT 三民高中 Station	中興巴士	經MRT Luzhou Station
NTPC O17	Wugu工業區－Sanchong	大都會客運	經MRT Luzhou、三民高中、徐匯中學 Station
NTPC O18	Luzhou－Sanchong高中	大都會客運	行經MRT 三民高中、徐匯中學 Station
NTPC O19	Wugu－Sanchong	Sanchong Bus	行經三民路、Sanchong高中、MRT Luzhou、三民高中、徐匯中學 Station
NTPC O20	觀音山－Luzhou	Sanchong Bus	行經MRT Luzhou、三民高中 Station

=== Green Line Shuttle bus ===
Route No.	Operating Route	Operator	Remark
Joint G1	MRT Xindian Station - TaipeiTaipei City Hall	Taipei Bus	部分班次延駛Xindian市安康路
Joint G2 左線	景美女中 - 中、Yonghe	Shin-Shin Bus	景平路→成功路
Joint G2 右線	景美女中 - 中、Yonghe	Shin-Shin Bus	成功路→景平路
NTPC G3	花園新城 - Zhonghe	Hsintien Bus	
NTPC G5	大崎腳 - 大鵬華城	Hsintien Bus	
NTPC G6	美之城 - Zhonghe	Hsintien Bus	
NTPC G7	黎明清境 - MRT Dapinglin Station	Hsintien Bus	
NTPC G8	Taipei小城 - Zhonghe	Hsintien Bus	
NTPC G9	大香山 - 慈濟 Hospital	Danan Bus	
NTPC G9（區間車）	大香山 - 北新國小	Danan Bus	部分班次從大千豪景發車或不經大千豪景
NTPC G9（專車）	大香山 - 耕莘 Hospital	Danan Bus	
NTPC G10	景文科技大學 - MRT Dapinglin Station	Hsintien Bus	
Joint G11	Wanfang Community - Taipower Building	Southeast Bus	
NTPC G13	青潭 - Gongguan	Hsintien Bus	
NTPC G15	綠野香坡 - MRT Dapinglin Station	Hsintien Bus	

=== Blue Line Shuttle bus ===
Route No.	Operating Route	Operator	Remark
Joint BL1	徐匯中學 - Taipei Main Station	San Chung Bus	
Joint BL2	Xinzhuang - MRT Ximen Station	Capital Bus	
Joint BL5	挹翠山莊 - MRT Taipei City Hall Station	Metropolitan Transport	
Joint BL7	Dazhi - MRT Taipei City Hall Station	Kuang-Hua Bus	部分班次繞駛麥帥新城
Joint BL7 區間車	Dazhi - 舊宗路	Kuang-Hua Bus	未行經Taipei MRT 藍線任何 Station
Joint BL10	民生 Community - Nangang國宅	Capital Bus	
Joint BL12	東hu - MRT Kunyang Station	Metropolitan Transport	行經Zhongxiao東路七段(MRT Nangang Station)
NTPC BL15	Xizhi - MRT Kunyang Station	Zhongxing Bus	
NTPC BL17	五福新村 - 土城	Taipei Bus	
NTPC BL18	Zhonghe - Xinzhuang	Taipei Bus; Capital Bus	
Joint BL20	德明科大 - MRT Kunyang Station	Kuang-Hua Bus	行經Neihu焚化廠
Joint BL20 區間車	Dazhi - MRT Kunyang Station	Kuang-Hua Bus	
NTPC BL21	社-{后}- - MRT Kunyang Station	Kuang-Hua Bus	行經Xizhi市中興路
NTPC BL22	Xizhi - Nangang國宅	New Taipei Bus	
NTPC BL23	社-{后}- - MRT Kunyang Station	Kuang-Hua Bus	行經Xizhi市樟樹一、二路
Joint BL25	中華科技大學 - MRT Kunyang Station	CitiAir Bus	
Joint BL26	舊宗路 - MRT Taipei City Hall Station	San Chung Bus	
Joint BL27	Neihu - MRT Taipei City Hall Station	Danan Bus	
Joint BL28	興隆 Station - 東園	Shin-Shin Bus	
Joint BL29	東園 - 中華路北 Station	Shin-Shin Bus	行經 Taipei市立聯合 Hospital 中興院區
NTPC BL31	五福新村 - 後埔 Station	Taipei Bus	
NTPC BL32	Xinyi國小 - 縣立 Hospital	Taipei Bus	
NTPC BL33	五福新村 - MRT Banqiao Station	Taipei Bus	
NTPC BL35	歡仔園 - MRT Xinpu Station	Taipei Bus	
Joint BL36	Xizhi社后 - MRT Kunyang Station	Capital Bus	
NTPC BL37	迴龍 - MRT Banqiao Station	San Chung Bus	
NTPC BL38	Shulin - MRT Banqiao Station	San Chung Bus	
NTPC BL40	土城 - 華克山莊	Taipei Bus	
NTPC BL41	MRT 海山 Station - 駕訓中心	Keelung Bus	實際上起 Station為『員福 Village (Keelung Bus土城 Station) 』
NTPC BL43	三峽柑園 - 土城 (MRT Yongning Station)	Taipei Bus	
NTPC BL44	Shulin - 土城 (MRT Yongning Station)	Taipei Bus	平日部分班次行駛至土城南Tianmu地區
NTPC BL45	成福 - 土城 (MRT Yongning Station)	Taipei Bus	
NTPC BL46	二鬮 - 土城 (MRT Yongning Station)	Taipei Bus	有二輛配車可載運 自行車

== Small bus routes ==
Route No.	Operating Route	Operator	Remark
Joint 小1	內溝 - 中華科技大學	Southeast Bus	
Joint 小1 區間車	內溝 - MRT Kunyang Station	Southeast Bus	部分班次繞行至 康寧護專、五分街
Joint 小2	石崁 - MRT Taipei City Hall Station	Southeast Bus	
Joint 小2 區間車	石崁 - 國立台灣戲曲學院	Southeast Bus	
Joint 小3	MRT Kunyang Station - 翠柏新村	Southeast Bus	
Joint 小3 區間車	MRT Kunyang Station - 清白 Village	Southeast Bus	
Joint 小5	MRT Kunyang Station - 光明Temple	Southeast Bus	部分班次僅行駛至茶葉製造示範場
Joint 小5 區間車	MRT Kunyang Station - 大坑	Southeast Bus	
Joint 小6	Beitou - 清天宮	Danan Bus	
Joint 小7	Beitou - 嶺頭	Danan Bus	部分班次返程行經嶺腳或新民路
Joint 小8	MRT Shipai Station - 竹子hu	Danan Bus	
Joint 小9	Beitou - 竹子hu	Danan Bus	行經新民路
Joint 小10	Wanfang Community - Maokong	Southeast Bus	
Joint 小11	Wanfang Community - 大春山莊	Southeast Bus	部分班次繞駛至救千宮
Joint 小12	MRT Kunyang Station - Muzha Taipei Zoo	Southeast Bus	部分班次僅行駛至 富德公墓
Joint 小12 區間車	MRT Kunyang Station - 中華科技大學	Southeast Bus	
Joint 小14	Beitou - 照明Temple(情人廟)	Danan Bus	
Joint 小15	MRT Jiantan Station - 擎天崗	Capital Bus	
Joint 小15 區間車	MRT Jiantan Station - 菁山露營地	Capital Bus	
Joint 小16	MRT Jiantan Station - Gongguan Village	Capital Bus	部分班次繞行經永公路巷道、建賢街、菁山小鎮或Yangmingshan國小
Joint 小17	MRT Jiantan Station - 新安 Village	Capital Bus	部分班次繞駛至指福宮
Joint 小18	MRT Jiantan Station - 聖人瀑布	Capital Bus	
Joint 小18 區間車	MRT Jiantan Station - National Palace Museum	Capital Bus	
Joint 小19	MRT Jiantan Station - Pingdeng Village	Capital Bus	部分班次繞駛至合誠Temple
Joint 小21	Beitou - 八仙 Village	Danan Bus	
Joint 小22	MRT Beitou Station - 泉源路	Danan Bus	
Joint 小23	Guandu Wharf - Beitou	Danan Bus	行經Tamsui自強路
Joint 小25	MRT Beitou Station - 六窟	Danan Bus	
Joint 小26	Beitou - 頂hu	Danan Bus	

== Citizens' minibus routes ==
(市民小巴)

Route No.	Operating Route	Operator	Remark
Joint 市民小巴1	MRT Jiantan Station - 風櫃嘴	Capital Bus	Shilin區市民小巴M1線；原為小型 bus小27線
Joint 市民小巴2	MRT Beitou Station - 溫泉路	Danan Bus	Beitou區市民小巴M2線
Joint 市民小巴3	Yangmingshan - 新園街	Metropolitan Transport	Shilin區市民小巴M3線
Joint 市民小巴5	MRT 景美 Station - 興光市場	Shin-Shin Bus	文山區市民小巴M5線
Joint 市民小巴6	舊庄 - MRT Kunyang Station	Metropolitan Transport; Danan Bus	Nangang區市民小巴M6線；部分班次駛至山豬窟游泳池
Joint 市民小巴7	麟光新村 - MRT Taipei City Hall Station	Metropolitan Transport	Xinyi區市民小巴M7線
Joint 市民小巴8	洲美 Station - 後港 Village	Kuang-Hua Bus	Shilin區市民小巴M8線
Joint 市民小巴9	大佳河濱公園 - 中興 Hospital	San Chung Bus	Zhongshan區市民小巴M9線
Joint 市民小巴10	麥帥新城 - 三民國中	Capital Bus	Neihu區市民小巴M10線
Joint 市民小巴11	Tianmu - MRT 芝山 Station	Kuang-Hua Bus	Shilin區市民小巴M11線

== Themed bus routes ==
Route No.	Operating Route	Operator	Remark
Dadaocheng Bank bus	國賓飯店 - 民生西寧路口	Taipei Bus	
Maokong Tour bus Right Line	Maokong Gondola Station - 三玄宮	Shin-Shin Bus	逢Maokong Gondola行駛時行駛
懷恩專車(Gongguan、六張犁線)	MRT Gongguan Station→第二殯儀館→MRT 六張犁 Station→第二殯儀館	Taipei Bus	Taipei市殯葬管理處自行招標routes
懷恩專車(Zhongxiao Fuxing Line)	MRT Zhongxiao Fuxing Station - 第二殯儀館	Taipei Bus	Taipei市殯葬管理處自行招標routes

== Parks Commuters Bus routes ==
=== Neihu Technology Park ===
Route No.	Operating Route	Operator	Remark
Joint NTP Commuter Bus 圓山	MRT 圓山 Station－Neihu Technology Park	Metropolitan Transport; Kuang-Hua Bus; Capital Bus	直達車
Joint NTP Commuter Bus 市府	MRT Taipei City Hall Station－Neihu Technology Park	Danan Bus; Kuang-Hua Bus; San Chung Bus; Southeast Bus	直達車
Joint NTP Commuter Bus 1	Zhonghe高中－Neihu Technology Park	Zhongxing Bus	
Joint NTP Commuter Bus 2	Zhonghe高中－Neihu Technology Park	Zhongxing Bus	
Joint NTP Commuter Bus 3	駕訓中心－Neihu Technology Park	Metropolitan Transport; Taipei Bus	
Joint NTP Commuter Bus 5	MRT Taipei City Hall Station－Neihu Technology Park	Southeast Bus	
Joint NTP Commuter Bus 6	Luzhou－Neihu Technology Park	San Chung Bus	
Joint NTP Commuter Bus 7	Xizhi－Neihu Technology Park	New Taipei Bus	
Joint NTP Commuter Bus 8	Songshan Station－Neihu Technology Park	Kuang-Hua Bus	
Joint NTP Commuter Bus 9	MRT Zhongshan國中 Station－Neihu Technology Park	Southeast Bus	
Joint NTP Commuter Bus 10	錦繡－Neihu Technology Park	Zhinan Bus	
Joint NTP Commuter Bus 11	Xinzhuang－Neihu Technology Park	CitiAir Bus	
Joint NTP Commuter Bus 12	Xinzhuang－Neihu Technology Park	San Chung Bus	
Joint NTP Commuter Bus 13	Tianmu－Neihu Technology Park	Metropolitan Transport	
Joint NTP Commuter Bus 15	Tianmu－Neihu Technology Park	Kuang-Hua Bus	
Joint NTP Commuter Bus 16	MRT Shipai Station－Neihu Technology Park	Danan Bus	
Joint NTP Commuter Bus 17	Shilin－Neihu Technology Park	Kuang-Hua Bus	
Joint NTP Commuter Bus 18	MRT 民權西路 Station－Neihu Technology Park	San Chung Bus	
Joint NTP Commuter Bus 19	MRT Taipei City Hall Station－Neihu Technology Park	San Chung Bus	
Joint NTP Commuter Bus 20	MRT Taipei City Hall Station－Neihu Technology Park	Danan Bus	
Joint NTP Commuter Bus 23	Neihu Station－MRT 西hu Station	Metropolitan Transport	

=== Nangang Software Park ===
Route No.	Operating Route	Operator	Remark
Joint 南軟通勤專車Beitou線	Xinbeitou－Nangang Software Park	Danan Bus	
Joint 南軟通勤專車Kunyang線	MRT Kunyang Station－Nangang Software Park	New Taipei Bus	
Joint 南軟通勤專車雙和線	駕訓中心－Nangang Software Park	Metropolitan Transport; Taipei Bus	行經Yonghe Zhongshan路
Joint 南軟通勤專車雙和線 Zhongxing Bus	Zhonghe－Nangang Software Park	Zhongxing Bus	行經MRT 永安市場 Station
Joint 南軟通勤專車Tianmu線	Tianmu－Nangang Software Park	Kuang-Hua Bus	

== Free bus routes ==
=== NTPC City New Bus ===
zh:新北市新巴士, Xin Bei Shi Xin Ba Shi

Route Number	Operating Route	Operator	Remark
NTPC F101	Pingding－Shuxing	Wenjin Tongyun(Tamsui District Office招標)	Previously Tamsui District Free Community Bus 1號線
NTPC F102	Zhongliao－Shuxing	Wenjin Tongyun(Tamsui District Office招標)	Previously Tamsui District Free Community Bus 藍2號線
NTPC F103	Zhongliao－Zhongshan	Wenjin Tongyun(Tamsui District Office招標)	Previously Tamsui District Free Community Bus 紅2號線
NTPC F105	興仁－Zhongshan	Wenjin Tongyun(Tamsui District Office招標)	Previously Tamsui District Free Community Bus 3號線
NTPC F106	興仁－屯山(海線)	Wenjin Tongyun(Tamsui District Office招標)	Previously Tamsui District Free Community Bus 9號線
NTPC F107	Zhuwei－竿蓁	Wenjin Tongyun(Tamsui District Office招標)	經福德, Previously Tamsui District Free Community Bus 紅5號線
NTPC F108	Zhuwei－竿蓁	Wenjin Tongyun(Tamsui District Office招標)	Previously Tamsui District Free Community Bus 藍5號線
NTPC F109	北投－埤島	Wenjin Tongyun(Tamsui District Office招標)	Previously Tamsui District Free Community Bus 6號線
NTPC F110	短程區間車	Wenjin Tongyun(Tamsui District Office招標)	Previously Tamsui District Free Community Bus 10號線
NTPC F111	崁頂－新興	Wenjin Tongyun(Tamsui District Office招標)	Previously Tamsui District Free Community Bus 7號線
NTPC F112	沙崙－油車	Wenjin Tongyun(Tamsui District Office招標)	Previously Tamsui District Free Community Bus 8號線
NTPC F121	Bali Elementary School－樂山療養院、Bali Elementary School－廖添丁廟	小馬通運(Bali District Office招標)	Previously BaliDistrict Free Community Bus 下罟長坑線
NTPC F122	Bali Elementary School循環線	小馬通運(Bali District Office招標)	Previously BaliDistrict Free Community Bus 荖阡坑線
NTPC F123	政霸實業－Bali療養院	小馬通運(Bali District Office招標)	Previously BaliDistrict Free Community Bus 大堀湖－米倉線
NTPC F125	廖添丁廟－馬偕 Hospital	小馬通運(Bali District Office招標)	Previously BaliDistrict Free Community Bus Bali－馬偕 Hospital線
NTPC F126	廖添丁廟－Linkou長庚 Hospital	小馬通運(Bali District Office招標)	Previously BaliDistrict Free Community Bus Bali－Linkou長庚 Hospital線
NTPC F131	Sanzhi國中－錫板智成堂	明揚通運(Sanzhi District Office招標)	
NTPC F132	二號倉庫－二Pingding	明揚通運(Sanzhi District Office招標)	
NTPC F133	二號倉庫－Sanzhi國中	明揚通運(Sanzhi District Office招標)	
NTPC F135	Sanzhi國中－Zhuwei馬偕 Hospital		Previously Sanzhi District Office馬偕醫療專車
NTPC F136	Sanzhi國中－Sanzhi熱帶嶼	明揚通運(Sanzhi District Office招標)	
NTPC F137	Sanzhi國中－士林新光 Hospital	明揚通運(Sanzhi District Office招標)	經馬偕 Hospital、關渡 Hospital、Taipei V.G.H.、振興 Hospital、士林新光 Hospital
NTPC F137紅樹林	Sanzhi國中－MRT 紅樹林站	明揚通運(Sanzhi District Office招標)	
NTPC F138（新古庄）	新庄仔路口－二號倉庫	明揚通運(Sanzhi District Office招標)	Previously Sanzhi District Office新古庄線專車
NTPC F138（內橫山）	芝柏山莊－內橫山	明揚通運(Sanzhi District Office招標)	Previously Sanzhi District Office內橫山線專車
NTPC F201	Xinzhuang District Office－Xinzhuang 福德宮	Sanchong Bus	Xinzhuang District Free Community Bus, 經MRT 輔大站, 去程不經MRT Xinzhuang 站, 回程經MRT Xinzhuang 站, Previously Free接駁專車福營Xinzhuang 線
NTPC F202	文藝中心－Xinzhuang 高中	大洋通運(Xinzhuang District Office招標)	Xinzhuang District Free Community Bus, Previously Free接駁專車中港頭前線
NTPC F203	雙鳳路福德宮－台北 Hospital	新北市Xinzhuang District Office自行營運	Xinzhuang District Free Community Bus, Previously Free醫療專車台北 Hospital福營Xinzhuang 線
NTPC F205	福興里－Linkou長庚 Hospital		Xinzhuang District Free Community Bus, Previously Free醫療專車Linkou長庚 Hospital中港頭前線
NTPC F206	新泰活動中心－Linkou長庚 Hospital		Xinzhuang District Free Community Bus, 往程, Previously Free醫療專車Linkou長庚 HospitalXinzhuang 線
NTPC F207	福營行政中心－Linkou長庚 Hospital		Xinzhuang District Free Community Bus, 往程, Previously Free醫療專車Linkou長庚 Hospital福營線
NTPC F208	MRT Xinzhuang 站－行政院Xinzhuang 聯合辦公大樓	Sanchong Bus	Xinzhuang District Free Community Bus, 2014年 02月05日 通車。
NTPC F208中港	MRT Xinzhuang 站－中港大排願景館	Sanchong Bus	Xinzhuang District Free Community Bus, 2014年 02月05日 通車。
Free醫療專車Linkou長庚 HospitalXinzhuang 福營線	Linkou長庚 Hospital－福營行政中心－新泰活動中心		Xinzhuang District Free Community Bus, 返程, 編號遺漏
NTPC F211	Taishan Public Market－貴和 Community	大西洋通運(Taishan District Office招標)	Previously Taishan 區內Free接駁公車明志線
NTPC F212	Taishan Public Market－山腳溪橋－信義街口	大西洋通運(Taishan District Office招標)	部分班次延駛楓江路, Previously Taishan 區內Free接駁公車泰林線
NTPC F212副	Taishan Public Market－貿商國宅	大西洋通運(Taishan District Office招標)	
NTPC F213	Taishan Public Market－山腳溪橋－勝隆土雞城	三菱通運(Taishan District Office招標)	部分班次經黎明技術學院, Previously Taishan 區內Free接駁公車大科線
NTPC F215	Taishan Public Market－Taipei Main Station(北三門、218公車站牌左側)	Sanchong Bus (Taishan District Office招標)	Previously Taishan －台北Free接駁公車 Public Market線
NTPC F216	明志 Elementary School－Taipei Main Station(北三門、218公車站牌左側)	Sanchong Bus (Taishan District Office招標)	Previously 明志線
NTPC F217	貴和兒童公園－Linkou長庚 Hospital	(Taishan District Office自行營運)	Previously Taishan －Linkou長庚 HospitalFree醫療接駁車
NTPC F218	貴和兒童公園－署立Taipei Hospital	(Taishan District Office自行營運)	Previously Taishan －部立Taipei HospitalFree醫療接駁車
NTPC F221	德泰里(大窠橋)－馬偕 Hospital	Sanchong Bus (Wugu District Office招標)	Previously Wugu District OfficeFree區間(通勤、醫療)Bus Zhuwei線
NTPC F222	陸光總站－御史路	Sanchong Bus (Wugu District Office招標)	Previously Wugu District OfficeFree區間(通勤、醫療)Bus Luzhou線
NTPC F223	立體停車場－Taipei Main Station(北三門、218公車站牌左側)	Sanchong Bus (Wugu District Office招標)	Previously Wugu District OfficeFreeMRT 接駁Bus
NTPC F223(經工業區)	立體停車場－Taipei Main Station(北三門、218公車站牌左側)	Sanchong Bus (Wugu District Office招標)	Previously Wugu District OfficeFreeMRT 接駁Bus, 行經新北產業園區
NTPC F225	Wugu－Taipei V.G.H.	Sanchong Bus (Wugu District Office招標)	Wugu District OfficeFree區間(通勤、醫療)Bus, 2014年9月19日通車
NTPC F231	Linkou Gas Station－寶林路－長庚 Hospital	日華通運(Linkou District Office招標)	Previously LinkouDistrict Free Community Bus 1號線
NTPC F232	Linkou Gas Station－國際新星 Community －長庚 Hospital	日華通運(Linkou District Office招標)	Previously LinkouDistrict Free Community Bus 2號線
NTPC F233	水尾站－Linkou Gas Station－長庚 Hospital	日華通運(Linkou District Office招標)	經醒吾技術學院, Previously LinkouDistrict Free Community Bus 3號線
NTPC F235	瑞平 Elementary School－Linkou Gas Station－長庚 Hospital	日華通運(Linkou District Office招標)	Previously LinkouDistrict Free Community Bus 5號線
NTPC F236	洪厝－Linkou Gas Station	日華通運(Linkou District Office招標)	Previously LinkouDistrict Free Community Bus 6號線
NTPC F237	出水坑－Linkou Gas Station	日華通運(Linkou District Office招標)	Previously LinkouDistrict Free Community Bus 7號線
NTPC F237副	未來城 Community -麗園 Elementary School	日華通運(Linkou District Office招標)	
NTPC F238	Linkou發電廠－Linkou Gas Station	日華通運(Linkou District Office招標)	經南屏橋, Previously LinkouDistrict Free Community Bus 8號線
NTPC F239	Linkou發電廠－Linkou Gas Station	日華通運(Linkou District Office招標)	經珍珠嶺, Previously LinkouDistrict Free Community Bus 9號線
NTPC F250	太平 Community －菁埔－長庚 Hospital	日華通運(Linkou District Office招標)	Previously LinkouDistrict Free Community Bus 12號線
NTPC F301	Sanchong District Office－二重 Elementary School－Sanchong Hospital－Sanchong District Office		Previously SanchongDistrict Free Community Bus 二重線
NTPC F302	Sanchong District Office－龍門路底		Previously SanchongDistrict Free Community Bus 龍濱線
NTPC F303	Sanchong District Office－永福街		Previously SanchongDistrict Free Community Bus 永福線
NTPC F311	Luzhou District Office－Luzhou復興路117巷口	新北市Luzhou District Office自行營運	Previously LuzhouDistrict Free Community Bus 長安線
NTPC F312	Luzhou District Office－Luzhou復興路17巷口	新北市Luzhou District Office自行營運	Previously LuzhouDistrict Free Community Bus 水湳線
NTPC F313	Luzhou派出所－中山路一段166號	新北市Luzhou District Office自行營運	Previously LuzhouDistrict Free Community Bus 民和線
NTPC F315	Luzhou District Office－Luzhou復興路17巷口	新北市Luzhou District Office自行營運	Previously LuzhouDistrict Free Community Bus 永安線
NTPC F316	Luzhou District Office－Luzhou復興路17巷口	新北市Luzhou District Office自行營運	Previously LuzhouDistrict Free Community Bus Luzhou線
NTPC F317	Luzhou District Office－Luzhou復興路117巷口	新北市Luzhou District Office自行營運	Previously LuzhouDistrict Free Community Bus 長安線
NTPC F318	MRT Luzhou Station－Bali渡船頭	新北市Luzhou District Office自行營運	Previously LuzhouDistrict Free Community Bus Bali線
NTPC F501	樹林－MRT Banqiao Station	Taipei Bus	Previously 840,並增加樹林 Railway Station(單側),樹林 District Office(單側),板林溪北路口三站
NTPC F502	歡仔園－MRT Banqiao Station	Taipei Bus	Previously 841
NTPC F511	自強國中－MRT 府中站	Taipei Bus	中和District FreeBus
NTPC F512	橫路里－自強國中	新北市中和 District Office自行營運	中和District FreeBus
NTPC F513	灰瑤－秀山地區	新北市中和 District Office自行營運	中和District FreeBus
NTPC F521	仁愛公園－MRT 頂溪站(循環線)	萬泰通運(永和 District Office招標)	經MRT 頂溪站, Previously 永和District FreeBus A線
NTPC F522	MRT 頂溪站－環河東路(循環線)	日華通運(永和 District Office招標)	Previously 永和District FreeBus B線
NTPC F523	永平 Elementary School－保順保生路口	大洋通運(永和 District Office招標)	經MRT 永安 Market站, Previously 永和District FreeBus C線
NTPC F525	新北市立圖書館 永和民權分館－MRT 永安 Market站(循環線)	世界聯合通運(永和 District Office招標)	經MRT 永安 Market站, Previously 永和District FreeBus D線
NTPC F526	民本里－MRT 永安 Market站(循環線)	乙泰通運(永和 District Office招標)	經MRT 永安 Market站, Previously 永和District FreeBus E線
NTPC F601	南天母－德霖學院－山中湖	Taipei Bus (土城 District Office招標)	經明德路一段、清水路、新北高工、土城 District Office, Previously 土城區假日Free休閒公車山中湖線
NTPC F602	南天母－MRT 永寧站－善息寺	Taipei Bus (土城 District Office招標)	經土城國中, Previously 土城區假日Free休閒公車頂埔線
NTPC F603	南天母－延和廣場	Taipei Bus (土城 District Office招標)	經 臺灣新北地方法院、看守所、新北高工、土城 District Office, Previously 土城區假日Free休閒公車清水線
NTPC F605	南天母－MRT 永寧站－信義 Elementary School	Taipei Bus (土城 District Office招標)	經MRT 海山站、裕民路、新北高工, Previously 土城區假日Free休閒公車土城線A車, 低地板公車
NTPC F606	南天母－MRT 永寧站－信義 Elementary School	Taipei Bus (土城 District Office招標)	經中華路、不經新北高工, Previously 土城區假日Free休閒公車土城線B車, 低地板公車
NTPC F607	南天母－MRT 永寧站2號出口	Taipei Bus (土城 District Office招標)	往永寧站方向行經大墓公, Previously 土城區假日Free休閒公車永寧線, 低地板公車
NTPC F611	大學風呂－長庚 Hospital桃園分院		經Linkou長庚 Hospital, 區間車僅行駛樹林 District Office至長庚 Hospital桃園分院, Previously 樹林District Free Community Bus 長庚 Hospital線
NTPC F621	長福停車場－長福停車場		循環線、經恩主公 Hospital, Previously 三峽District Free Community Bus 市區1線
NTPC F622	長福停車場－長福停車場		循環線, 經恩主公 Hospital、台北大學, Previously 三峽District Free Community Bus 市區2線
NTPC F623	文化停車場－福慶宮		經真善美 Community, Previously 三峽District Free Community Bus 弘道線
NTPC F625	大仁路‧大勇路口－明德中學		Previously 三峽District Free Community Bus 二鬮線
NTPC F626	文化停車場－湊合橋	大洋通運(三峽 District Office招標)	Previously 三峽District Free Community Bus 紫微線
NTPC F627	大仁路‧大勇路口－五寮		Previously 三峽District Free Community Bus 五寮線
NTPC F628	文化停車場－白雞行修宮	佳欣遊覽車客運(三峽 District Office招標)	經辭修高中、成福, Previously 三峽District Free Community Bus 湊合線
NTPC F629	文化停車場－挖子		經恩主公 Hospital、成福、九鬮, Previously 三峽District Free Community Bus 竹崙安坑線
NTPC F630	大仁路‧大勇路口－五寮		經恩主公 Hospital, Previously 三峽District Free Community Bus 長庚 Hospital線
NTPC F631	長福停車場－Yingge Railway Station		經恩主公 Hospital、客家文化園區, Previously 三峽District Free Community Bus Yingge車站線
NTPC F651	Yingge Railway Station－ Gas Station	日華通運(Yingge District Office招標)	Previously YinggeDistrict Free Community Bus 二橋建德線
NTPC F652	Yingge District Office－恩主公 Hospital－MRT 永寧站	日華通運(Yingge District Office招標)	Previously YinggeDistrict Free Community Bus 恩主公醫療線
NTPC F653	A車：Yingge Railway Station－國際新城－惠隆宮－Yingge Railway Station; B車：Yingge Railway Station－惠隆宮－國際新城－Yingge Railway Station	日華通運(Yingge District Office招標)	Previously YinggeDistrict Free Community Bus 國際新城線
NTPC F655	Yingge District Office－長庚 Hospital	日華通運(Yingge District Office招標)	Previously YinggeDistrict Free Community Bus 長庚醫療線
NTPC F656	鳳吉理想 Community －Yingge Railway Station	日華通運(Yingge District Office招標)	Previously YinggeDistrict Free Community Bus 鳳吉理想線
NTPC F701	MRT Xindian District Office站－新家坡	Xindian客運(Xindian District Office招標)	行經安一路, Previously Xindian區民Free接駁公車安康線
NTPC F702	MRT Xindian District Office站－新和 Elementary School	大洋通運(Xindian District Office招標)	行經安和路, Previously Xindian區民Free接駁公車安和線
NTPC F703	頂城 Community －安泰橋		行經安康路, Previously Xindian區民Free接駁公車安康山區線
NTPC F705	MRT 七張站－寶興路60巷口		行經寶高路、寶興路, Previously Xindian區民Free接駁公車寶福七張線
NTPC F706	Xindian District Office－寶興路60巷口		Previously Xindian區民Free接駁公車寶福惠國 Market線
NTPC F707	Xindian District Office－獅仔頭山		Previously XindianDistrict Free觀光Bus 獅仔頭山線
NTPC F708	Xindian District Office－大桶山	利達通運(Xindian District Office招標)	Previously XindianDistrict Free觀光Bus 新烏Route
XindianDistrict Free觀光Bus 環潭線	Xindian District Office－小粗坑發電廠		限當地里民搭乘
Xindian水源區交通車龜山線	大桶山－Xindian District Office		使用水源回饋金營運,限當地里民搭乘.行經龜山活動中心
Xindian水源區交通車塗潭里線	紅瓦屋－永業路口		使用水源回饋金營運,限當地里民搭乘.
Xindian水源區交通車直潭里線	MRT Xindian站－下石厝路		使用水源回饋金營運,限當地里民搭乘
Xindian水源區交通車廣興線	MRT Xindian站－廣興分校		行經翡翠水庫, 限當地里民搭乘
NTPC F711	Shenkeng Elementary School－土庫尖－昇高橋－Shenkeng Elementary School	新北市Shenkeng District Office自行營運	Previously ShenkengDistrict Free Community Bus 土庫尖線
NTPC F712	Shenkeng Elementary School／Shenkeng District Office－中正橋－大崙尾	新北市Shenkeng District Office自行營運	Previously ShenkengDistrict Free Community Bus 大崙尾線
NTPC F713	Shenkeng Elementary School－大坑－Shenkeng District Office	新北市Shenkeng District Office自行營運	Previously ShenkengDistrict Free Community Bus 大坑線
石碇永安線1	石碇 District Office－永安 Elementary School		限當地里民搭乘
石碇永安線2	石碇 District Office－柑腳		限當地里民搭乘
石碇姑娘廟線	石碇 District Office－姑娘廟		限當地里民搭乘
石碇格頭線1	碧山派出所－石碇 District Office／雲海 Elementary School		限當地里民搭乘
石碇格頭線2	石碇 District Office－雲海 Elementary School		限當地里民搭乘
石碇新興坑線	石碇 District Office－新興坑		限當地里民搭乘
石碇潭邊光明線	石碇 District Office－小粗坑		限當地里民搭乘
石碇豐田彭山線	石碇 District Office－豐田派出所／彭山活動中心		限當地里民搭乘
NTPC F721	坪林－南山寺	大洋通運(坪林 District Office招標)	Previously 坪林District Free接駁車－南山寺線
NTPC F722	坪林－九芎根親水公園	大洋通運(坪林 District Office招標)	Previously 坪林District Free接駁車－金瓜寮線
NTPC F723	坪林－大林		
烏來線	烏來 District Office－孝義／忠治／福山		限當地里民搭
NTPC F801	Ruifang－四腳亭		
NTPC F802	Ruifang－金瓜石		
NTPC F803	Ruifang－四腳亭		經八分寮
NTPC F805	Ruifang－和美 Elementary School		
NTPC F806	Ruifang－大福煤礦		
NTPC F807	Ruifang區內巡迴線		
NTPC F808	Ruifang－三貂嶺		
NTPC F811	澳底－Shuangxi－八股－灣潭	大千交通	
NTPC F812	Mudan－Shuangxi－柑腳	大千交通	
NTPC F821	Pingxi－新寮大厝		
NTPC F822	Pingxi－東勢派出所		
NTPC F823	Pingxi－福隆	大千交通	
NTPC F835	貢寮 District Office－澳底		
NTPC F836	澳底－福連		
NTPC F837	貢寮 District Office－龍洞		
NTPC F838	貢寮 District Office－美豐		
NTPC F901	Xizhi Railway Station－汐碇石頭公	萬泰通運(Xizhi District Office招標)	Previously Xizhi District Free Community Bus 橫科線
NTPC F902	Xizhi Railway Station－逸林園	大洋通運(Xizhi District Office招標)	Previously Xizhi District Free Community Bus 水源線
NTPC F903	Xizhi Railway Station－天道清修院	萬泰通運(Xizhi District Office招標)	逢星期三及例假日經石汐、光明路, Previously Xizhi District Free Community Bus 汐碇線
NTPC F905	Xizhi Railway Station－仁愛橋(－Pingxi)	萬泰通運(Xizhi District Office招標)	部分班次延駛至Pingxi, Previously Xizhi District Free Community Bus 汐平線
NTPC F906	Xizhi Railway Station－保長里	萬泰通運(Xizhi District Office招標)	Previously Xizhi District Free Community Bus 五堵線
NTPC F907	A車：秀峰高中－Xizhi Railway Station－中興Bus 總站－秀峰高中; B車：秀峰高中－中興Bus 總站－Xizhi Railway Station－秀峰高中	萬泰通運(Xizhi District Office招標)	A車部分班次經埤內; B車全部班次不經埤內; Previously Xizhi District Free Community Bus 鄉長線
NTPC F908	Xizhi Railway Station－瑞士山莊	萬泰通運(Xizhi District Office招標)	部分班次經石頭厝, Previously Xizhi District Free Community Bus 烘內線
NTPC F909	Xizhi Railway Station－Bali溪谷公園(－五指山森林公園)	萬泰通運	部分班次延駛五指山森林公園, Previously Xizhi District Free Community Bus 八連線
NTPC F910	Xizhi Railway Station－翠柏新村	萬泰通運	Previously Xizhi District Free Community Bus 五指山線
NTPC F911	Xizhi Railway Station－五谷金聖殿(－天秀宮)	萬泰通運	部分班次延駛天秀宮, Previously Xizhi District Free Community Bus 大尖山線
NTPC F912	A車：Xizhi 公園－Xizhi Railway Station; B車：Xizhi Railway Station－Xizhi 公園	大洋通運(Xizhi District Office招標)	A車全部班次不延駛光復街; B車部分班次延駛光復街; Previously Xizhi District Free Community Bus 大同新五線
NTPC F913	崇義高中－木南煤礦(－瓏山林 Community )	萬泰通運(Xizhi District Office招標)	部分班次延駛至瓏山林 Community, Previously Xizhi District Free Community Bus 社后線
NTPC F915	Xizhi 公園－金龍 Elementary School	萬泰通運(Xizhi District Office招標)	Previously Xizhi District Free Community Bus 中興線
NTPC F916	樟樹國中－樟樹 Elementary School	萬泰通運(Xizhi District Office招標)	Previously Xizhi District Free Community Bus 社后樟樹區間線
NTPC F917	歡天館－金龍 Elementary School－金龍活動中心	萬泰通運(Xizhi District Office招標)	部分班次於金龍 Elementary School後回程, 不經日月光 Community 及水蓮山莊, Previously Xizhi District Free Community Bus 社后汐湖區間線
NTPC F918	水蓮山莊－木南煤礦－水蓮山莊	萬泰通運(Xizhi District Office招標)	Previously Xizhi District Free Community Bus 湖蓮線
NTPC F919	水晶山莊－金龍 Elementary School	甲天下通運(Xizhi District Office招標)	
NTPC F920	Xizhi －Pingxi	萬泰通運(Xizhi District Office招標)	
NTPC F921	Wanli District Office－金山中山堂－金山 Hospital	Keelung Bus	部份班次經大坪 Elementary School至中山堂, 部份班次至金山 Hospital, 假日經獅頭山遊客中心、金山老街, Previously WanliDistrict Free Community Bus －山海線
NTPC F922	Wanli District Office－溪底		部份班次經烏塗炭, 部份班次經內崁, Previously WanliDistrict Free Community Bus －山線
NTPC F923	Wanli District Office－野柳－金山 Hospital	Keelung Bus	部份班次經仁愛之家至金山 Hospital, 部份班次至魚澳, 部份班次至金山 Hospital, 假日經獅頭山遊客中心、金山老街, Previously WanliDistrict Free Community Bus －海線
NTPC F933	金山 District Office－金青中心		Previously 金山District Free Community Bus
註1：亞盛通運請參見 亞通Bus 集團

=== Convenience routes ===
Route No.	Operating Route	Operator	Remark
Bali療養院Shuttle車	Bali療養院－MRT Guandu Station	unknown	
Tamkang University Shuttle Bus	Tamkang University－MRT Tamsui Station	unknown	
國泰 Hospital Shuttle車	國泰 Hospital －MRT Zhongxiao Fuxing Station	unknown	
康橋國小Shuttle車	康橋國小－MRT Xindian Station	unknown	
Mackay Hospital Shuttle Bus	馬偕 Hospital －MRT Zhuwei Station	unknown	
VG Shuttle車	VG 中正樓－MRT Shipai Station	unknown	
VG Guandu Hospital Shuttle車	Guandu Hospital －MRT Guandu Station	unknown	
三軍總 Hospital Shuttle車	三軍總 Hospital －MRT Kunyang Station、TRA Songshan Station	unknown	
三芝鄉公所Shuttle車	示範公墓－MRT 紅Shulin Station	unknown	
Taipei MRT Free Shuttle Bus	MRT Nangang Station－MRT Nangang展覽館 Station	Kuang-Hua Bus	Only stops at terminus MRT Station(部分配車向同集團業者租用)
NTU Hospital 巡迴醫療專車	NTU Hospital 總院區－NTU Hospital Gongguan院區	NTU Hospital	准行經羅斯福路 公車專用道
陽明 Hospital Shuttle車	陽明 Hospital －MRT 芝山 Station	乙泰通運、北大通運	
振興 Hospital Shuttle車	振興 Hospital －MRT 明德 Station	unknown	
中興 Hospital Shuttle車	中興 Hospital －Taipei Main Station	unknown	
亞東紀念 Hospital Shuttle車	亞東紀念 Hospital －土城市福祥街	unknown	

=== Other routes ===
Route No.	Operating Route	Operator	Remark
長緹海景飯店Shuttle車	長緹海景飯店－MRT Tamsui Station	unknown	
春天酒店Shuttle車	春天酒店－MRT Beitou／Xinbeitou Station	unknown	
大地之子Shuttle車	大地之子－MRT Fuxinggang Station	unknown	
大學詩鄉 Community Shuttle車	大學詩鄉－MRT Xindian Station	unknown	
大葉高島屋Shuttle車(明德 Station)	大葉高島屋－MRT Mingde Station	北大通運	
大葉高島屋Shuttle車(芝山 Station)	大葉高島屋－MRT Zhishan Station	北大通運	
京華城生活巴士(Zhongxiao線)	京華城(市民廣場)－MRT Zhongxiao Fuxing Station	Shin-Shin Bus	
美麗華Shuttle公車	美麗華－MRT Jiantan Station	Danan Bus	
太平洋溫泉會館Shuttle車	太平洋溫泉會館－MRT Beitou/Xinbeitou Station	unknown	
潤福生活新象Shuttle車	潤福生活新象－MRT Tamsui Station	unknown	
拾翠山莊 Community巴士(Tamsui Station)	拾翠山莊－MRT Tamsui Station	unknown	
拾翠山莊 Community巴士(紅Shulin Station)	拾翠山莊－MRT Hongshulin Station	unknown	
Taipei101 Shuttle專車	Taipei101－MRT Taipei City Hall Station	Capital Bus	
Tianmu Baseball場Shuttle專車	MRT 芝山 Station－Tianmu Baseball場	Capital Bus	僅於Tianmu Baseball場進行職棒比賽與部份國際比賽時開行
Xinzhuang Baseball場Shuttle專車	MRT Xinpu Station－Xinzhuang Baseball場	Capital Bus	僅於Xinzhuang Baseball場進行職棒比賽與部份國際比賽時開行
微風廣場Shuttle公車	微風廣場－MRT Zhongxiao Fuxing Station	unknown	
新光三越Tianmu店Shuttle公車	新光三越TaipeiTianmu店－MRT 芝山 Station	Danan Bus	
迪斯尼購物廣場Shuttle公車	--迪斯尼廣場, 非迪士尼廣場, 迪斯尼廣場由寶路集團創建,與迪士尼無任何關係-->－MRT 海山 Station	三洋通運	
Zhonghe環球Shopping mall免費Shuttle公車(景安線)	環球Shopping mall－MRT 景安 Station	裕順通運	
Zhonghe環球Shopping mall免費Shuttle公車(Xinpu線)	環球Shopping mall－MRT Xinpu Station1號出口	裕順通運	
Zhonghe環球Shopping mall免費Shuttle公車(土城線)	環球Shopping mall－MRT 海山 Station－Banqiao愛買吉安－環球Shopping mall	裕順通運	
Zhonghe環球Shopping mall免費Shuttle公車(Banqiao線)	環球Shopping mall－MRT Fuzhong Station－Banqiao Railway Station	裕順通運	

== See also ==
- List of bus routes in Taichung
