= Taipei Zoo (disambiguation) =

Taipei Zoo is a Zoo in Wenshan District, Taipei, Taiwan.

Taipei Zoo may also refer to:

- Taipei Zoo station, a terminus station of Taipei Metro.
- Taipei Zoo South gondola station, a station on the Maokong Gondola.
