= Zhinan Temple gondola station =

Maokong Gondola station in Taipei, Taiwan

Coordinates: 24°58′43″N 121°35′22.4″E

Zhinan Temple 指南宮
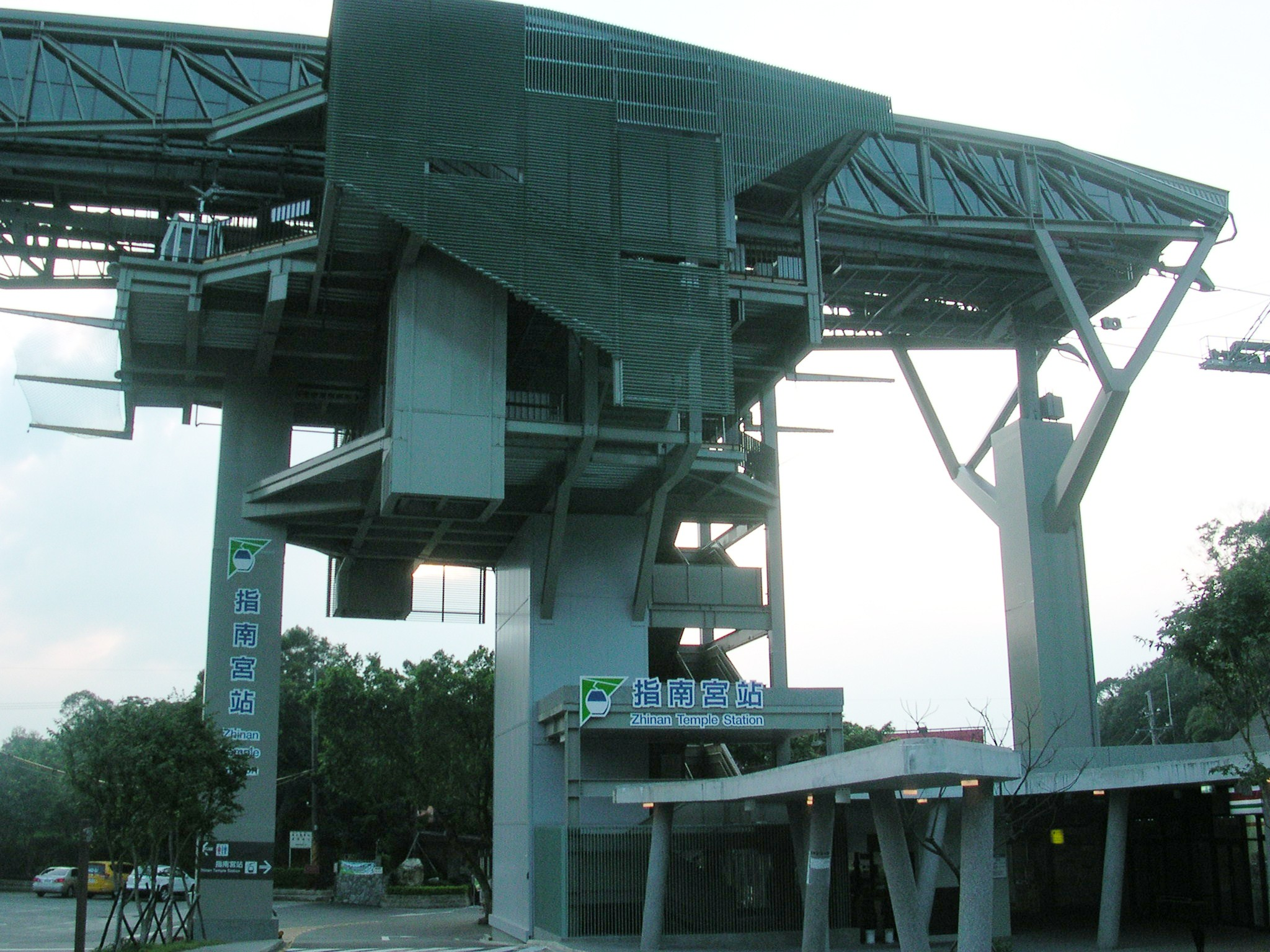

General information
- Location: Wenshan, Taipei; Taiwan
- Operated by: Taipei Metro
- Line: Maokong Gondola

Construction
- Structure type: Elevated

History
- Opened: 4 July 2007

Services
Preceding station	Taipei Metro	Following station
Taipei Zoo South towards Taipei Zoo	Maokong Gondola	Maokong Terminus
Location

Zhinan Temple Station (Chinese: 指南宮站; pinyin: Zhǐnán Gōng Zhàn) is a station on the Maokong Gondola of the Taipei Rapid Transit System, located in Wenshan District, Taipei, Taiwan. It is named for the nearby Zhinan Temple.
