= Taipei Zoo South gondola station =

Taipei Zoo South 動物園南
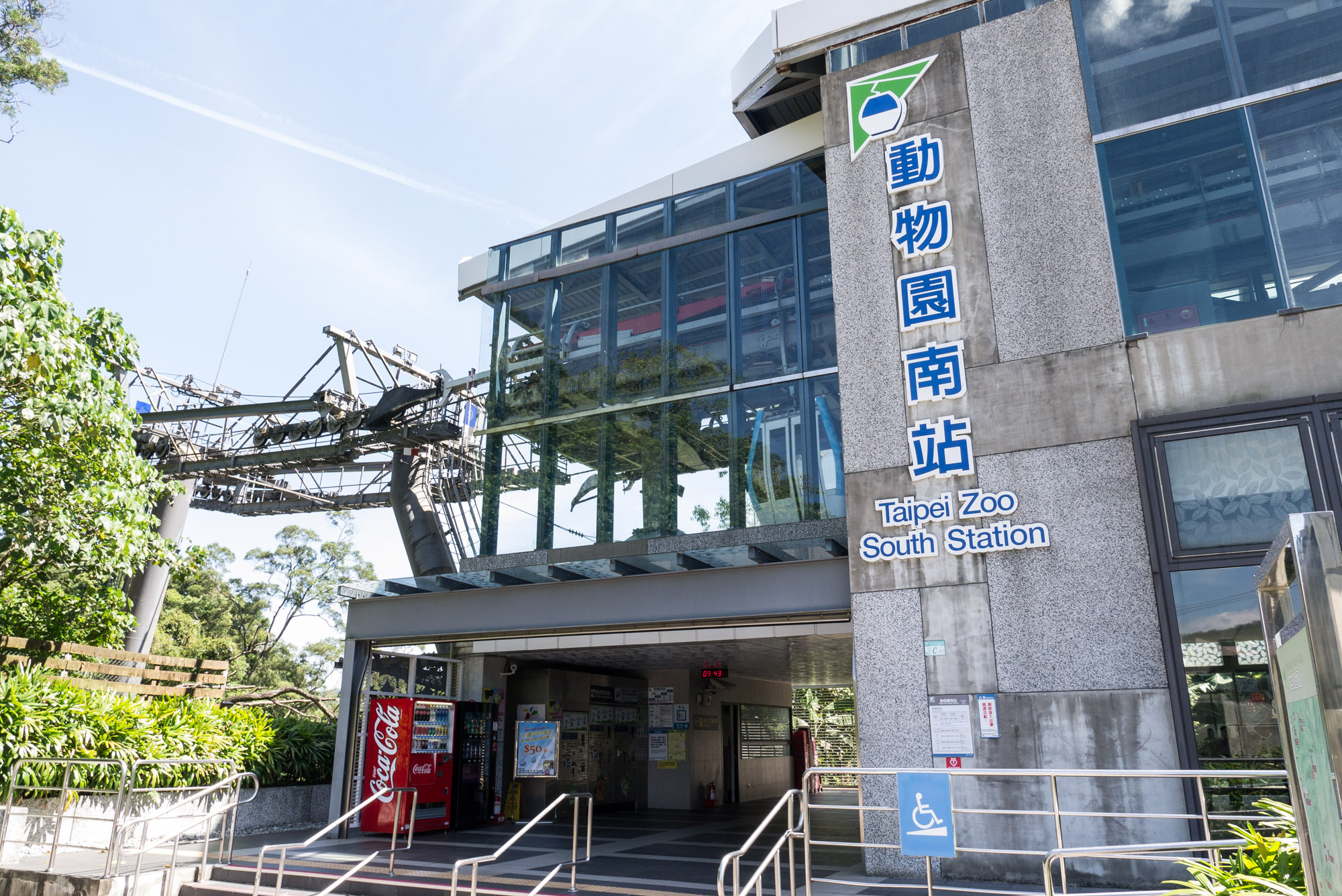

General information
- Location: Wenshan, Taipei; Taiwan
- Operated by: Taipei Rapid Transit System
- Line: Maokong Gondola

Construction
- Structure type: Elevated

History
- Opened: July 4, 2007

Services
Preceding station	Taipei Metro	Following station
Taipei Zoo Terminus	Maokong Gondola	Zhinan Temple towards Maokong
Location

Taipei Zoo South Station (Chinese: 動物園南站) is a station on the Taipei Metro and a cable car station on the Maokong Gondola located in Wenshan District, Taipei, Taiwan. Upon opening, the station was named "Zoo Inner Station," whilst the English name of the station was "Taipei Zoo South Station." The Chinese name was later modified to match its current name.

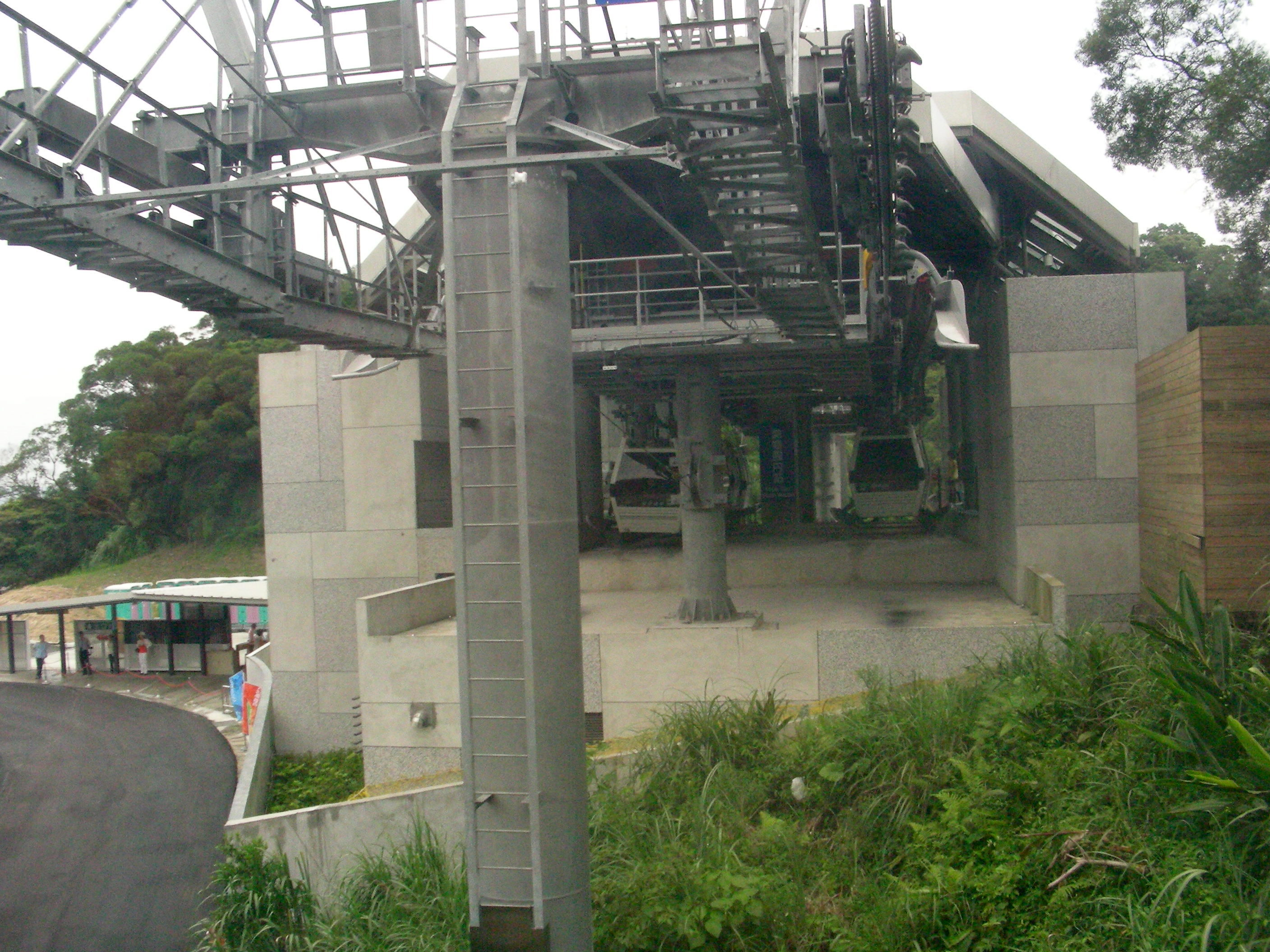
Taipei Zoo South Station

== See also ==
- Taipei Zoo
