= Maokong gondola station =

Gondola station in Taipei, Taiwan

Coordinates: 24°58′7″N 121°35′17.6″E

Maokong 貓空
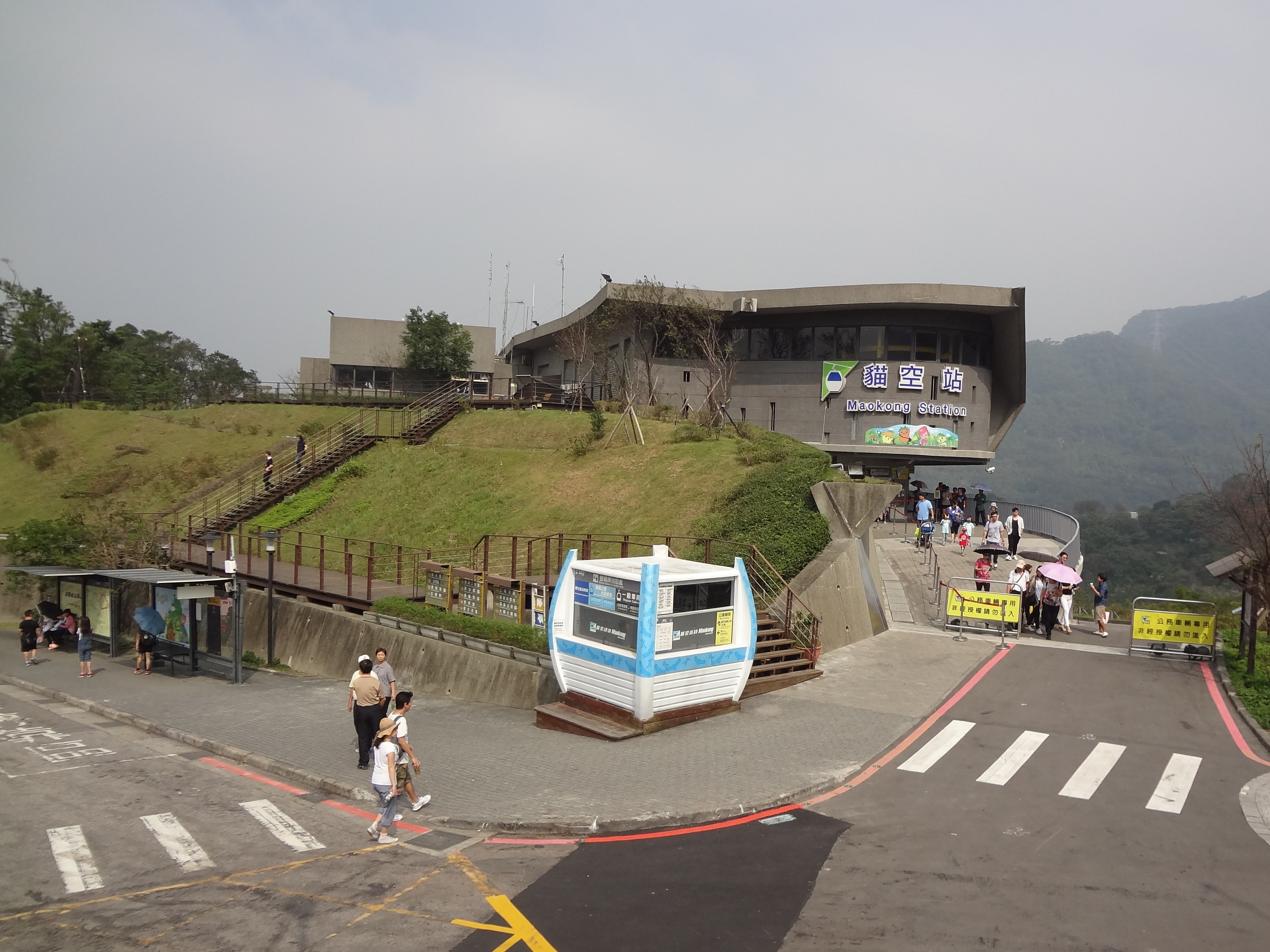

General information
- Location: Wenshan, Taipei; Taiwan
- Operator: Taipei Metro
- Line: Maokong Gondola

Construction
- Structure type: Elevated

History
- Opened: July 4, 2007

Passengers
- 2021: 1,391

Services
Preceding station	Taipei Metro	Following station
Zhinan Temple towards Taipei Zoo	Maokong Gondola	Terminus
Location

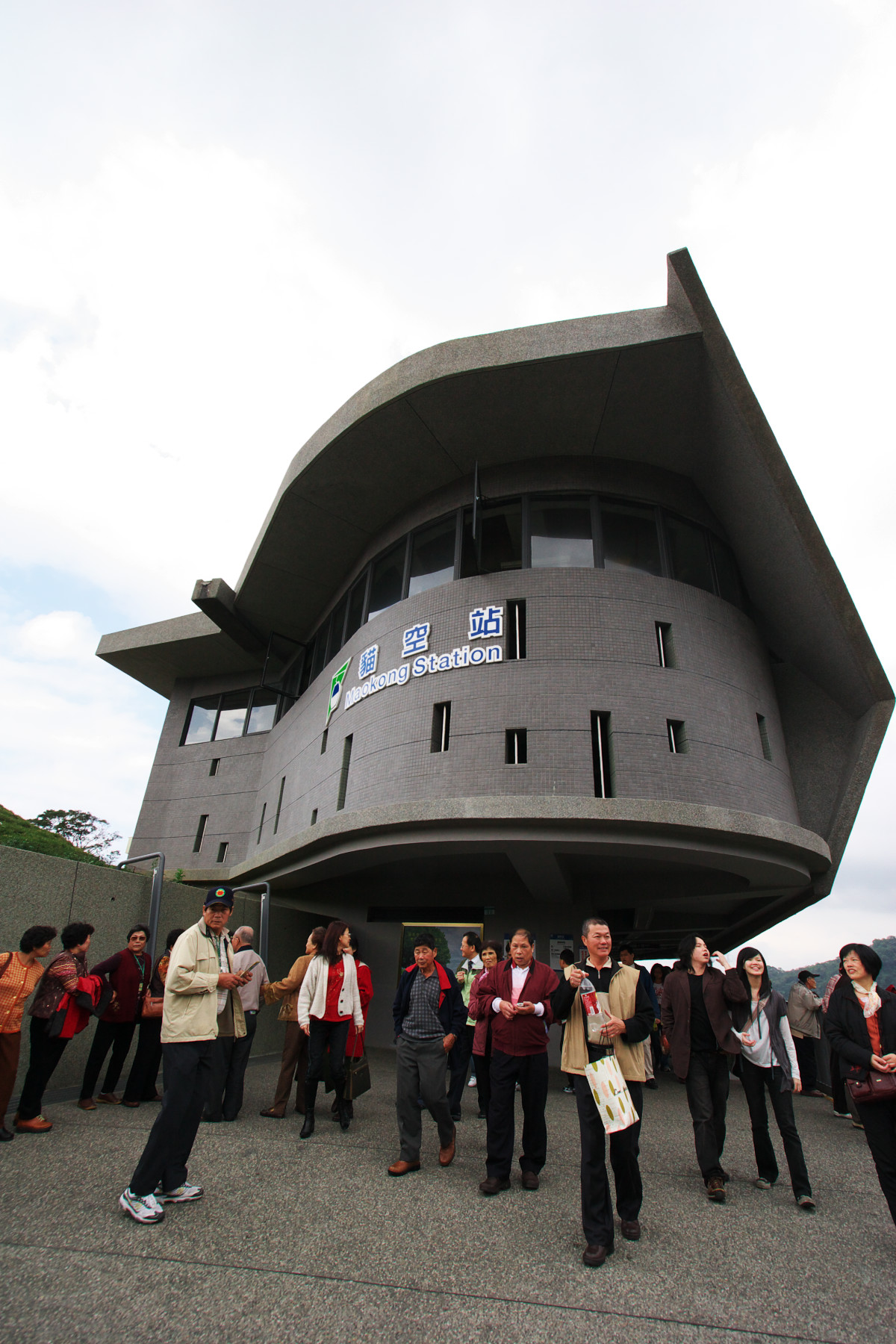
Maokong station

Maokong Station is the terminal station of the Maokong Gondola of the Taipei Rapid Transit System, located in Wenshan District, Taipei, Taiwan. It provides access to the town of Maokong, which the station is named after.

== Station overview ==
The station is elevated and contains a parking space for cable cars.

== Surrounding area ==
- Maokong
- Sanxuan Temple
