= Maokong Gondola =

Gondola lift in Taipei, Taiwan

- 貓空纜車
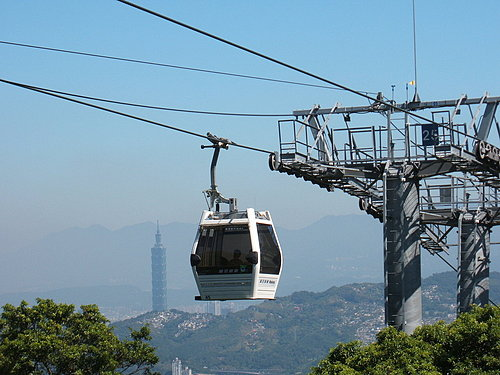

- Interactive map of Maokong Gondola

Overview
- Status: Operational
- Character: Tourism
- Location: Wenshan, Taipei
- Country: Taiwan
- Coordinates: 24°59′45″N 121°34′34″E
- Termini: Taipei Zoo; Maokong
- Elevation: lowest: 24.1 metres (79 ft) highest: 299.3 metres (982 ft)
- Connecting lines: Wenhu line
- No. of stations: 6 (4 passenger stations, 2 angle stations)
- Built by: Poma
- Construction begin: 10 November 2005
- Open: July 4, 2007; 19 years ago
- Closed: 1 October 2008
- Reopened: March 30, 2010; 16 years ago
- Website: gondola.taipei

Operation
- Owner: Taipei City Government
- Operator: Taipei Rapid Transit Corporation
- No. of carriers: 147
- Carrier capacity: 8 passengers (regular cabin); 5 passengers (crystal cabin)
- Trip duration: 12 minutes
- Fare: NT$180

Technical features
- Aerial lift type: Mono-cable gondola detachable
- Line length: 4.03 kilometres (2.50 mi)
- No. of support towers: 47
- Operating speed: 6 metres per second (20 ft/s)

The Maokong Gondola (traditional Chinese: 貓空纜車; simplified Chinese: 猫空缆车; pinyin: Māokōng Lǎnchē) is a gondola lift transportation system in Taipei, Taiwan. It is operated by the Taipei Rapid Transit Corporation and integrated with its fare system. Opened on 4 July 2007, the Maokong Gondola operates between Taipei Zoo and Maokong over a distance of 4.03 km (2.50 mi) with four stations and two angle stations. The gondola was constructed by the French company Poma.

== History ==
On the first day of operation, a faulty door lock left Mayor Hau Lung-pin and former Mayor Ma Ying-jeou suspended for 10 minutes in mid-air. Later, bad weather also caused operations to shut down a few times. Violent thunderstorms returned the next day and operation was suspended for a few hours.

Local environmental protection groups such as Green Party Taiwan and Homemaker's Union have discouraged people from using the gondola lift. Local residents have complained about excessive noise during operation, increased garbage and the danger of mudslides. Tests conducted by the Environmental Protection Administration and the TCG Department of Environmental Protection showed that noise levels are within regulations. To mitigate environmental damage, construction pillars and excavation were minimized.

At 4:50 p.m. on 21 July 2007, the service on the gondola system was suspended for approximately 2 hours due to a mechanical glitch, trapping 323 people on the cable cars. The evacuation took place from 5:50 p.m. through 6:55 p.m. TRTS personnel reimbursed passengers by giving them NT$1,058 and free tickets worth NT$100 each. The system resumed normal operations at noon the following day.

On 24 July 2007, the service on the gondola system was suspended twice. Service was suspended at noon for around two hours due to a thunderstorm, and again at 3:10 p.m. due to mechanical problems. No passengers were trapped on the gondola cars. Consumers' Foundation, Taiwan recommended that the Maokong Gondola should shut down completely, and only re-open after evaluating and repairing all systems.

On 2 October 2008 the Maokong Gondola was closed pending structural repair after mudslides left a 2.5 meter gap beneath a support pillar.

Rains associated with Typhoon Jangmi caused erosion around a pillar on the Corner 2 Station. As a result, on 1 October 2008 operations of the Gondola were suspended for one month to allow a full safety inspection to be carried out.

On December 1, investigators recommended the relocation of pillar T16, the foundation of which had been eroded by the rainfall of four typhoons and was very unlikely to withstand future earthquakes. Relocating T16 and neighboring pillars took two years. The gondola officially resumed service as of 31 March 2010, after relocation of the pillar and passing safety inspections.

These and other problems have contributed to the system's consistent financial losses.

== Stations ==
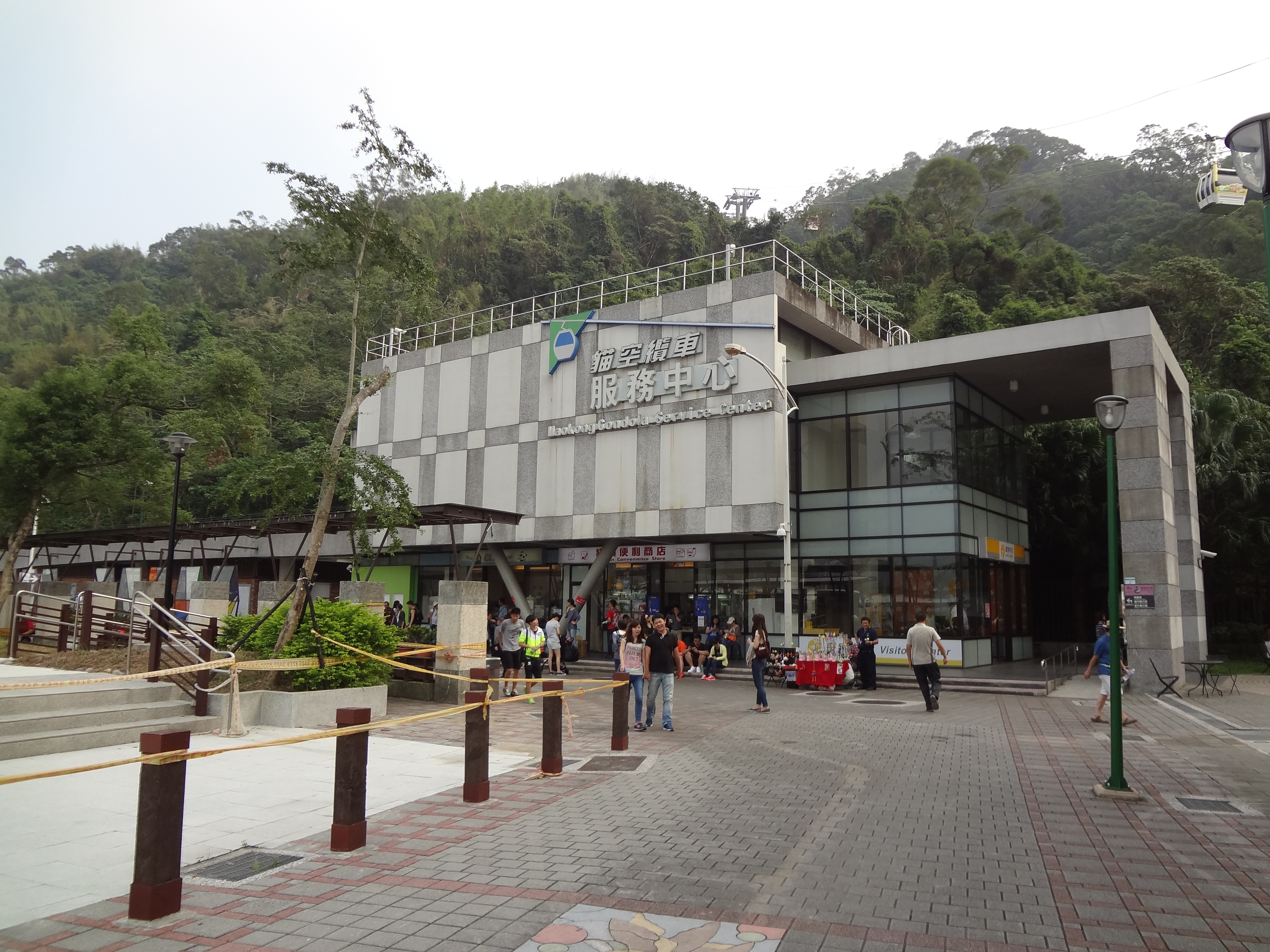
Maokong Gondola Service Center

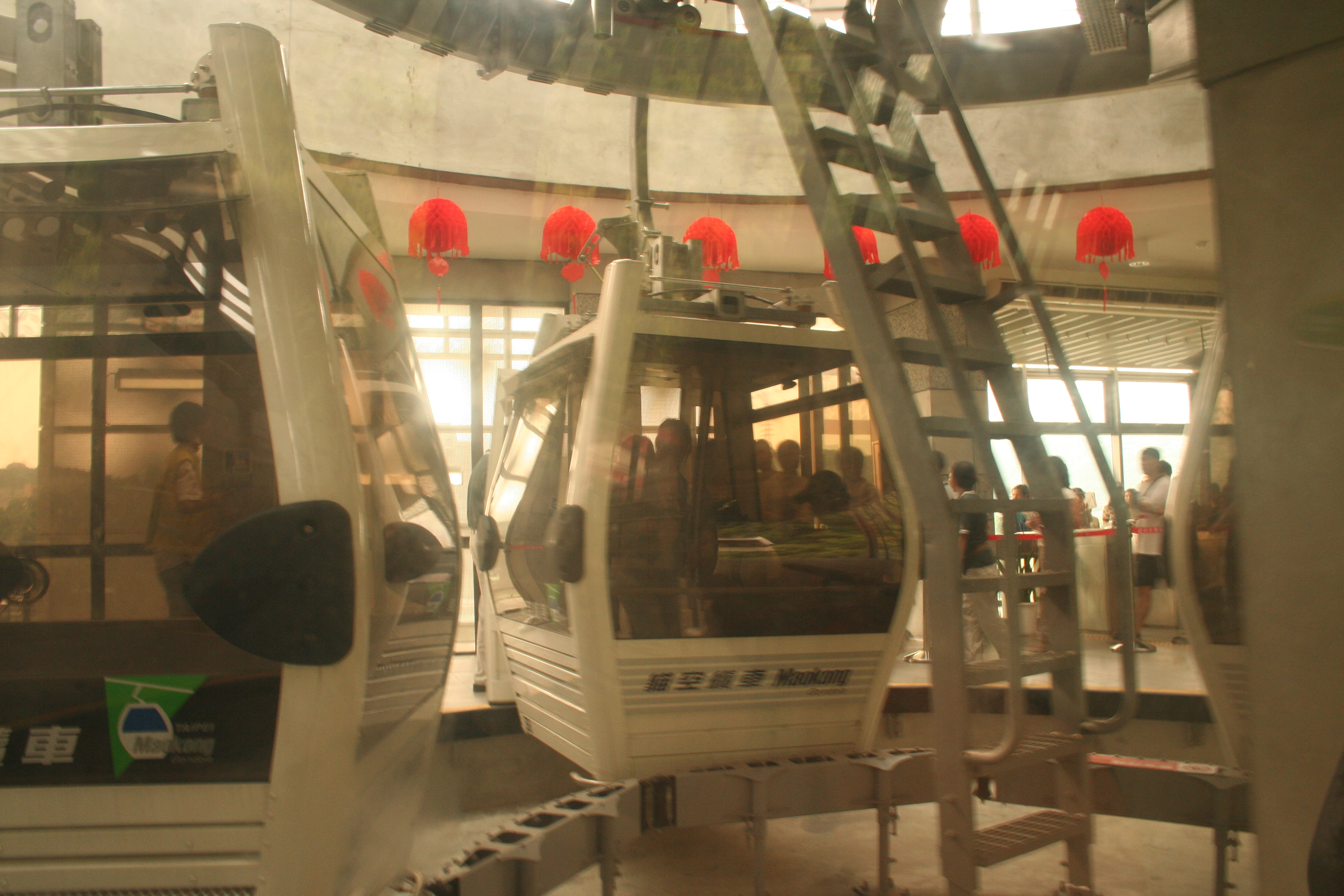
The boarding area at Taipei Zoo station

The system has four stations for a total trip time of 12 minutes.

Code	Station name	Platform	Elevation (m)	Locale		Sta. distance (km)		Opened date	Transfer
Code	Station name	Platform	Elevation (m)	Locale		Previous	Total	Opened date	Transfer
Maokong Gondola
1	Taipei Zoo 動物園	Rotary	24.1	Wenshan	Taipei	—N/a	0.000	2007-7-4	Wenhu line Circular line Shenkeng LRT
—N/a	Angle Station 1 轉角一	—N/a		Wenshan	Taipei	1.297	—N/a	2007-7-4	—N/a
2	Taipei Zoo South 動物園南	Lateral	95.5	Wenshan	Taipei	1.297	1.297	2007-7-4	—N/a
—N/a	Angle Station 2 轉角二	—N/a		Wenshan	Taipei	1.628	—N/a	2007-7-4	—N/a
3	Zhinan Temple 指南宮	Lateral	264.3	Wenshan	Taipei	1.628	2.925	2007-7-4	—N/a
4	Maokong 貓空	Rotary	299.3	Wenshan	Taipei	1.108	4.033	2007-7-4	—N/a

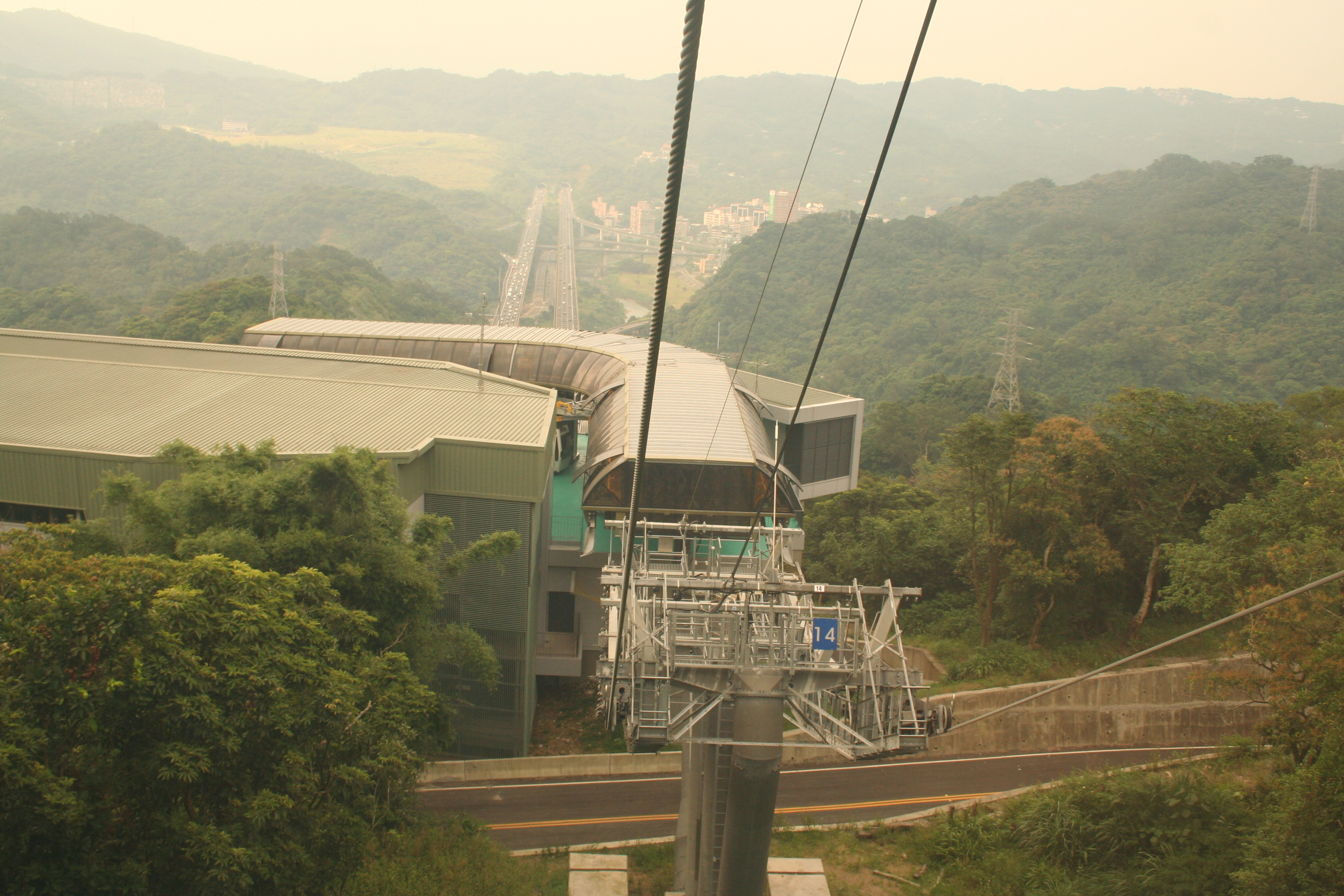
Corner Two station and National Highway No. 3.

On leaving Zhinan Temple or Maokong Stations, regular and frequent minibus services can ferry visitors to destinations around the Maokong area. Minibus services can also deliver passengers directly back to the Taipei Zoo MRT station.

== Fares ==
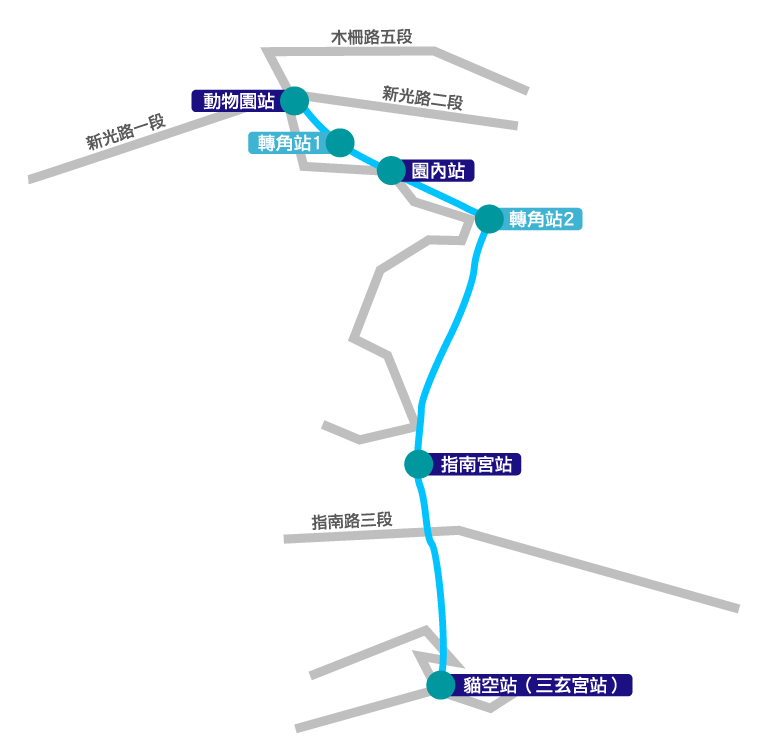
Maokong Gondola Route

As of 2025, the standard fare for the Maokong Gondola is NT$180. Fares can be paid by either purchasing the tickets at the stations or using EasyCard or stored-value card. Tourists can also purchase the Maokong Gondola version of the one-day Taipei Pass for unlimited rides on Taipei buses and MRTs, and up to three gondola rides in one day.

== Crystal cabins ==
Since 30 March 2010, thirty cabins have been retrofitted with 48mm thick glass bottoms, each weighing 213 kg. They operate with a service interval of three minutes. The capacity is limited to five persons per cabin. Crystal cabins, also called “Eyes of Maokong Gondola”, have their own waiting queue and a computer managed ticketing system, instructing passengers to enter the queue at a specified time. Currently, the price for taking a crystal cabin is the same as that of regular cabins. The cost of each cabin modification was NT$200,000.

== See also ==
- Transportation in Taiwan
