= Maokong =

Area in Wenshan, Taipei, Taiwan

Coordinates: 24.9680°N 121.5880°E

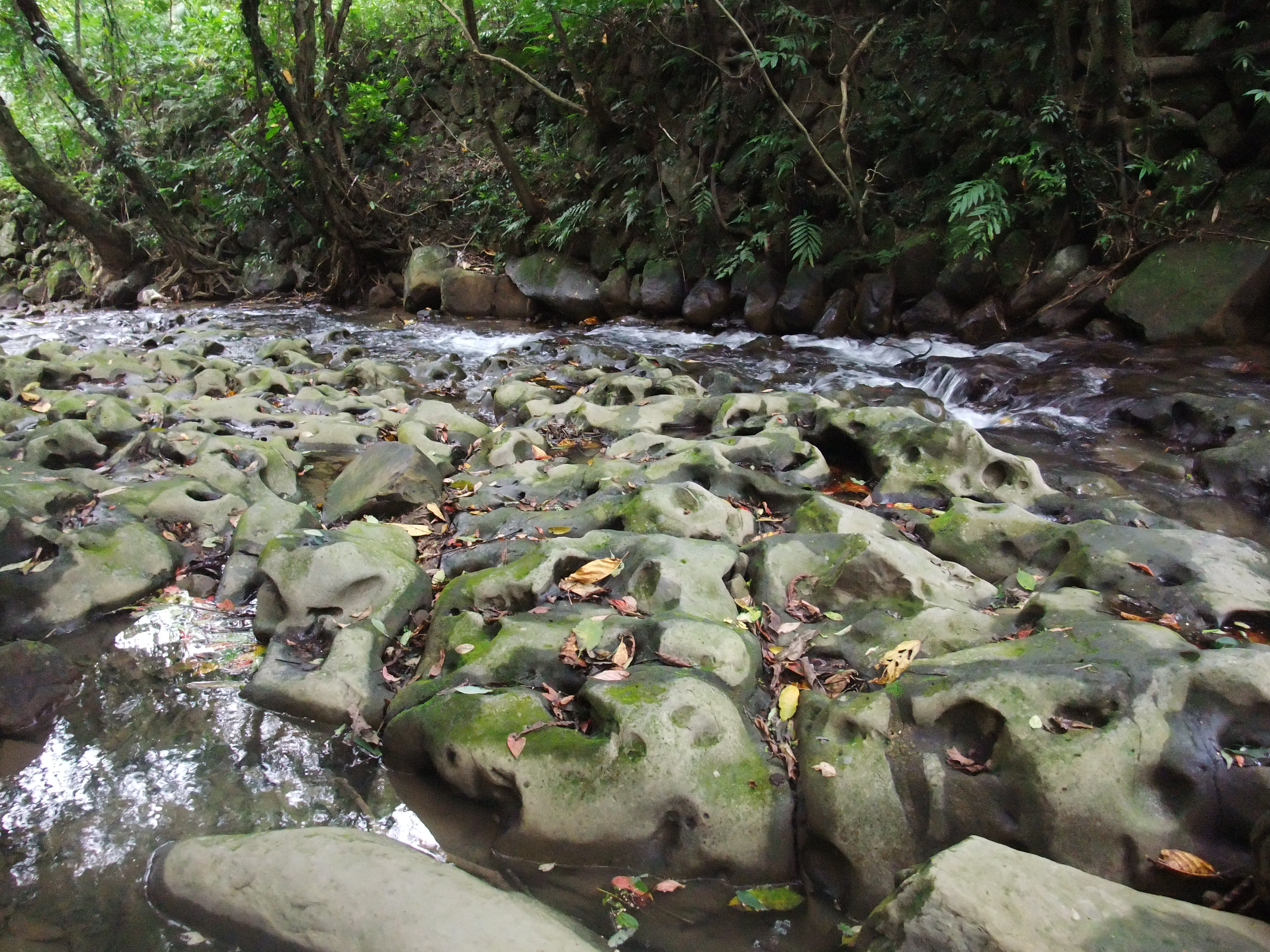
Potholes in Maokong

Maokong (Chinese: 貓空; pinyin: Māokōng; Pe̍h-ōe-jī: Niau-khang; lit. 'cat hole') is an area located in Wenshan District of Taipei, Taiwan. The area used to be the biggest tea growing area of Taipei. There are many intertwining footpaths which have been used to transport tea. Now, it is a popular place for tea culture and viewing the night scenery of Taipei City.

== Etymology ==
A prior theory states that the former name (Chinese: 皺空; Pe̍h-ōe-jī: jiâu-khang; lit. 'roughness-holes'; also 皺孔; jiâu-kháng) refers to pothole formations. A recent publication suggests that the valley area was overrun with masked palm civet and hence its former Hokkien name (貓面; bâ-bīn; 'cat surface'). The current name, derived from Hokkien, was in use by Japanese ruleand is probably derived from the presence of civets (bâ) in said valley (khang).

== Features ==
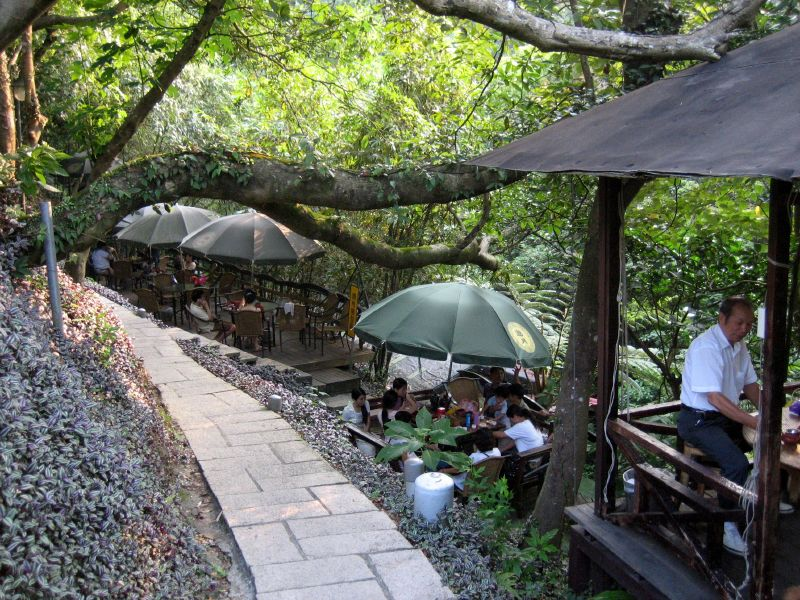
Teahouse scene in Maokong

Maokong is a suburb of Taipei. It sits on the edge of Taipei Basin; the entire city of Taipei can be seen from the mountain, especially on a cloudless day.

There are many pathways for hiking such as from National Chengchi University at the foot of the hill to the top of the mountain. On weekends many people come to Maokong to go hiking and climbing.

Maokong still produces some tea, most notably tieguanyin tea. The Taipei Tea Research and Promotion Center is in Maokong. Many restaurants in the area offer both tea and food. A combination of traditional tea culture, food, and scenery are the main reasons the area has become a popular tourist destination.

== Transportation ==
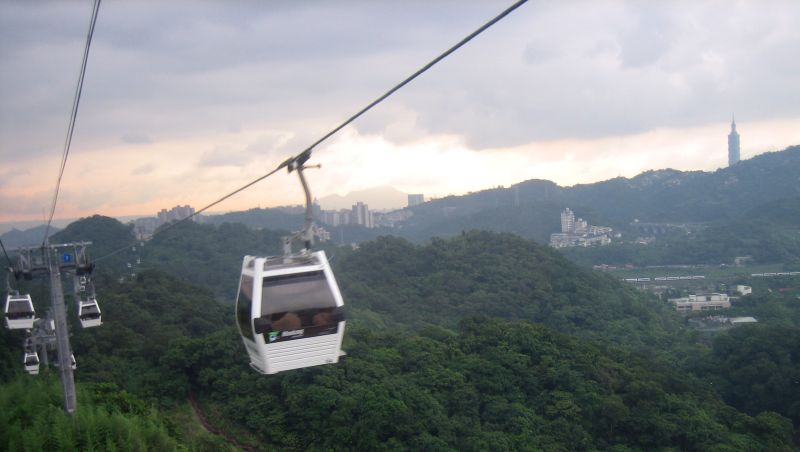
Taipei as seen from Maokong Gondola

The Maokong Gondola, a gondola lift system, started operations on 4 July 2007. It connects to the Wenhu line of the Taipei Metro at Taipei Zoo. The gondola was designed to make reaching Maokong more convenient for local residents and tourists. Service was suspended on 1 October 2008 due to erosion from mudslides under a support pillar. The gondola resumed service on 31 March 2010, after relocation of the pillar and passing safety inspections.

== See also ==
- Tourism in Taiwan
