= Taipei Zoo station =

Metro and gondola station in Taiwan

Taipei Zoo / Y01 動物園
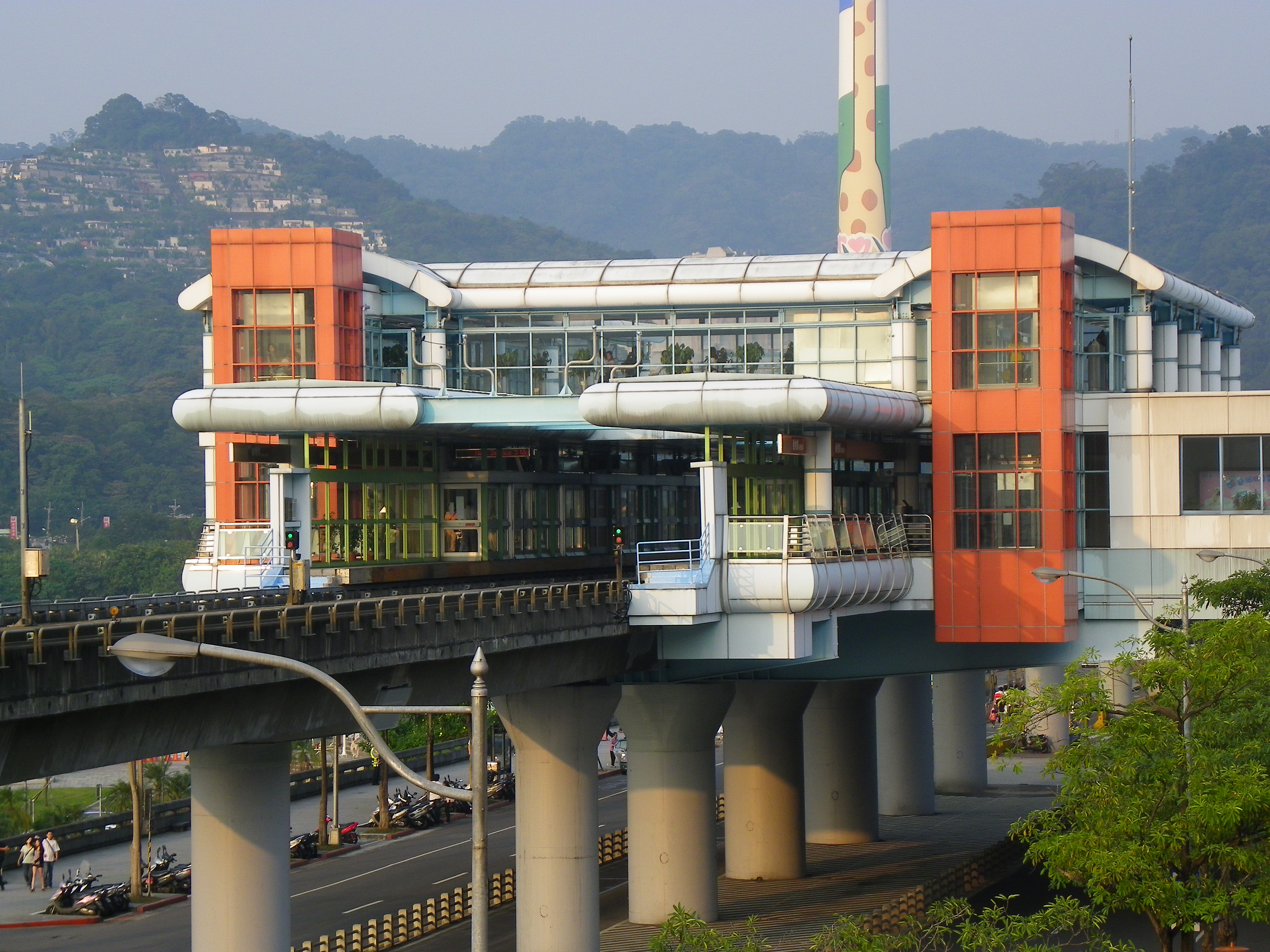
- Taipei Zoo Station

Chinese name
- Traditional Chinese: 動物園
- Simplified Chinese: 动物园
Transcriptions
Standard Mandarin
- Hanyu Pinyin: Dòngwùyuán
- Bopomofo: ㄉㄨㄥˋ ㄨˋ ㄩㄢˊ
Hakka
- Pha̍k-fa-sṳ: Thung-vu̍t-yèn
Southern Min
- Tâi-lô: Tōng-bu̍t-hn̂g

General information
- Location: No. 32, Sec. 2, Xinguang Rd. Wenshan, Taipei; Taiwan
- Coordinates: 24.998447°N 121.579519°E
- System: Taipei Metro
- Operator: Taipei Rapid Transit Corporation
- Lines: Wenhu line; Circular line; Maokong Gondola
- Platforms: 2 sides (Wenhu line); 1 island (Circular line)
- Connections: Bus stop

Construction
- Structure type: Elevated (Wenhu line); Underground (Circular line)

Other information
- Station code: / Y01

History
- Opened: 28 March 1996 (Wenhu line); 30 March 2010 (gondola; reopening)
- Opening: June 2031 (Circular line)
- Closed: 1 October 2008 (gondola; structural repairs)

Passengers
- 15,236 daily (December 2024)
- Rank: (Ranked 95 of 119)

Services
Preceding station	Taipei Metro	Following station
Terminus	Wenhu line	Muzha towards Nangang Exhib Center
Terminus	Maokong Gondola	Taipei Zoo South towards Maokong
Future services
Preceding station	New Taipei Metro	Following station
Terminus	Circular line	National Chengchi University towards Jiannan Road
Terminus	Shenkeng LRT opening December 2025	??? towards Shiding
Location

Taipei Zoo station (Chinese: 動物園站) is a terminus on the Wenhu line and Maokong Gondola of the Taipei Metro, and the planned Circular line of the New Taipei Metro. It is located in the Wenshan District, Taipei, Taiwan.

== Station overview ==
This three-level, elevated station features two side platforms and two exits. It is located on Xinguang Rd., Sec. 2. In order to deal with patronage to the zoo, an underground parking lot was constructed. It connects to the Maokong Gondola and Taipei Zoo.

It will be a transfer station and terminus with Circular Line in 2029, which is expected to bring convenience to districts in outer Taipei and New Taipei by saving a lot of commuting time. Currently, a trip from Taipei Zoo to Dapinglin requires 40 minutes and two transfers, while a trip from Taipei Zoo to Jingan requires 36 minutes and also two transfers. However, after the opening of phase 2 of the Circular line, a trip to Dapinglin will only take 11 minutes without requiring any transfers, and a trip to Jingan will only take 20 minutes, which also will not require any transfers.

=== History ===
The station was opened on 28 March 1996. To deal with the increasing patronage, construction began on a second exit in November 2001 before the opening in November 2002. On 20 March 2010, the underground parking lot and bus transfer station opened.

On 4 July 2007, the Maokong Gondola Taipei Zoo Station opened. Due to structural problems resulting from Typhoon Jangmi, the station was closed along with the gondola system on 1 October 2008, and was officially reopened on 30 March 2010.

== Station layout ==
4F	Connecting level	Platforms-connecting overpass
3F	Wenhu line Concourse	Lobby, information desk, automatic ticket dispensing machines, one-way faregates
3F	Side platform, doors will open on the right
3F	Platform 1	← Wenhu line toward Taipei Nangang Exhibition Center (BR02 Muzha)
3F	Platform 2	→ Wenhu line termination platform (not carry passengers)
3F	Side platform, doors will open on the right
2F	Mezzanine	Transitlink floor for stairs and escalators, restrooms
1F	Circular line concourse	Exit/entrance, lobby, information desk, automatic ticket dispensing machines, one-way faregates Restrooms (under construction)

B2	Platform 1	Circular line toward Jiannan Road (Y02 National Chengchi University)
B2	Island platform, under construction
B2	Platform 2	Circular line toward Jiannan Road (Y02 National Chengchi University)

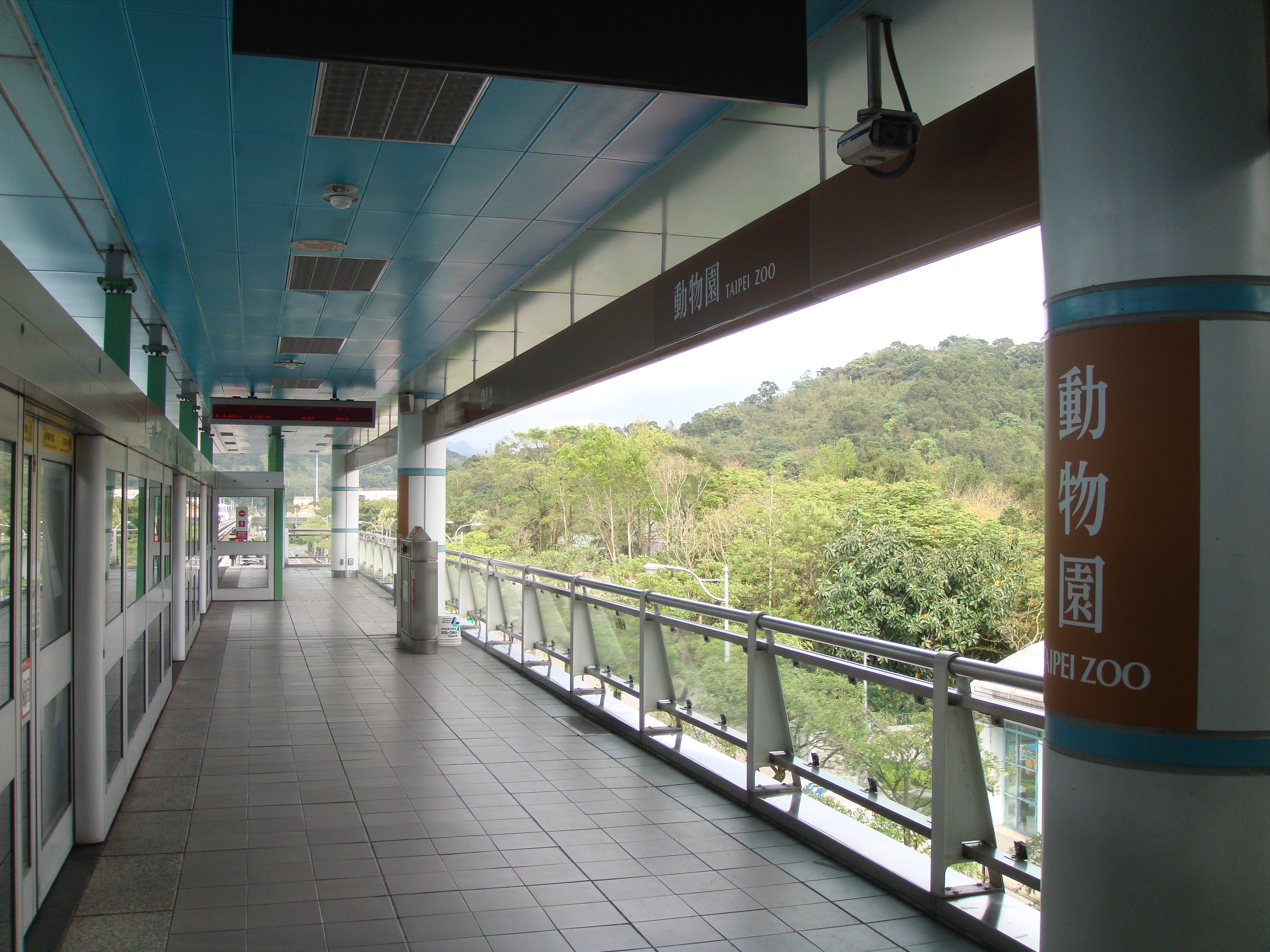
Taipei Zoo station platform

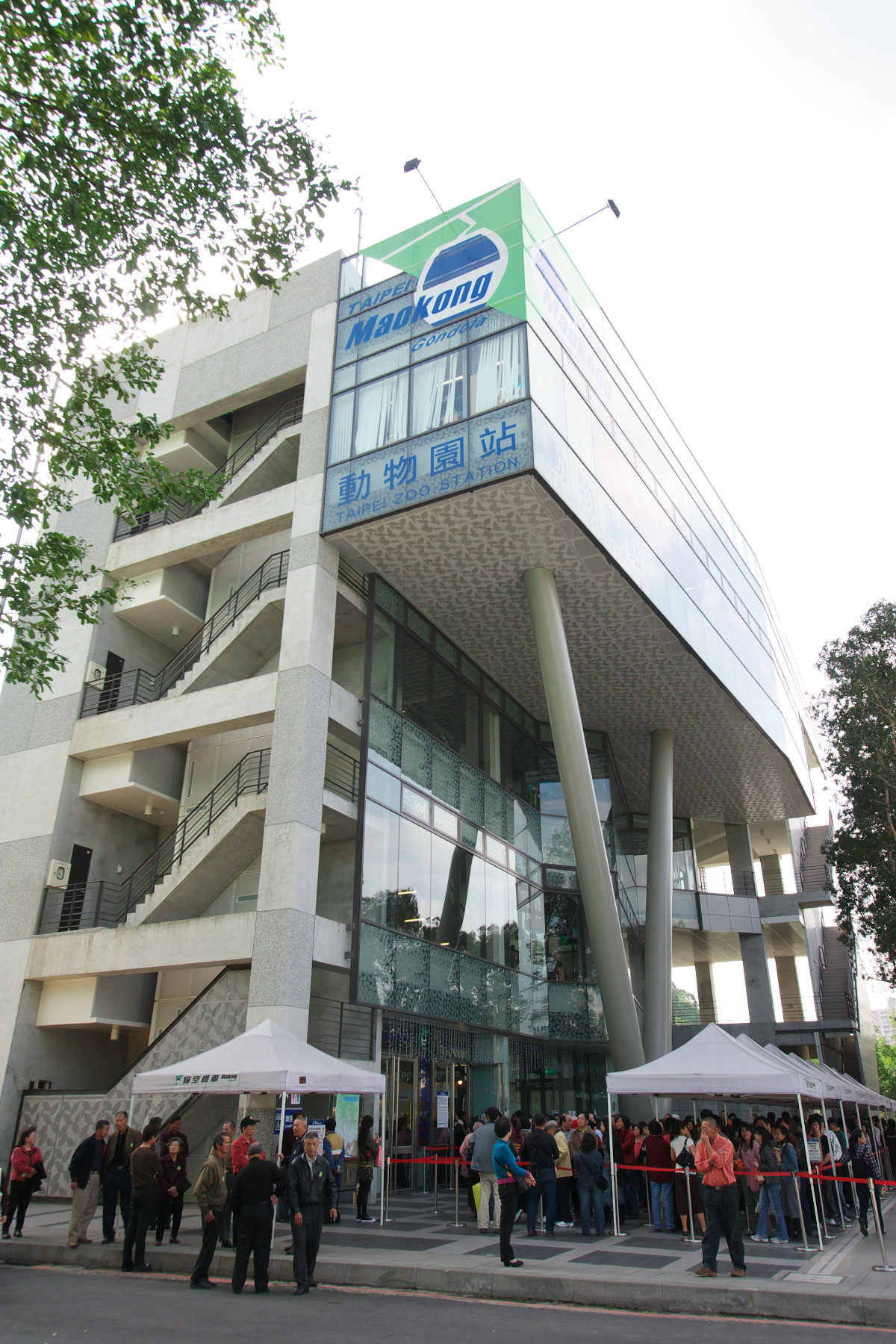
Maokong Gondola Taipei Zoo station

== Around the station ==
- Taipei Zoo
- Jingmei River
- Daonan Riverside Park
- National Chengchi University
