= Jinhua Park =

Park in Da'an, Taipei, Taiwan

- 金華公園
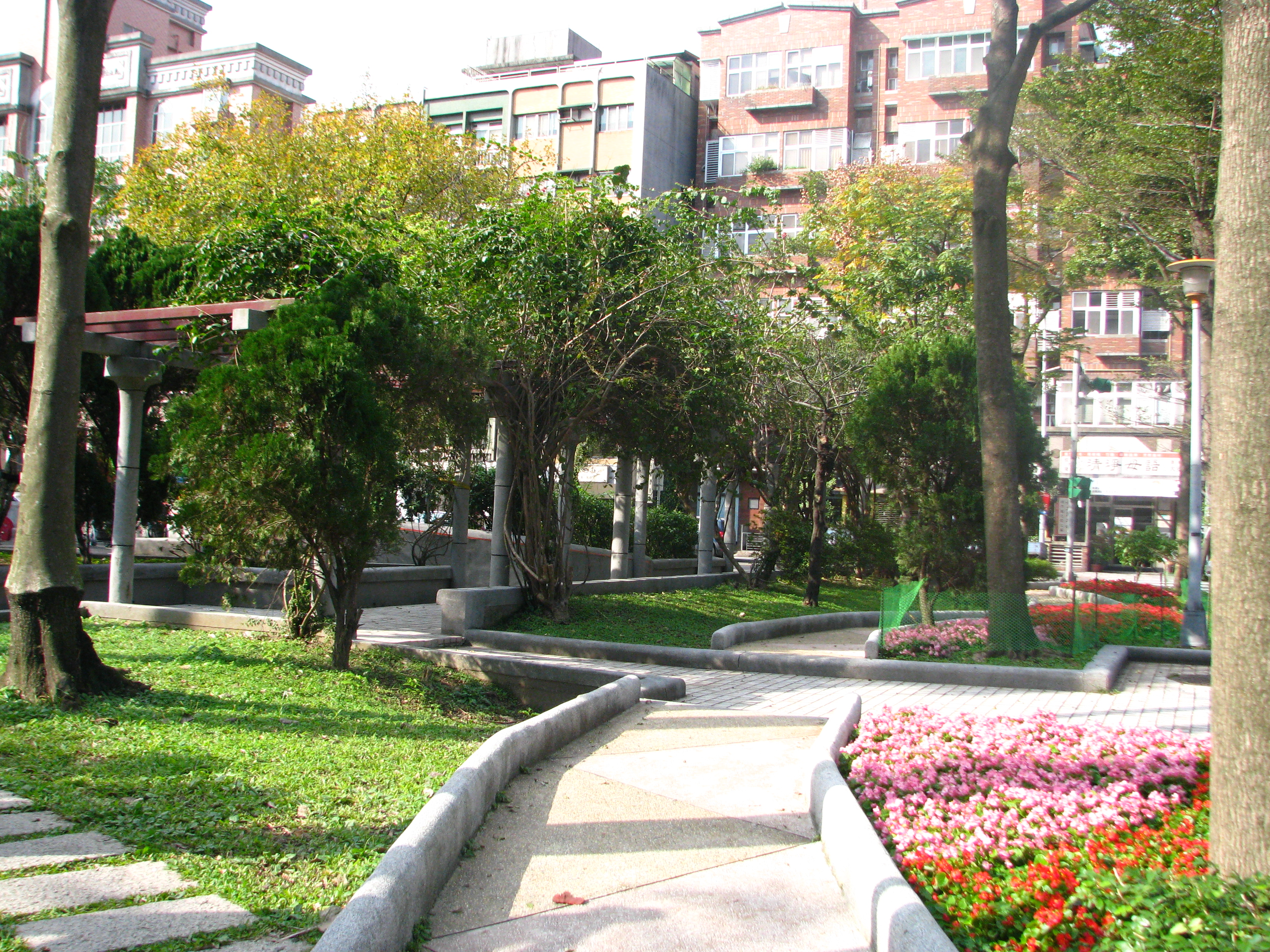
- Interactive map of Jinhua Park
- Type: park
- Location: Da'an, Taipei, Taiwan
- Coordinates: 25°01′46.9″N 121°31′52.0″E
- Opening: 1998
- Public transit: Dongmen Station

Jinhua Park (traditional Chinese: 金華公園; simplified Chinese: 金华公园; pinyin: Jīnhuá Gōngyuán) is a park in Da'an District, Taipei, Taiwan.

== History ==
The park was established in 1998.

== Transportation ==
The park is accessible within walking distance south of Dongmen Station of Taipei Metro.

== See also ==
- List of parks in Taiwan
- List of tourist attractions in Taiwan
