= Daan Forest Park =

Park in Taipei, Taiwan

Daan Forest Park 大安森林公園
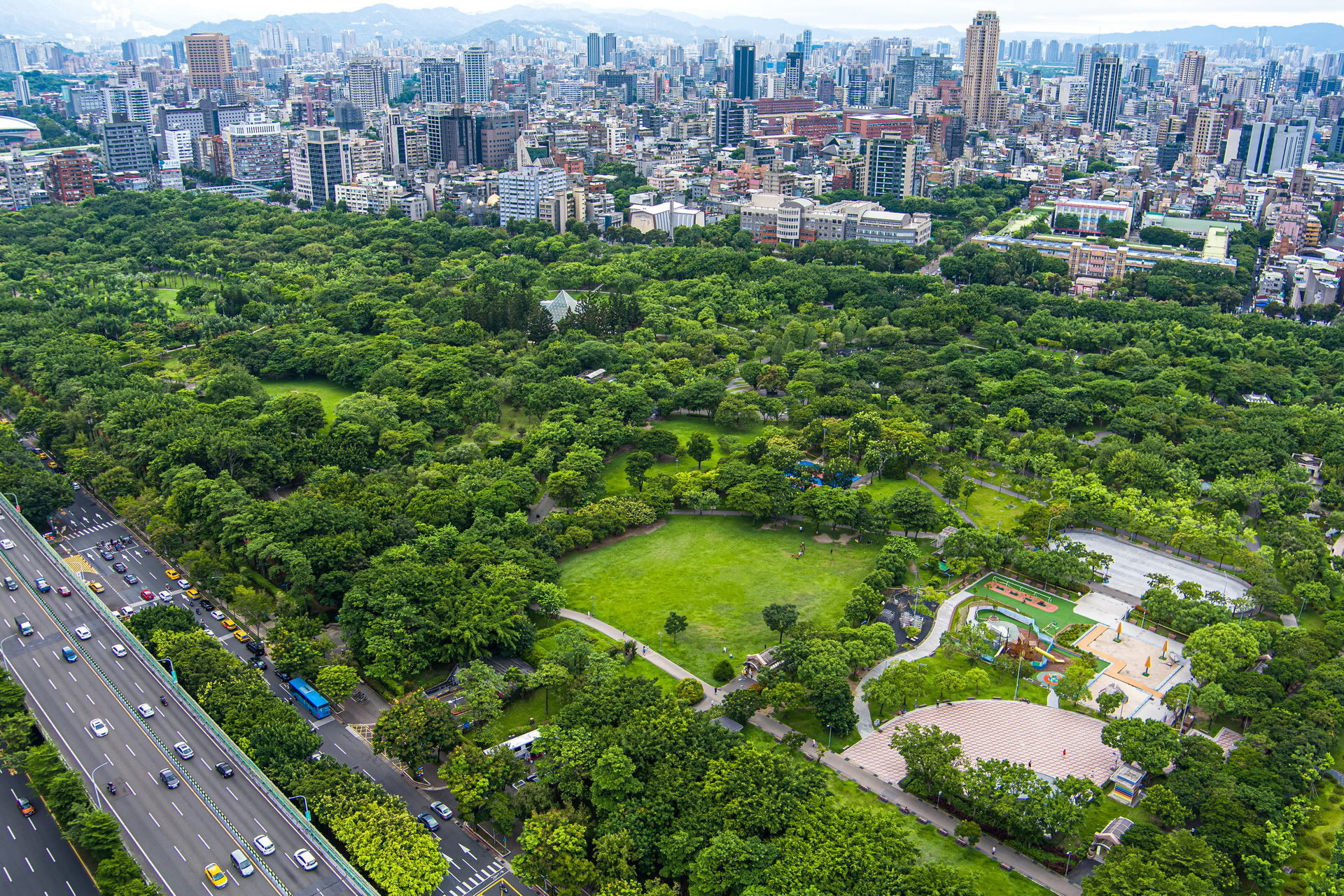
- Interactive map of Daan Forest Park 大安森林公園
- Type: Municipal
- Location: Taipei, Taiwan
- Coordinates: 25°01′47″N 121°32′10″E
- Area: 259,293 m^{2} (64.073 acres)
- Opened: 29 March 1994
- Open: All year
- Parking: Underground parking garage

Daan Forest Park
- Traditional Chinese: 大安森林公園
- Simplified Chinese: 大安森林公园
Transcriptions
Standard Mandarin
- Hanyu Pinyin: Dàān Sēnlíng Gōngyuán
- Bopomofo: ㄉㄚˋ ㄢ ㄙㄣ ㄌㄧㄣˊ ㄍㄨㄥ ㄩㄢˊ
- IPA: [tâ.án sə́n.lǐn kʊ́ŋ.ɥɛ̌n]

Daan Forest Park (Chinese: 大安森林公園) is a public park near the centre of the Da'an District of Taipei, Taiwan. The park occupies twenty-six hectares and is bordered on its north, south, east, and west by Xinyi Road (信義路), Heping E. Road (和平東路), Jianguo S. Road (建國南路), and Xinsheng S. Road (新生南路), respectively. The park is used by residents of Taipei as a green activity space and for various outdoor activities. The park was created in 1994 after the eviction of longtime squatters and the demolition of illegal buildings on municipal land.

== History ==
The land that would become Daan Forest Park was designated urban parkland in 1932 by Japanese authorities as Park Number Seven. The Republic of China government used these areas to build military dependents' villages. Aside from the military facilities, the International House of Taipei was also constructed, and the land housed several thousand people at its peak population density, many of them refugees of the Chinese Civil War. The Taipei City Government planned to build a park on the land by 1989, after a previous decision to construct a stadium met with opposition from environmentalists. After a long legal battle, 12,000 squatters were evicted from an informal settlement in April 1992, allowing the Daan Forest Park to be built. Prior to the park's formal opening to the public on 29 March 1994, a 1985 statue of Guanyin created by Yuyu Yang became a subject of controversy. Former residents of the Daan Forest Park wanted it removed but were opposed by several prominent Buddhist leaders, including Chao-hwei, Hsing Yun and Ming Kuang. The municipal government eventually agreed to retain the statue as public art if it were not used for religious purposes. Despite opening to the public in March 1994, the park's facilities were not fully operational and construction was still underway, leading to the nickname "Mud Park".

Daan Forest Park was intended to play a similar role as other major city parks such as New York City's Central Park and London's Hyde Park, acting as the "lungs of Taipei city" and as respite for residents from the bustle of life in Taipei. Similar to the large parks of other cities, Daan Park is surrounded by high price luxury condominiums that fetch a premium due to their desirable views, some reaching the price of $400 million New Taiwan dollars (approximately $14 million US dollars) in 2012.

== Ecology ==
The park is home to a wide variety of animals including squirrels, and several species of birds, ducks, egrets, and turtles.

== Facilities ==
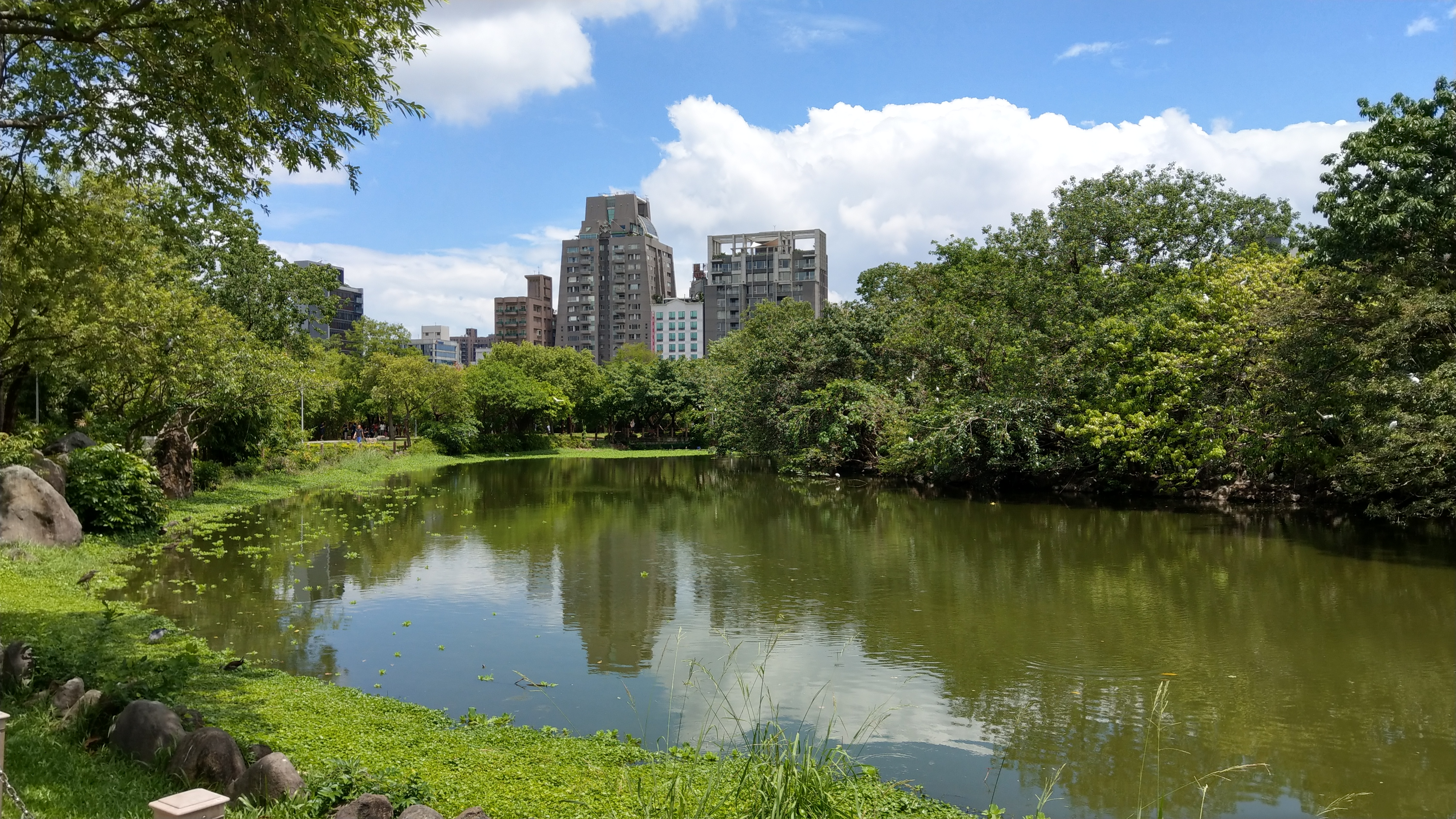
The Ecological Pool in the centre of Daan Forest Park

Daan Forest park contains two ponds, several pavilions, and strolling paths, a desacralized statue of the Buddhist Goddess Guanyin, as well as cultural recreational facilities such as an amphitheatre, children's playground, a jogging loop, and a skating rink. It also contains an underground parking garage.

== Events ==
- Islamic Cultural Fair
- Daan Forest Park Azalea Festival

== Transportation ==
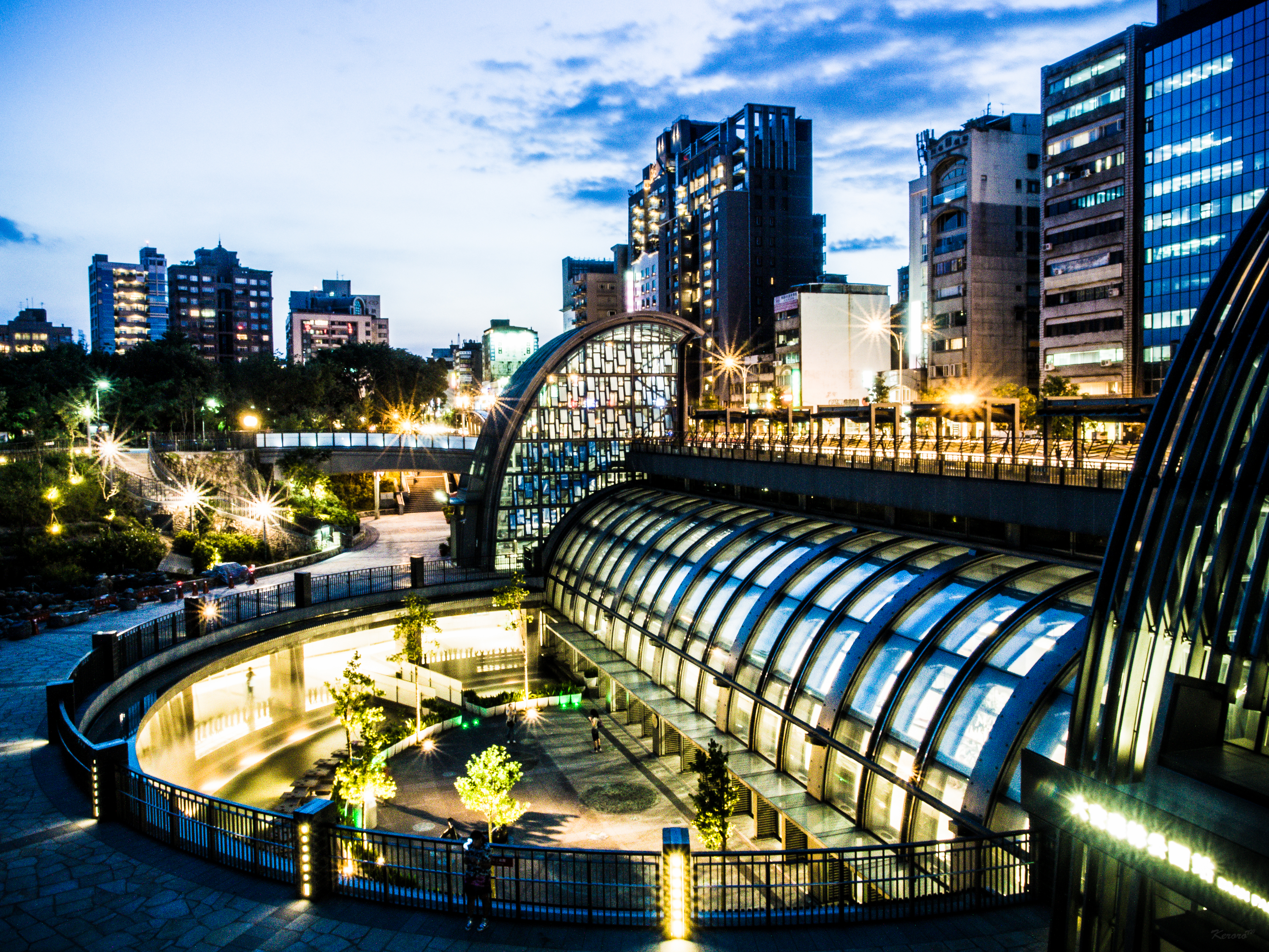
Daan Forest Park Metro Station

Direct access to the park by Taipei Metro is provided by the Daan Park Station located at the Northern end of the park. However, the park is also accessible within walking distance west from Daan Station of the Taipei Metro and east from Dongmen Station.

== See also ==
- List of parks in Taiwan
