= Taipei Hakka Culture Hall =

Cultural center in Da'an, Taipei, Taiwan

- 臺北市客家文化會館
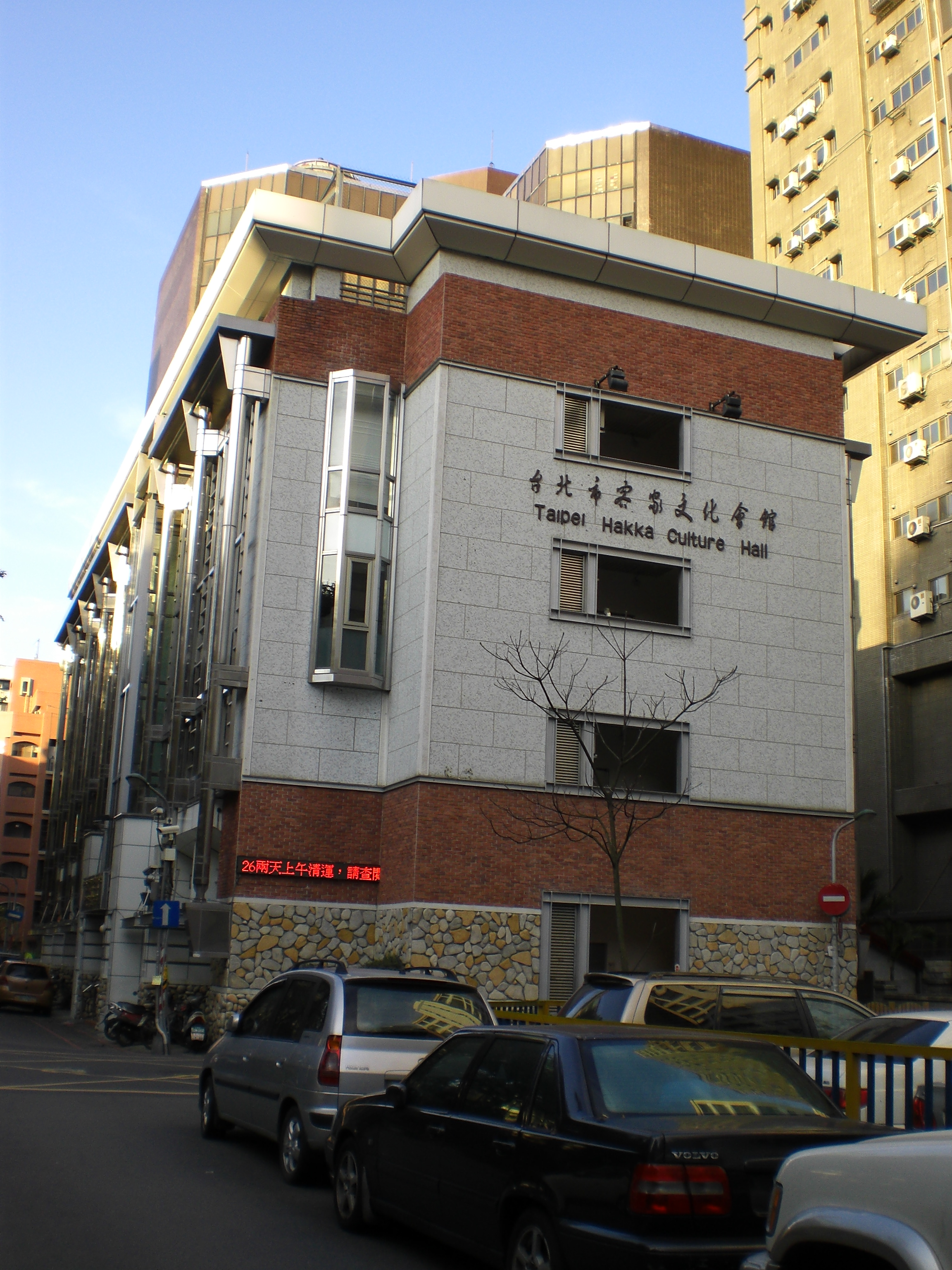
- Interactive map of the Taipei Hakka Culture Hall area

General information
- Type: cultural center
- Location: Da'an, Taipei, Taiwan
- Coordinates: 25°02′04.3″N 121°32′34.4″E
- Opened: 3 October 1998
- Owner: Hakka Affairs Commission, Taipei City Government

The Taipei Hakka Culture Hall (traditional Chinese: 臺北市客家文化會館; simplified Chinese: 台北市客家文化会馆; pinyin: Táiběi Shì Kèjiā Wénhuà Kuàiguǎn) is a cultural center in Da'an District, Taipei, Taiwan which acts as a center for cultural exchange between the Hakka community and Taipei residence.

== History ==
The hall was established on 3 October 1998.

== Features ==
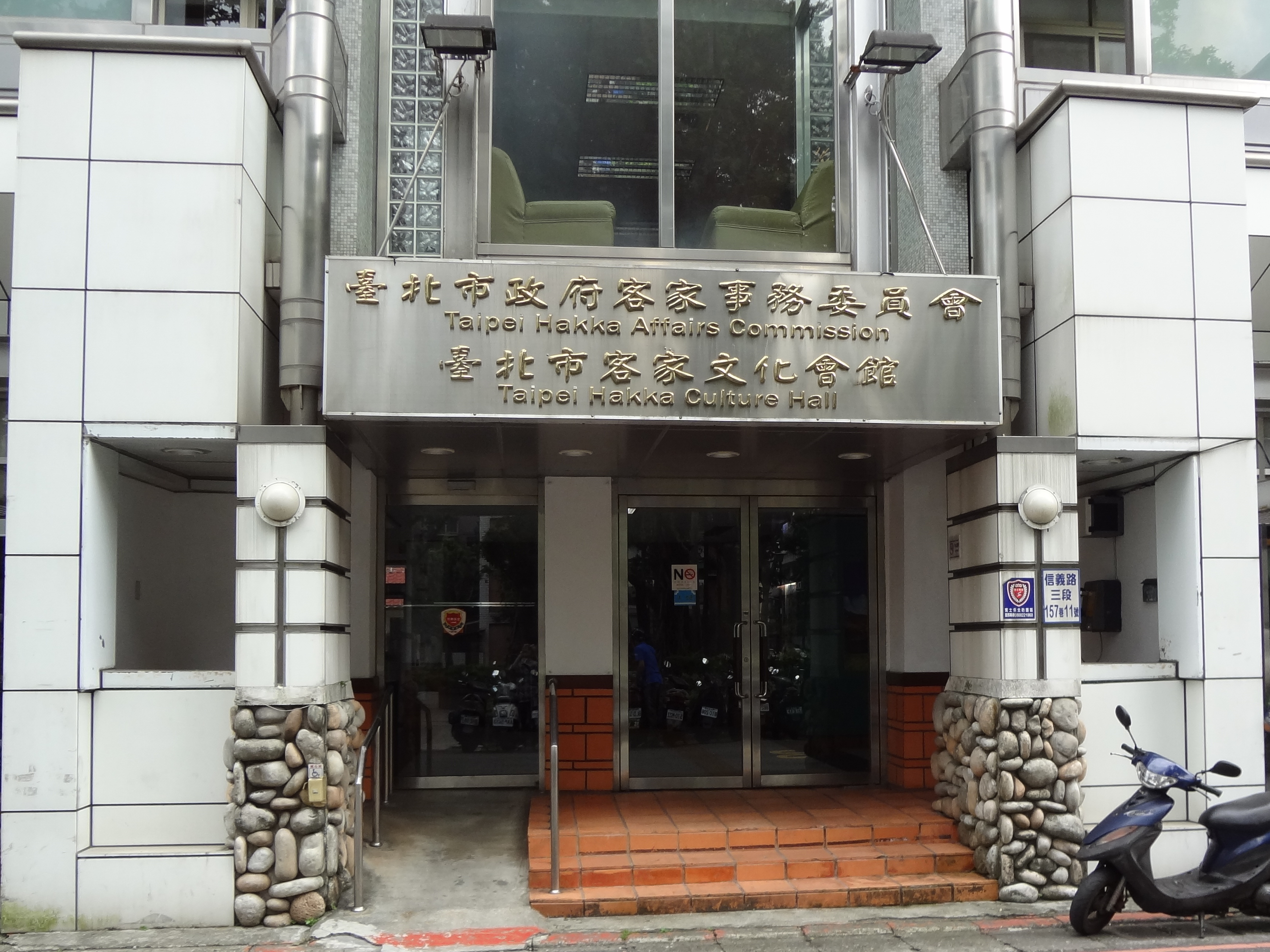
Taipei Hakka Culture Hall entry

The hall consists of lobby displaying traditional Hakka home. Other buildings usually host artistic and cultural exhibits, as well as stage traditional dancing and opera performances. The hall also has classrooms and meeting rooms used for other different functions.

== Transportation ==
The cultural center is accessible within walking distance North West from Daan Station of Taipei Metro.

== See also ==
- List of tourist attractions in Taiwan
- Taiwanese people
