= Liuzhangli metro station =

Metro station in Taipei, Taiwan

Liuzhangli 六張犁
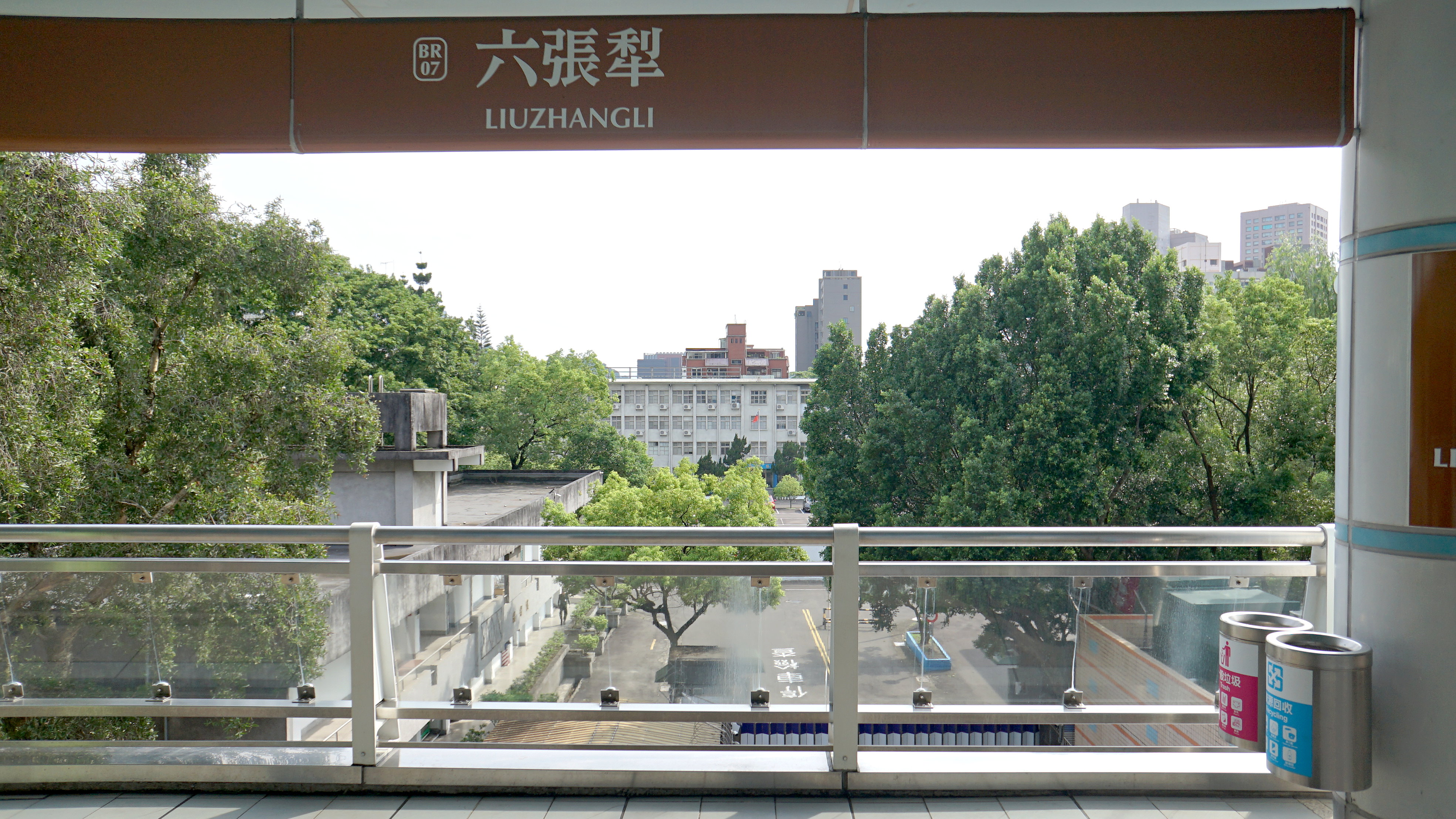
- Platform

Chinese name
- Traditional Chinese: 六張犁
- Simplified Chinese: 六张犁
- Literal meaning: Six sheet plough
Transcriptions
Standard Mandarin
- Hanyu Pinyin: Liùzhānglí
- Bopomofo: ㄌㄧㄡˋ ㄓㄤ ㄌㄧˊ
- Wade–Giles: Liu⁴-chang¹ Li²
Hakka
- Pha̍k-fa-sṳ: Liuk-chông-lài
Southern Min
- Hokkien POJ: La̍k-tiuⁿ-lê
- Tâi-lô: La̍k-tiunn-lê

General information
- Location: No. 168, Sec. 3, Heping E. Rd. Da’an and Xinyi, Taipei; Taiwan
- Coordinates: 25.023998°N 121.55296°E
- System: Taipei Metro station
- Operator: Taipei Metro
- Line: Wenhu line
- Connections: Bus stop

Construction
- Structure type: Elevated

Other information
- Station code: BR07

History
- Opened: 28 March 1996; 30 years ago
- Former names: Liuchang Li (until 2003)

Passengers
- 22,337 daily (December 2024)
- Rank: (Ranked 76 of 119)

Services
Preceding station	Taipei Metro	Following station
Linguang towards Taipei Zoo	Wenhu line	Technology Building towards Nangang Exhib Center
Location

Liuzhangli station (formerly transliterated as Liuchang Li Station until 2003) is a station on the Brown Line of the Taipei Metro, located on the border of the Da'an and Xinyi districts of Taipei, Taiwan.

== Station overview ==
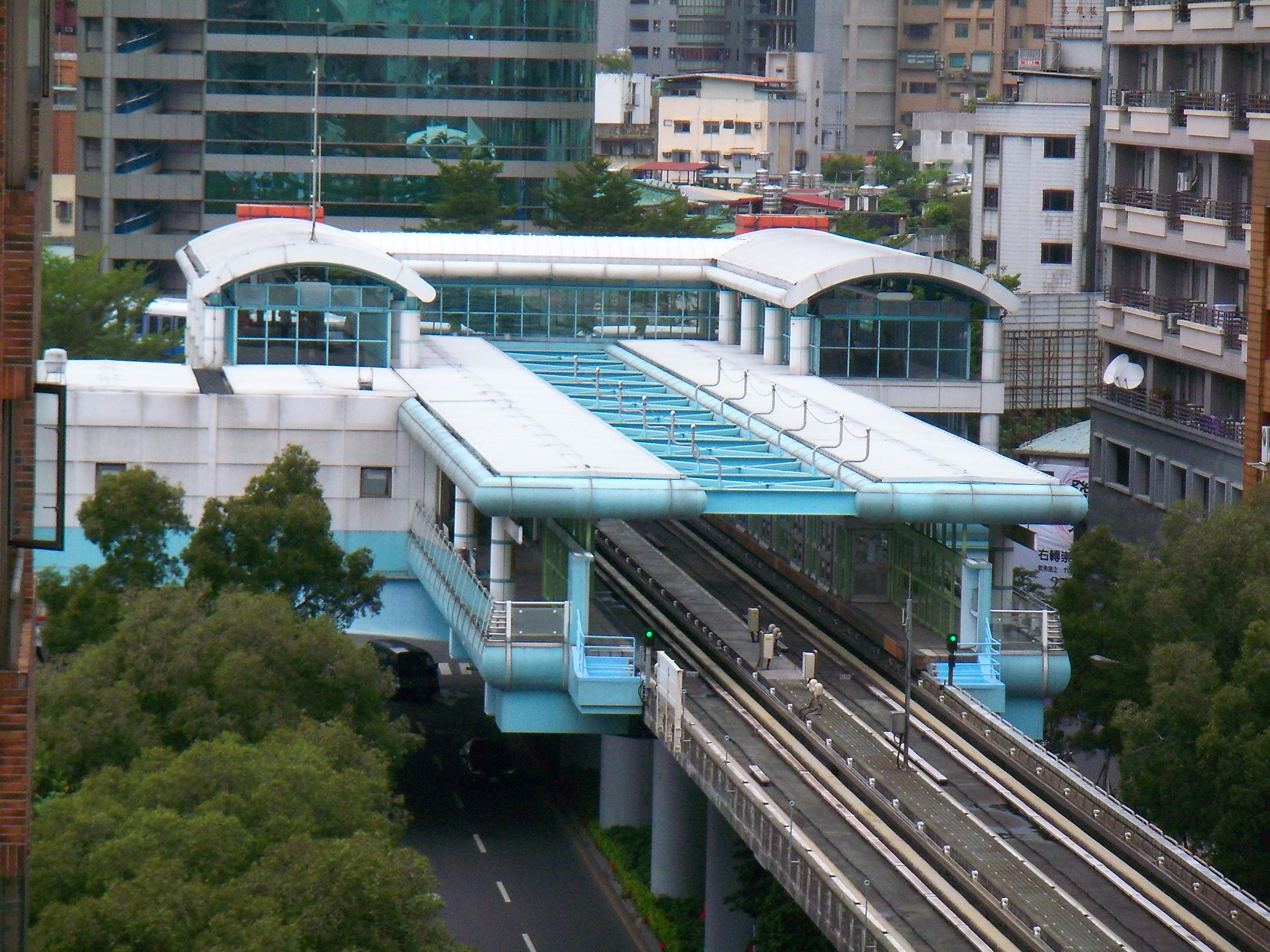
Liuzhangli station

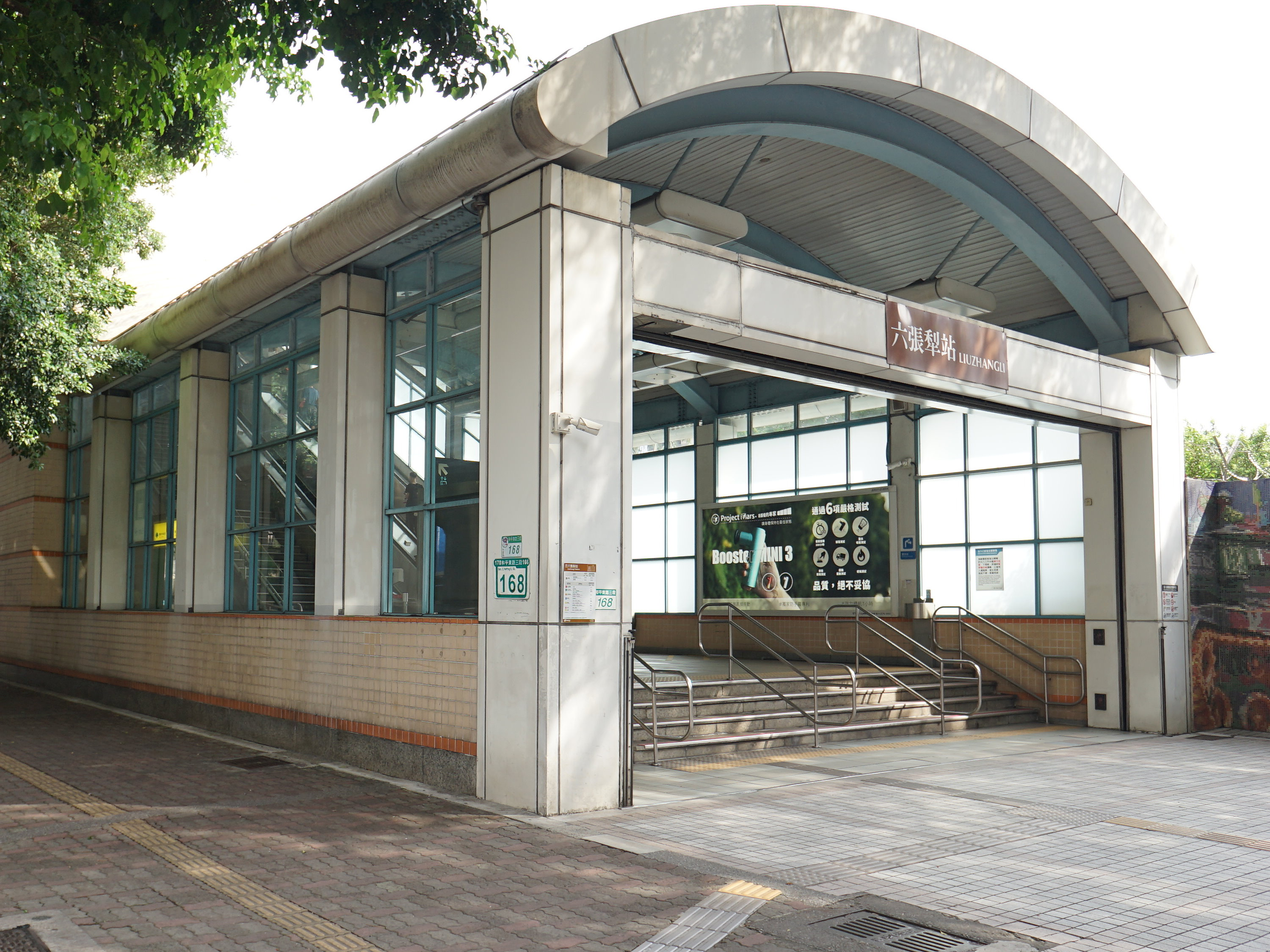
Station exit

The three-level, elevated station has two side platforms, and has one exit. It is located at the intersection of Heping East Rd. and Keelung Rd.

== Station layout ==
4F	Connecting level	Platforms-connecting overpass
3F
3F	Side platform, doors will open on the right
3F	Platform 1	← Wenhu line toward Taipei Nangang Exhibition Center (BR08 Technology Building)
3F	Platform 2	→ Wenhu line toward Taipei Zoo (BR06 Linguang) →
3F	Side platform, doors will open on the right
3F	Concourse
3F	Concourse	Lobby, information desk, automatic ticket dispensing machines, one-way faregates, restrooms

1F	Street level	Exit/entrance

=== Exits ===
- Single exit: Intersection of Heping E. Rd. and Keelung Rd.

== Around the station ==
- Ministry of Justice Taipei City Investigations Office
- Martial Law Era Victims Memorial Park
- Far Eastern Business Center
- Jianan Elementary School
- George Vocational High School of Taipei
- Taiwan Mobile Building
- Chung-Hua Institution for Economic Research
- The Mall
