= Technology Building metro station =

Metro station in Taipei, Taiwan

Technology Building 科技大樓
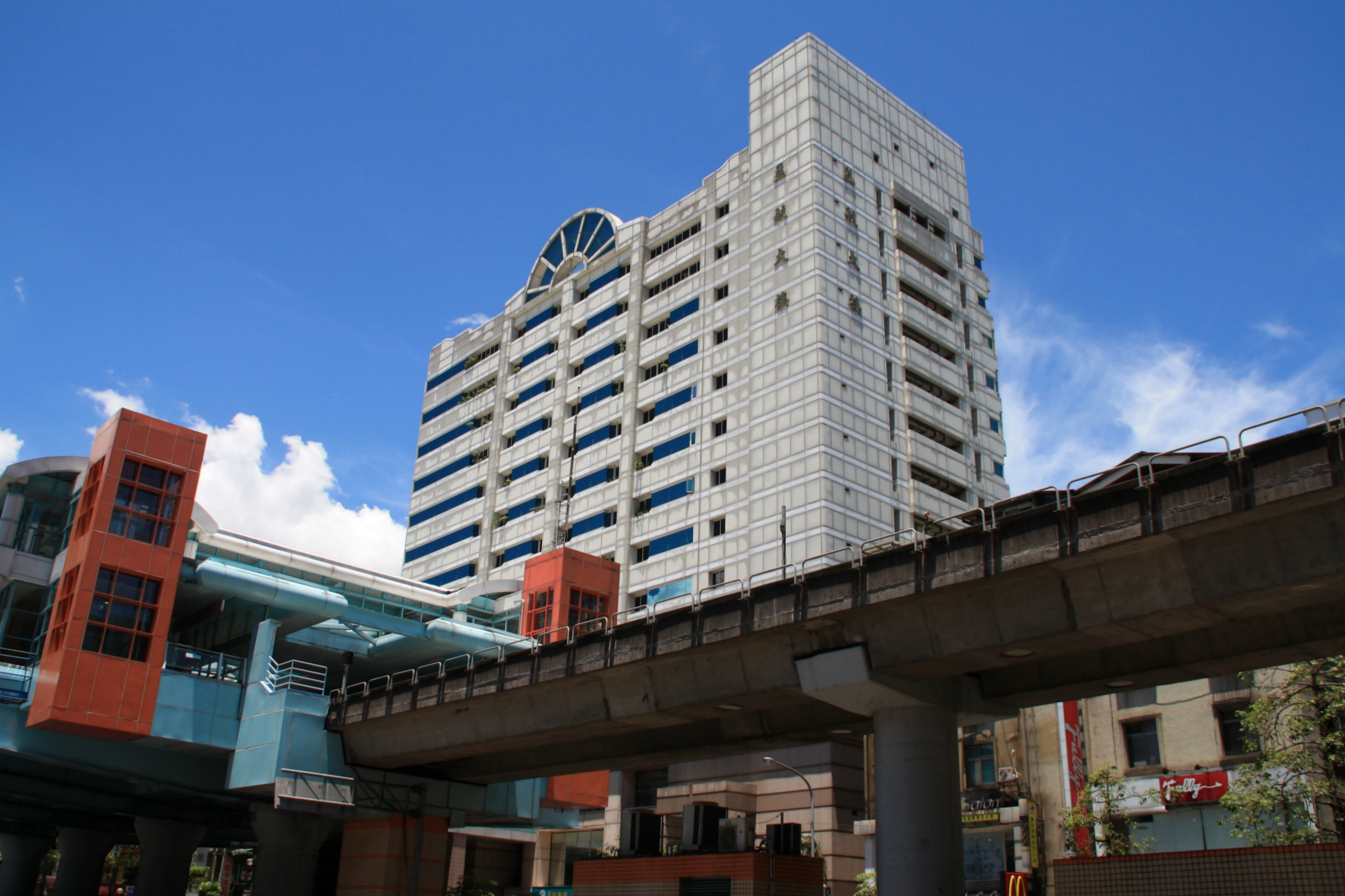
- Technology Building station platform

Chinese name
- Traditional Chinese: 科技大樓
- Simplified Chinese: 科技大楼
Transcriptions
Standard Mandarin
- Hanyu Pinyin: Kējì Dàlóu
- Bopomofo: ㄎㄜ ㄐㄧˋ ㄉㄚˋ ㄌㄡˊ
Hakka
- Pha̍k-fa-sṳ: Khô-kî Thai-lèu
Southern Min
- Hokkien POJ: Kho-ki Toā-lâu
- Tâi-lô: Kho-ki Tuā-lâu

General information
- Location: No. 235, Sec. 2, Fuxing S. Rd. Da’an, Taipei; Taiwan
- Coordinates: 25.03297°N 121.543615°E
- Operator: Taipei Metro
- Line: Wenhu line
- Connections: Bus stop

Construction
- Structure type: Elevated

Other information
- Station code: BR08

History
- Opened: 28 March 1996; 30 years ago

Passengers
- daily (December 2024)
- Rank: 71 out of 109 and 5 others

Services
Preceding station	Taipei Metro	Following station
Liuzhangli towards Taipei Zoo	Wenhu line	Daan towards Nangang Exhib Center
Location

Technology Building station is a station on the Wenhu line of the Taipei Metro, located in Daan District, Taipei, Taiwan.

== Station overview ==
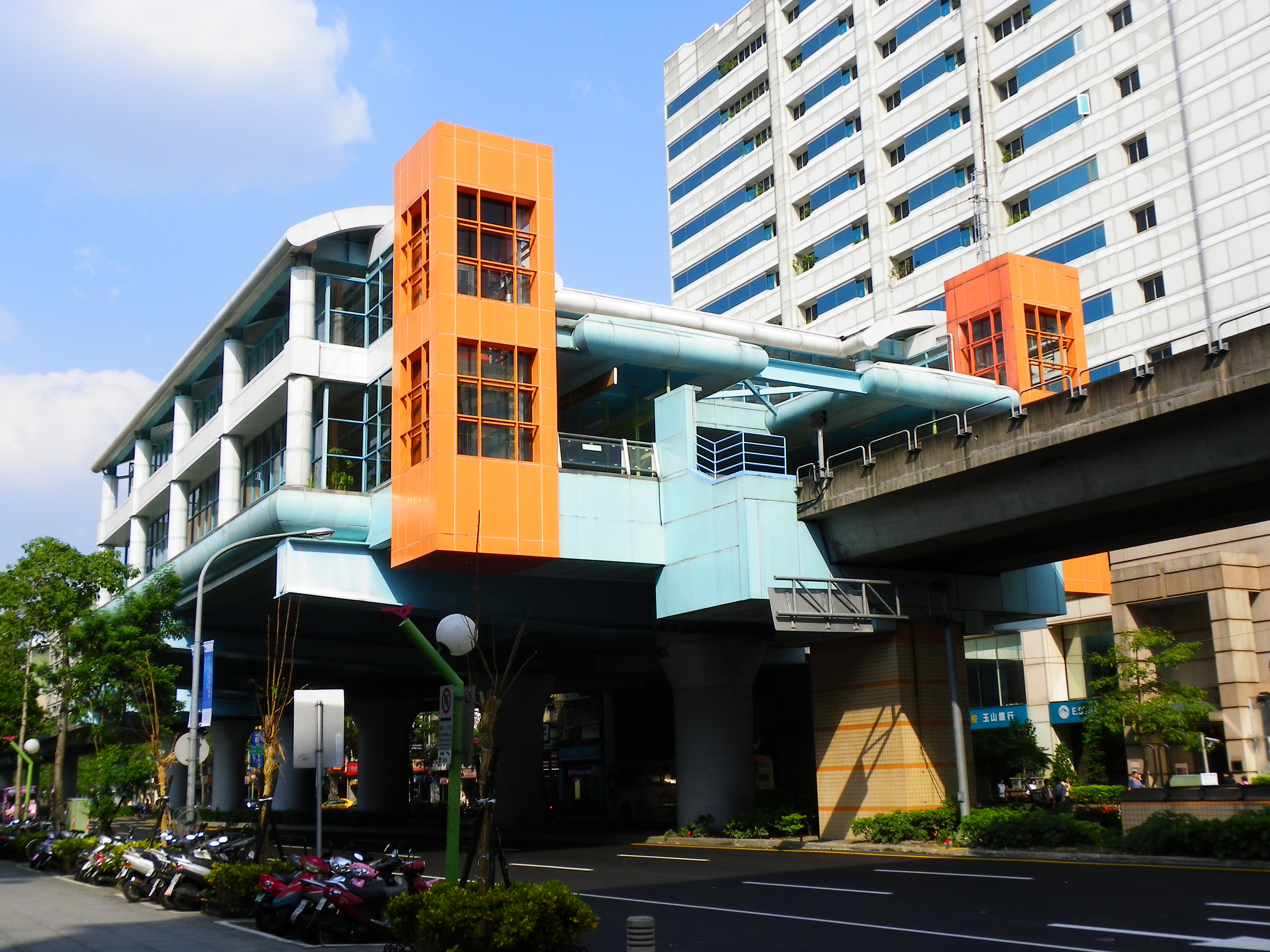
Technology Building station

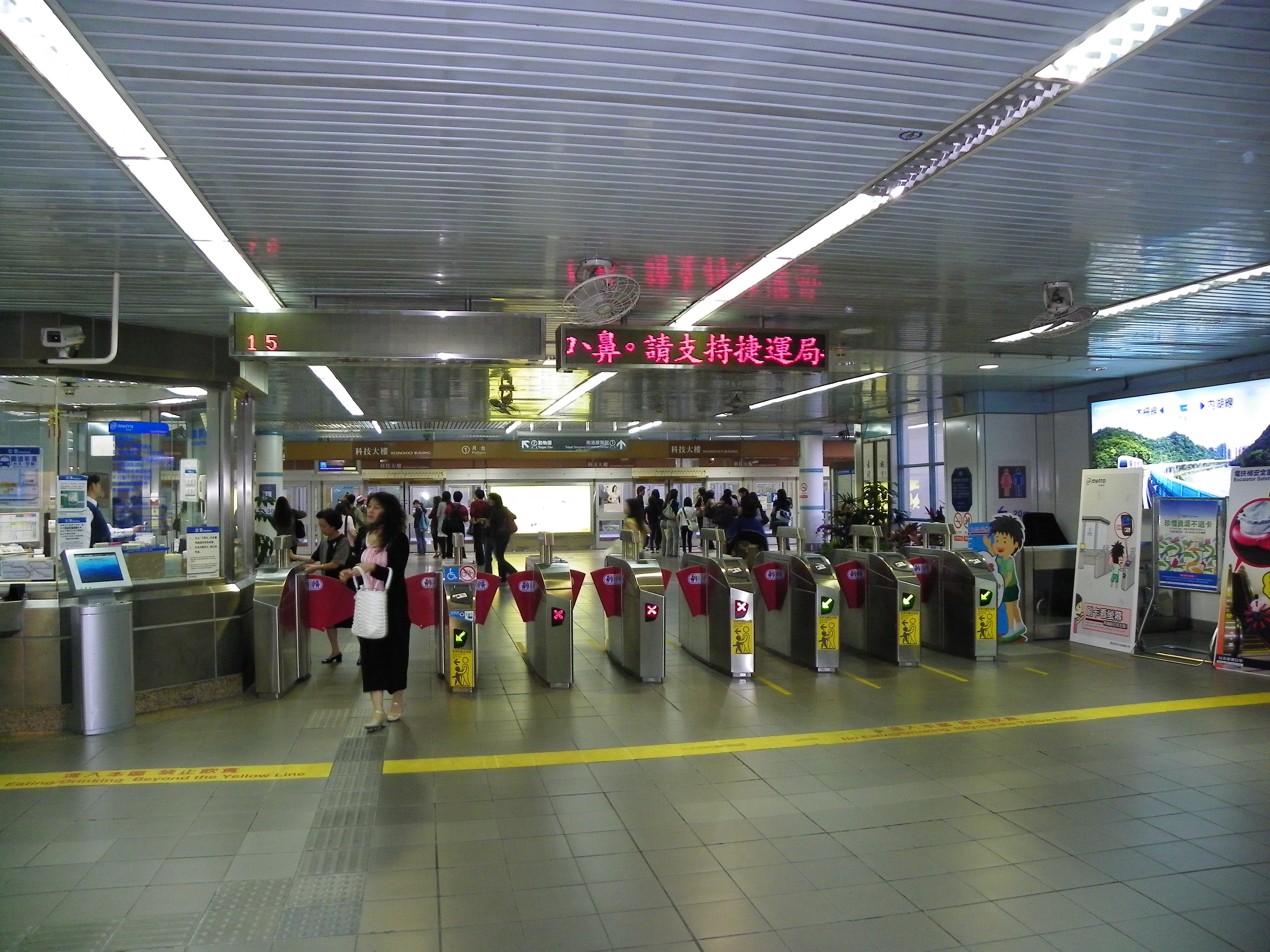
Inside Technology Building station

The three-level, elevated station has two side platforms and two exits. It is located on Fuxing South Rd., near the intersection with Heping East Rd. The nearby Technology Building houses Taiwan's National Science and Technology Council. Between this station and the adjacent Liuzhangli station, there is a 90-degree turn.

== Station layout ==
4F	Connecting level	Platforms-connecting overpass
3F
3F	Concourse
3F	Concourse	Lobby, information desk, automatic ticket dispensing machines, one-way faregates, restrooms
3F	Side platform, doors will open on the right
3F	Platform 1	← Wenhu line toward Taipei Nangang Exhibition Center (BR09 Daan)
3F	Platform 2	→ Wenhu line toward Taipei Zoo (BR07 Liuzhangli) →
3F	Side platform, doors will open on the right

2F	Mezzanine	Transitlink floor for stairs and escalators

1F	Street level	Exit/Eetrance

=== Exits ===
- Exit 1: Near the intersection of Fuxing S. Rd. Sec. 2 and Heping East Rd.
- Exit 2:

== Around the station ==
- Apostolic Nunciature to China
- National Science and Technology Council (Technology Building)
- Taiwan Intellectual Property Office
- Wang Yun-wu Memorial Hall
