= Taiwan Intellectual Property Office =

Patent, copyright, and trademark governing office of Taiwan

Coordinates: 25°01′18.2″N 121°32′29.3″E

Intellectual Property Office, MOEA
- 經濟部智慧財產局

Agency overview
- Formed: 1927
- Jurisdiction: Taiwan (ROC)
- Headquarters: Da'an, Taipei
- Parent agency: Ministry of Economic Affairs
- Website: www.tipo.gov.tw

The Intellectual Property Office (TIPO; Chinese: 經濟部智慧財產局; pinyin: Jīngjìbù Zhìhuì Cáichǎnjú) is the patent, trademark, and copyright office of Taiwan (Republic of China). It operates under the jurisdiction of the Ministry of Economic Affairs (MOEA). As of July 2011, TIPO had a staff of 734 persons, with more than half of them handling patent matters.

== History ==
TIPO was established in 1927. The Republic of China's government is not a member of WIPO, but through the cooperation partnership signed with the French National Institute of Industrial Property (INPI) in 2004, the two national intellectual property offices are able to exchange and learn the updated information and best practices from EU, WIPO, the Madrid Agreement, European Patent Office and APEC.

== Transportation ==
The office is accessible within walking distance south of Technology Building Station of Taipei Metro.

== See also ==
- Patent office
