= Jut Art Museum =

Museum in Da'an, Taipei, Taiwan

- 忠泰美術館
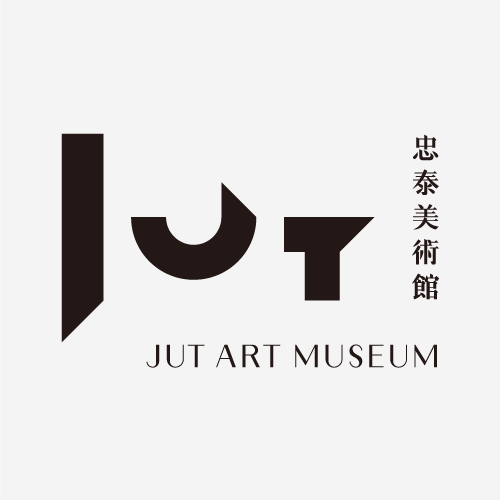
- Established: 2016
- Location: Da'an, Taipei, Taiwan
- Coordinates: 25°02′39.5″N 121°32′14.3″E
- Type: art museum
- Architects: Atsuki Kikuchi, Jun Aoki
- Website: Official website

The Jut Art Museum (JAM; traditional Chinese: 忠泰美術館; simplified Chinese: 忠泰美术馆; pinyin: Zhōng Tài Měishùguǎn) is an art museum in Da'an District, Taipei, Taiwan. It is managed and operated by the Jut Foundation for Arts and Architecture (JFAA).

== Mission ==
Jut Land Development's 30th anniversary, and the Jut Foundation for Arts and Architecture (JFAA)'s 10th birthday, culminates in the establishment of the Jut Art Museum (JAM) in 2016. It is a milestone commemorating the history of Taiwan's architectural aesthetics.

JAM anticipates to act as a new form of platform, catalyst and think tank devoted to corporate social responsibility fulfillment and addressing the societal dynamics of the 21st century. JAM also anticipates to carry on the legacy of "A Better Tomorrow" that defines much of JFAA's work, to become the first museum in Taiwan that is focused on the issues of "future" and "city."

== Vision ==
The Jut Art Museum (JAM), located in the heart of Taipei, is also where the Jut Foundation's debut exhibition of "Museum of Tomorrow" is held. After ten years of circuit shows across the city, the exhibition is now back to where it all started, becoming a "showpiece in the heartland of the city and urban inhabitation."

As an up-and-coming art establishment, JAM serves to explore what our future might hold, and transdisciplinary issues. The curation process of JAM is three-pronged: " future," "urban architecture," and "contemporary art."

Japanese architect Jun Aoki is tasked with spacing designs of JAM. The identification system is developed by Atsuki Kikuchi. This is their first museum collaboration project in Taiwan. JAM – a statement of both sophistication yet cutting-edge conception – is downtown's new architectural and art landmark; and it is poised at remaking and bringing new energy into Taipei's cityscape.

== Architecture ==
The interior space of the Jut Art Museum (JAM) is conceived by Japanese architect Jun Aoki, while Atsuki Kikuchiis responsible for the visual identity system design. In order to connect the world outside of JAM with the space inside, Jun Aoki draws individuals from the bustling city to the tranquility of the museum within. The first floor as a buffer zone of sorts with greenery scattered throughout. It helps visitors unwind and prepare their minds as they unhurriedly head toward the displays on the second floor.

The JAM logo designed by Atsuki Kikuchi incorporates the idea of calligraphy. The letters in the museum's name JUT resemble Asian script which convey a feeling of rhythm, suggesting JAM's twin roles of passing on Asian culture locally and sharing it with the world.

== Exhibitions ==
- TADAO ANDO: ENDEAVORS (2022-06-03 to 2022-09-13)
- The 5th Anniversary of Jut Art Museum 《LIVES: Life, Survival, Living》(2022-03-19 to 2022-07-31)
- Drawing Ambience: Alvin Boyarsky and the Architectural Association (2021-05-08 to 2021-12-05)
- Kengo Kuma: Place / Inspiration (2021-07-24 to 2021-09-12)
- Agravic Starry Sky—Off-Site Project (2019-06-21 to 2021-12-31)
- Broken Landscapes: Have Our Cities Failed? (2021-01-09 to 2021-04-18)
- SOS Brutalism—Save the Concrete Monsters! (2020-07-04 to 2020-11-29)
- Paradise Lost – Gazing at Contemporary Urban Civilization and its Metaphor (2019-12-21 to 2020-04-05)
- DIALOGUES: Oyler Wu Collaborative (2019-07-20 to 2019-11-17)
- HUMAN NATURE: Generosity and Its Form Akihisa HIRATA(2019-03-16 to 2019-06-23)
- The Flying Land (2018-10-06 to 2019-01-20)
- ZERO CITY—Marco Casagrande: Who Cares, Wins the Third Generation City (2018-04-21 to 2018-08-05)
- HOME 2028 (Kaohsiung Museum of Fine Arts) (2018-03-10 to 2018-06-18)
- A Decade: Our Urban Imagination and Adventures (2017-10-21 to 2018-02-25)
- A Nonexistent Place (2017-04-08 to 2017-08-06)
- Home 2025 (2016-10-22 to 2017-01-15)

== Transportation ==
The museum is accessible via Taipei Metro's Zhongxiao Xinsheng and Zhongxiao Fuxing stations.

== See also ==
- List of museums in Taiwan
