= Fanglan Mansion =

Historic house in Da'an, Taipei, Taiwan

- 芳蘭大厝
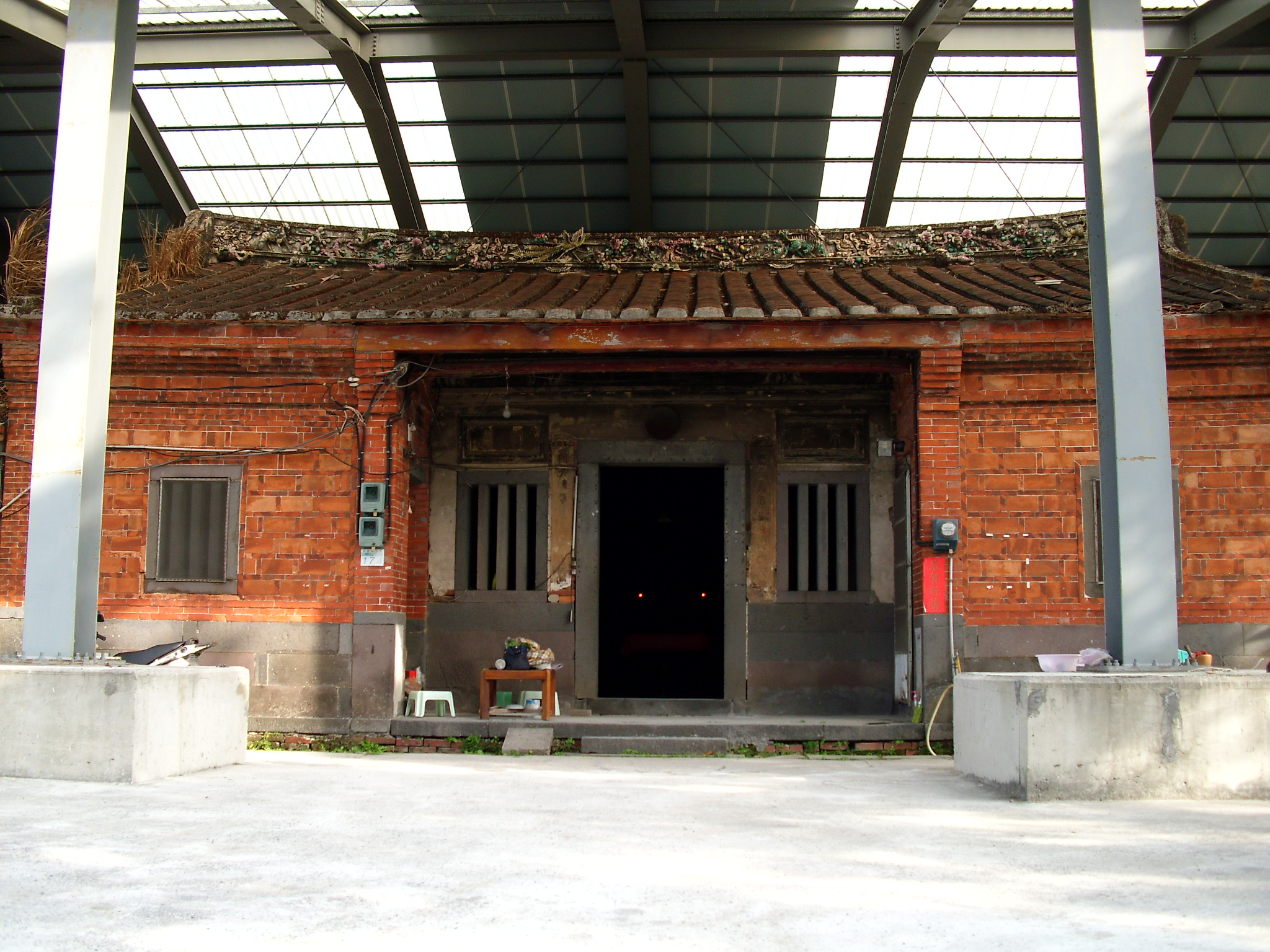
- Interactive map of the Fanglan Mansion area

General information
- Type: former house
- Location: Da'an, Taipei, Taiwan
- Coordinates: 25°00′48.0″N 121°32′52.8″E
- Completed: 1806

The Fanglan Mansion (traditional Chinese: 芳蘭大厝; simplified Chinese: 芳兰大厝; pinyin: Fānglán Dàcuò) is a historical house in Da'an District, Taipei, Taiwan.

== History ==
The mansion was built in 1806 by Chen's family as their first house when they immigrated from Anxi County, Fujian.

== Architecture ==
The mansion was constructed from local stones with fir wood and bricks shipped from Mainland China. A waterwheel attached to one of the exterior walls was decorated with clay moldings. The original layout of the mansion was a traditional three-sectioned structure with left and right wings. Those two wings have since collapsed and no longer exist.

== Transportation ==
The mansion is accessible within walking distance east of Gongguan Station of Taipei Metro.

== See also ==
- List of tourist attractions in Taiwan
