= Wang Yun-wu Memorial Hall =

Memorial hall in Da'an, Taipei, Taiwan

- 王雲五紀念館
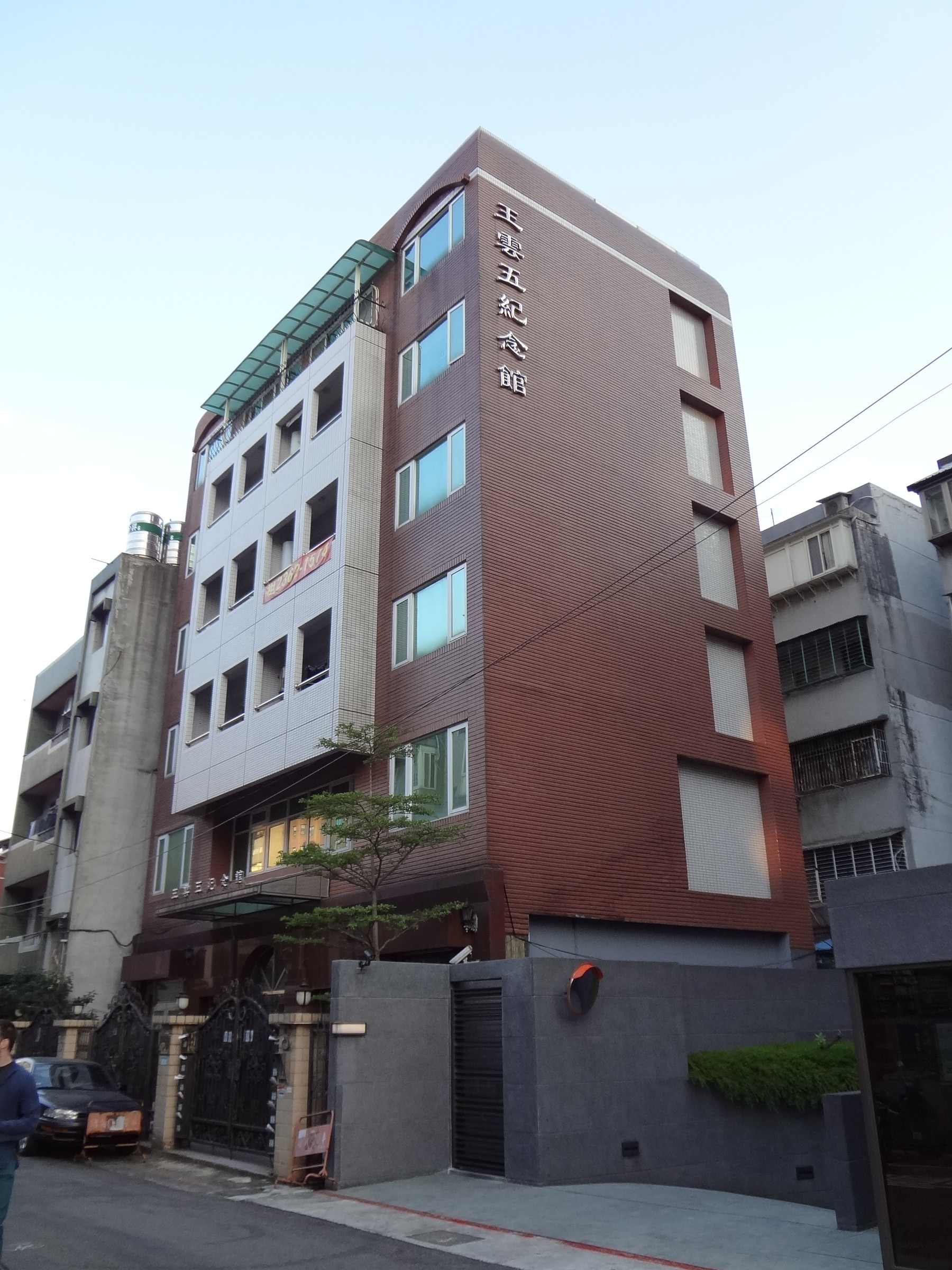
- Interactive map of the Wang Yun-wu Memorial Hall area

General information
- Type: memorial hall
- Location: Da'an, Taipei, Taiwan
- Coordinates: 25°01′29.6″N 121°32′07.6″E

The Wang Yun-wu Memorial Hall (traditional Chinese: 王雲五紀念館; simplified Chinese: 王云五纪念馆; pinyin: Wáng Yúnwǔ Jìniànguǎn) is a memorial hall in Da'an District, Taipei, Taiwan, dedicated to Wang Yun-wu, the former Vice Premier of the Republic of China.

== Transportation ==
The building is accessible within walking distance west from Technology Building Station of Taipei Metro.
