= Daan Park metro station =

Metro station in Taipei, Taiwan

Daan Park 大安森林公園
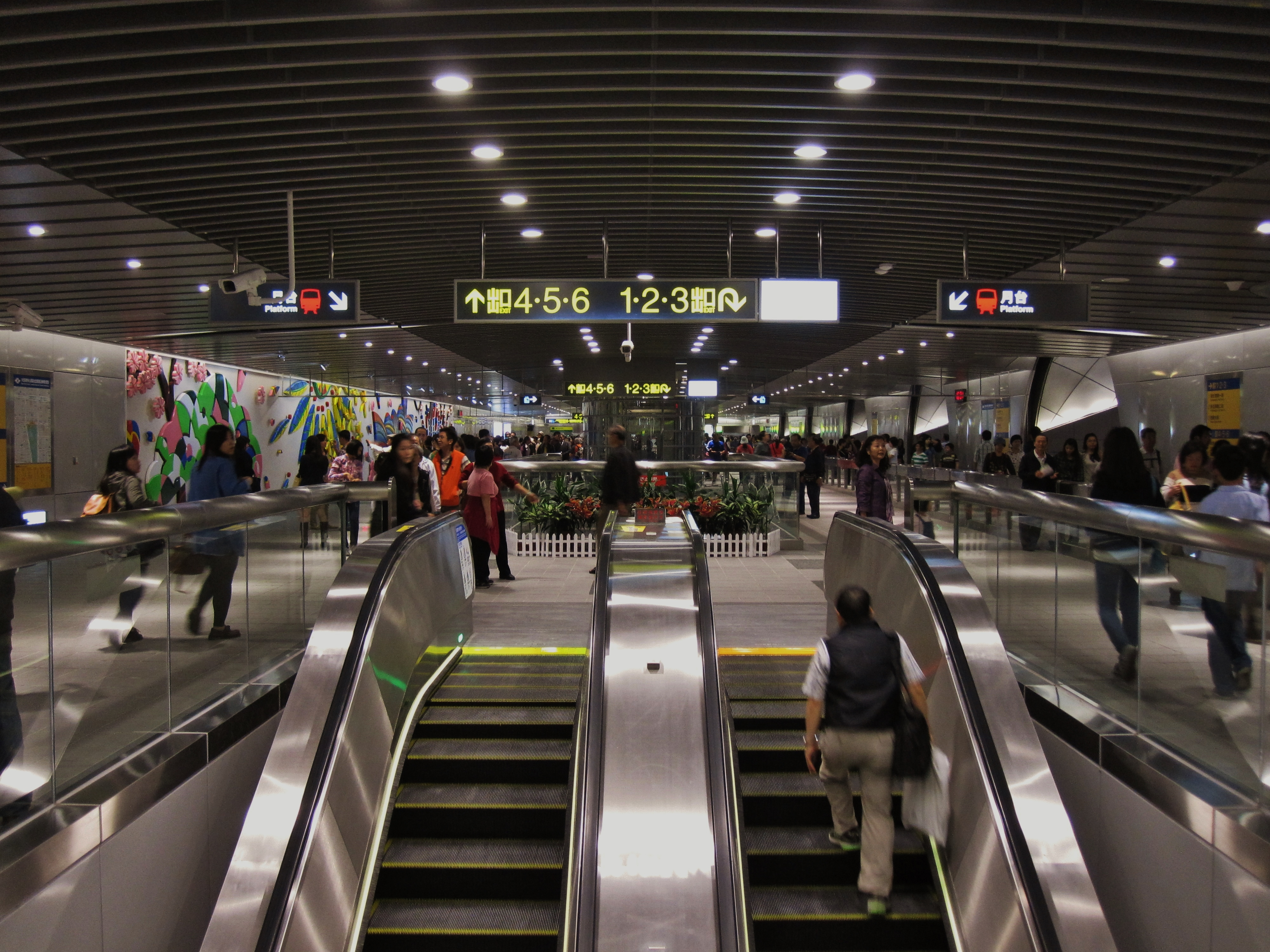
- Station concourse

Chinese name
- Traditional Chinese: 大安森林公園
- Simplified Chinese: 大安森林公园
- Literal meaning: Daan Forest Park
Transcriptions
Standard Mandarin
- Hanyu Pinyin: Dà'ān Sēnlín Gōngyuán
- Wade–Giles: Ta⁴-an¹ Sen¹-lin² Kung¹-yuan²
Hakka
- Pha̍k-fa-sṳ: Thai-ôn Sêm-lìm Kûng-yèn
Southern Min
- Tâi-lô: Tāi-an sim-lîm kong-hn̂g

General information
- Location: Xinyi Rd., Sec. 3 Da'an, Taipei; Taiwan
- Coordinates: 25.0331°N 121.5353°E
- Operator: Taipei Metro
- Line: Tamsui–Xinyi line (R06)

Construction
- Structure type: Underground

Other information
- Station code: R06

History
- Opened: 24 November 2013

Passengers
- daily (December 2024) (Ranked of 119)

Services
Preceding station	Taipei Metro	Following station
Daan towards Xiangshan	Tamsui–Xinyi Line	Dongmen towards Tamsui
Daan Terminus	Tamsui–Xinyi Line	Dongmen towards Beitou
Location

Daan Park station (Chinese: 大安森林公園站) is a metro station on the Tamsui–Xinyi line of Taipei Metro, located beneath Xinyi Rd, Sec. 3 between Xinsheng South Rd. and Jianguo South Rd. in Da'an District, Taipei, Taiwan. It is located at the northern end of the Daan Forest Park, for which it is named. The station was opened on 24 November 2013.

== Station overview ==
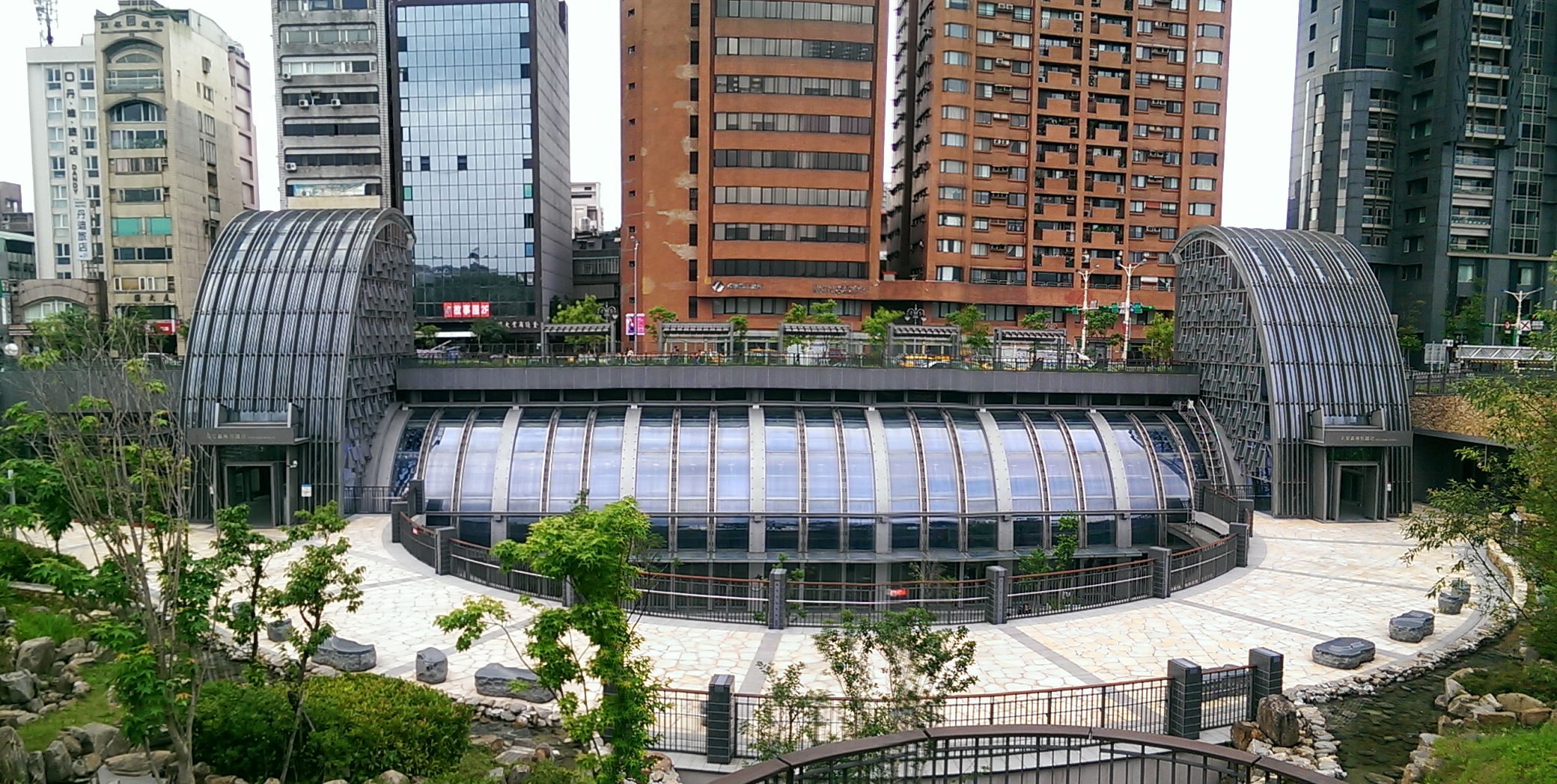
Station exterior

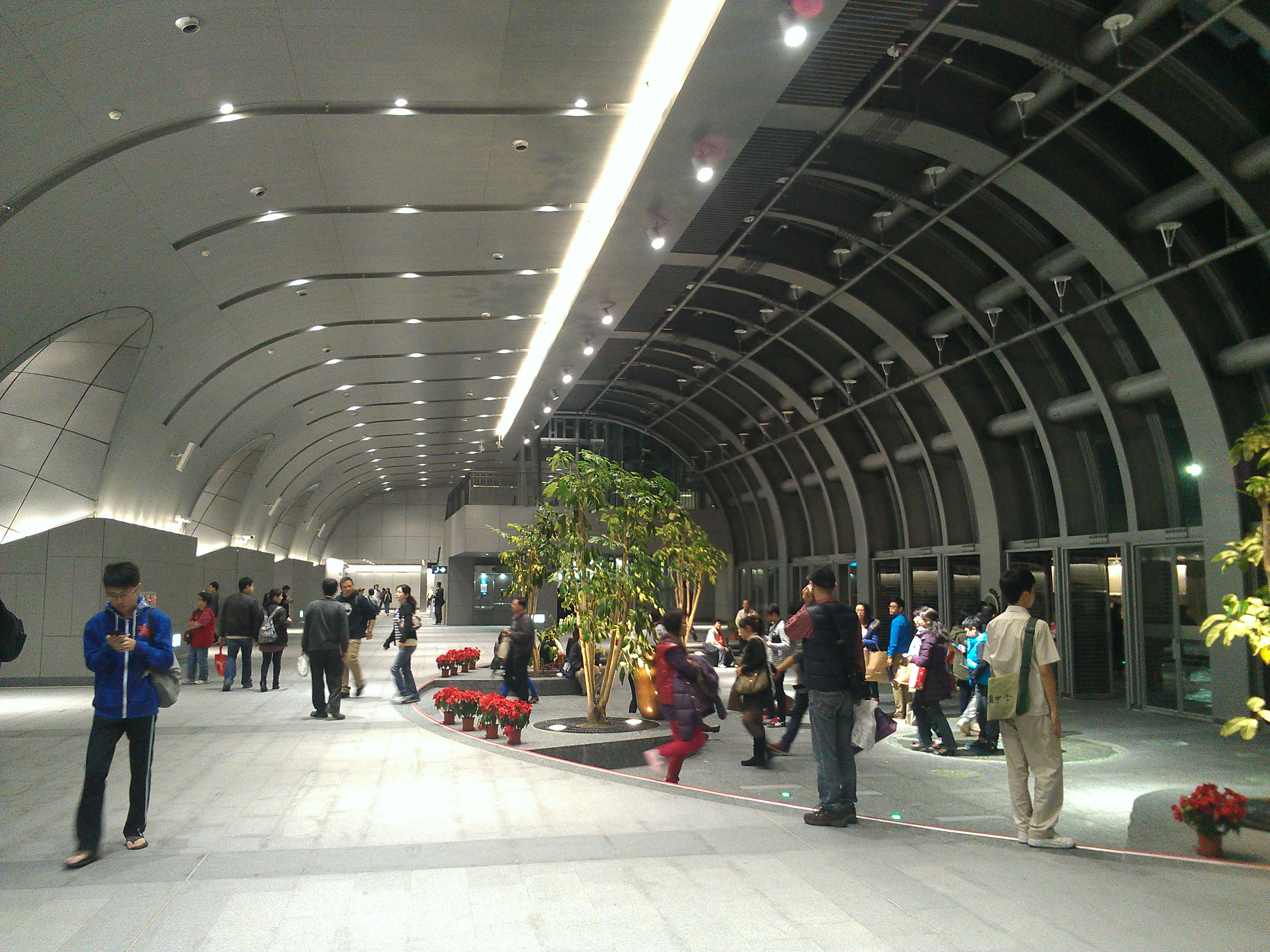
Station lobby at night

The two-level, underground station has an island platform, a naturally-lit hall and a sunken garden. The naturally-lit hall has two light towers and a light hallway. The sunken garden connects to the hall and has a ring-shaped corridor, pond, cascade and circular plaza. The station also has an underground parking lot.

An earlier draft for the station's design did not include the waterfall and sunken, ring-shaped corridor design, though it still maintained the sunken plaza within the station lobby.

=== Construction ===
The station is 226 m (741 ft) long and 22 m (72 ft) wide and excavated to a depth of 19 m (62 ft). It has six entrances, three elevators for the disabled and two vent shafts. One of the entrances is integrated into a joint development building. The 34-story building is incorporated into exit D and was completed in December 2010. Due to station construction, old banyan trees originally planted on the sidewalk along Xinyi Road were replanted elsewhere within the park.

=== Design ===
The design theme for the station is "Forest Revolution: the City and Park Conversing".

== Station layout ==
Street level	Entrance/exit	Entrance/exit
B1	Scenic concourse	Lobby, information desk, automatic ticketing dispensing machines, one-way faregates Sunlight hall, sunken garden Restrooms (inside fare zone, outside fare zone near exit 6)
B2	Platform 1	← Tamsui–Xinyi line toward Tamsui / Beitou (R07 Dongmen)
B2	Island platform, doors will open on the left
B2	Platform 2	→ Tamsui–Xinyi line toward Xiangshan / Daan (R05 Daan) →

== First and last train timings ==
The first and last train timings at Daan Park station are as follows:

Destination	First train		Last train
Destination	Mon − Fri	Sat − Sun and P.H.	Daily
Tamsui–Xinyi line
R28 Tamsui	06:01	06:01	00:26
R01guangci/fengtian palace station	06:08	06:08	01:08

== Around the station ==
- Daan Forest Park
- Taipei Grand Mosque
