= Workshop of Advanced Academy of Agronomy and Forestry =

Former laboratory in Da'an, Taipei, Taiwan

- 臺灣蓬萊米的誕生地
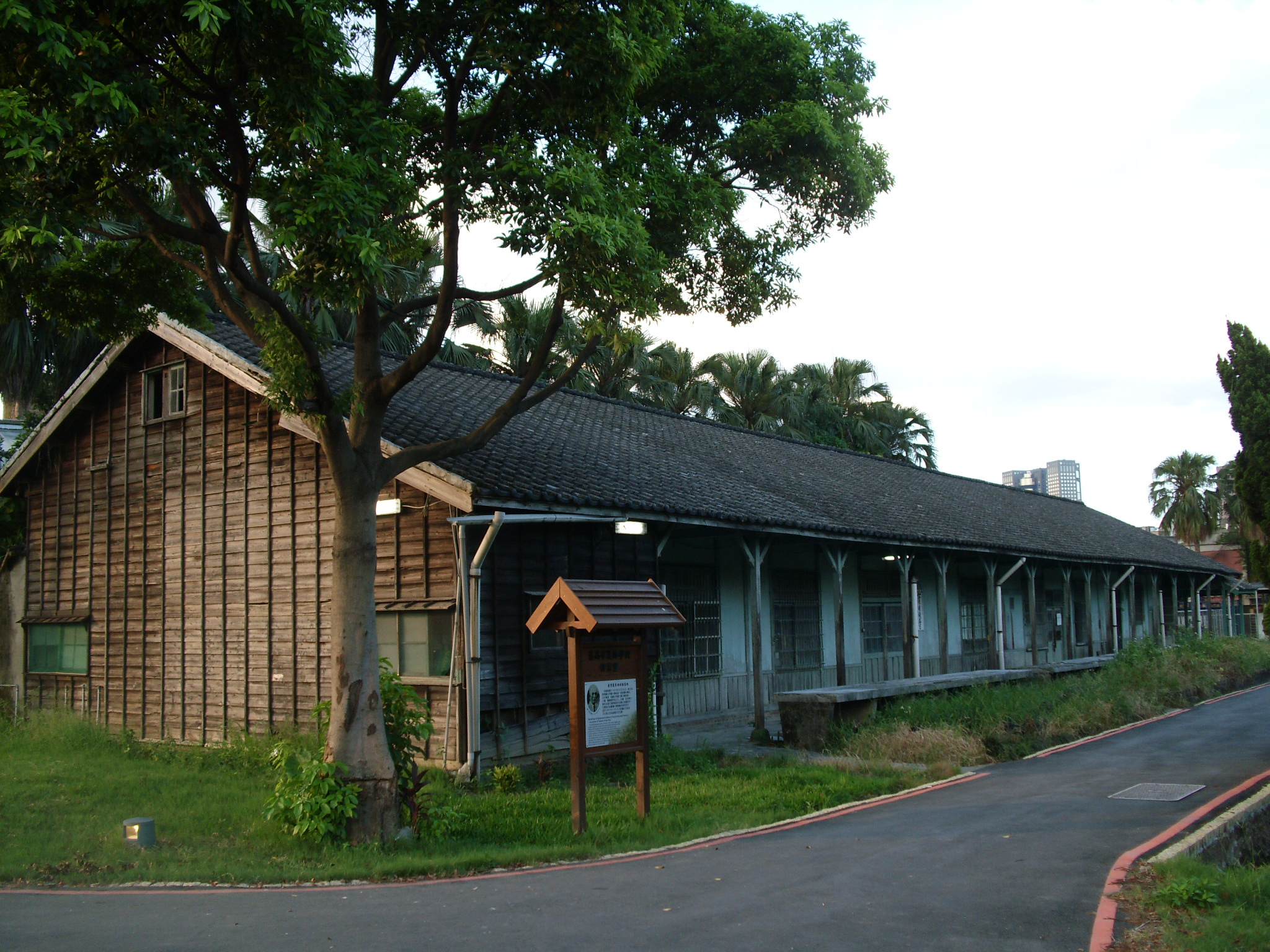
- Established: 28 February 1925
- Research type: former laboratory
- Location: Da'an, Taipei, Taiwan; 25°00′57.2″N 121°32′28.1″E
- Affiliations: National Taiwan University

The Workshop of Advanced Academy of Agronomy and Forestry (traditional Chinese: 臺灣蓬萊米的誕生地; simplified Chinese: 台湾蓬莱米的诞生地; pinyin: Táiwān Péngláimǐ De Dànshēngdì) is a historical laboratory at National Taiwan University (NTU) in Da'an District, Taipei, Taiwan.

== Name ==
The house building has been nicknamed Iso House by NTU faculty and students.

== History ==
The building was originally completed on 28 February 1925 during the Japanese rule of Taiwan. It was the workshop for the Advanced Academy of Agronomy and Forestry. The building was designated as a municipal historic site by the Department of Cultural Affairs of the Taipei City Government on 28 July 2009.

== Architecture ==
The building is a wooden Japanese-style bungalow with an area of 397 m^{2}.

== Transportation ==
The building is accessible within walking distance east of Gongguan Station of Taipei Metro.

== See also ==
- List of tourist attractions in Taiwan
