= Daan District, Taipei =

District of Taipei, Taiwan

Coordinates: 25°1′35″N 121°32′4″E

Daan 大安區 Da-an; Da'an; Taan; Ta-an
- District
- Daan District
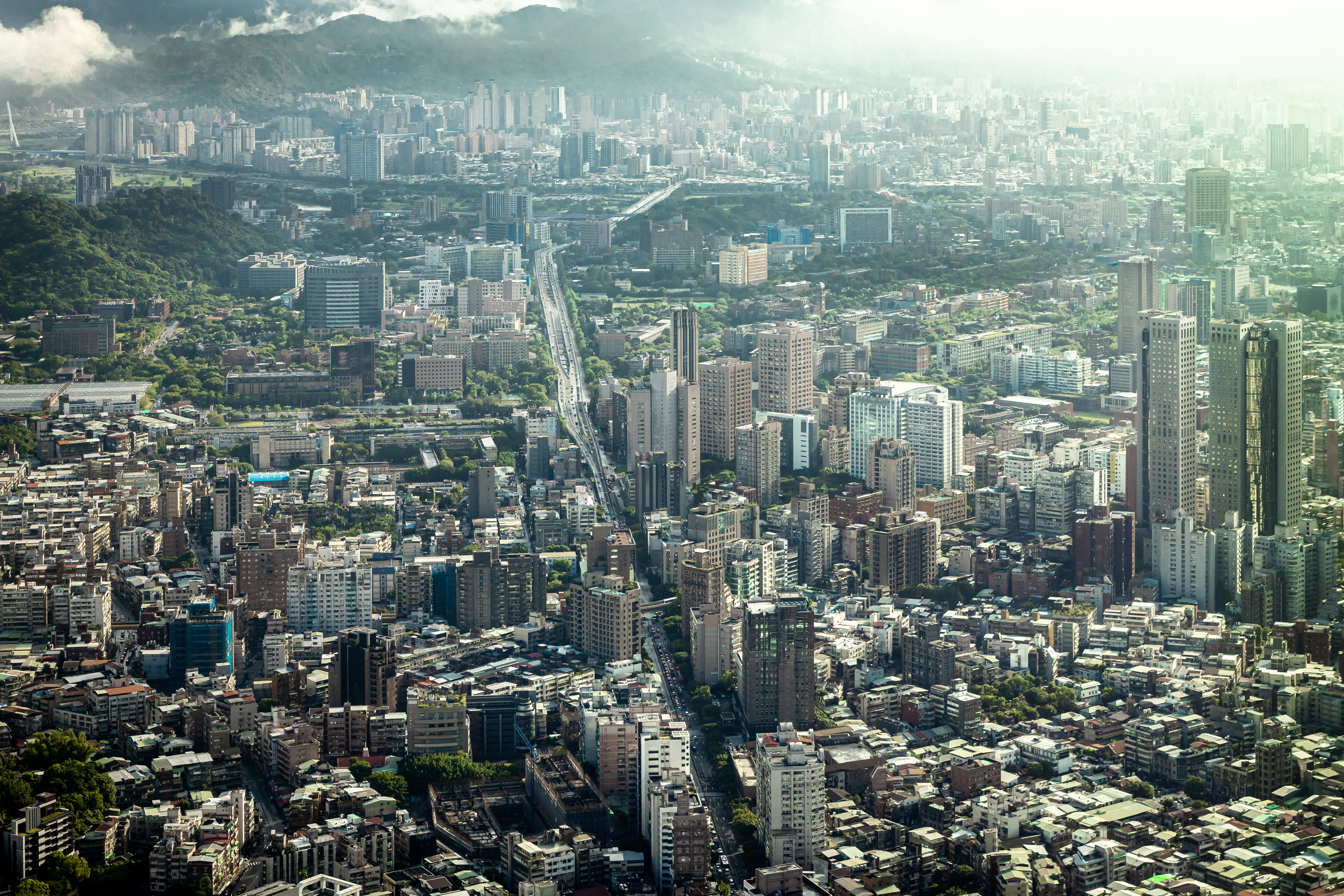
- Cityscape of Daan District

- DAAN 臺北市大安區公所; Daan District Office, Taipei City

- Country: Republic of China (Taiwan)
- Region: Western Taipei
- Divisions: List: 53 villages; 1027 neighborhoods

Area
  - Total: 11.3614 km^{2} (4.3867 sq mi)
  - Rank: Ranked 7th of 12

Population (January 2023)
  - Total: 285,933
  - Rank: Ranked 1st of 12
  - Density: 25,167.1/km^{2} (65,182.4/sq mi)
- Postal code: 106
- Website: Official website

Daan District, Taipei
- Traditional Chinese: 大安區
- Simplified Chinese: 大安区
Transcriptions
Standard Mandarin
- Hanyu Pinyin: Dà'ān Qū
- Wade–Giles: Ta-an Ch'ü
- Tongyong Pinyin: Dà-an Cyu
Southern Min
- Hokkien POJ: Tāi-an-khu

Da'anzhuang (old name)
- Traditional Chinese: 大安莊
- Simplified Chinese: 大安庄
Transcriptions
Southern Min
- Hokkien POJ: Tāi-an-chng

Daan District (or Da-an District, Da'an District) is an important political, educational, commercial, residential and cultural district of Taipei, Taiwan. The name of the district means "great safety" or "great peace". Located in Northern Taiwan, it is known for having one of the highest real estate prices in Taipei and Asia in general.

== History ==
The district is named after Daiwan village (Chinese: 大灣; Pe̍h-ōe-jī: Tāi-ôan) that was once located near the intersection of present-day Xinyi Road and Fuxing S. Road. The name was changed in the 1800s (during the Qing era) to the more auspicious but similar-sounding "Daan" (大安; pinyin: Dà'ān; Pe̍h-ōe-jī: Tāi-an; lit. 'great peace').

In 1875, the setup of Taipei Prefecture put the village together with 下內埔 and La̍k-tiuⁿ-lê (六張犁), all of which are within today's Daan District. During the Japanese occupation of Taiwan, Daan village was merged with Nishikichō (錦町), Fukuzumichō (福住町), and Shōwachō (昭和町).

In 1945, after World War II, after the island of Taiwan was ceded to the Republic of China and under the current rule by the Chinese Nationalists, the boundaries of Daan District were delineated around Daan village, from which it derived its name. Subsequent notable alterations occurred during the 1990s, shaping the district's configuration further.

== Geography ==
Daan is bounded on the east by Guangfu South Road, Keelung Road and Heping East Road; on the south by Neipu, Fuzhou and Toad Hills, and the Xinhai and Zhuangjing Tunnels; in the west by Roosevelt Road, Hangzhou South Road, Xinyi Road and Xinsheng South Road; and in the north by Civic Boulevard. The district is bordered by Xinyi District to the east, Wenshan District to the south, Zhongzheng District to the west, Zhongshan District to the northwest, and Songshan District to the northeast.

== Government institutions ==
- Industrial Development Bureau
- Maritime and Port Bureau
- Ministry of Science and Technology
- Securities and Futures Bureau
- Small and Medium Enterprise Administration
- Taiwan Intellectual Property Office
- Transitional Justice Commission

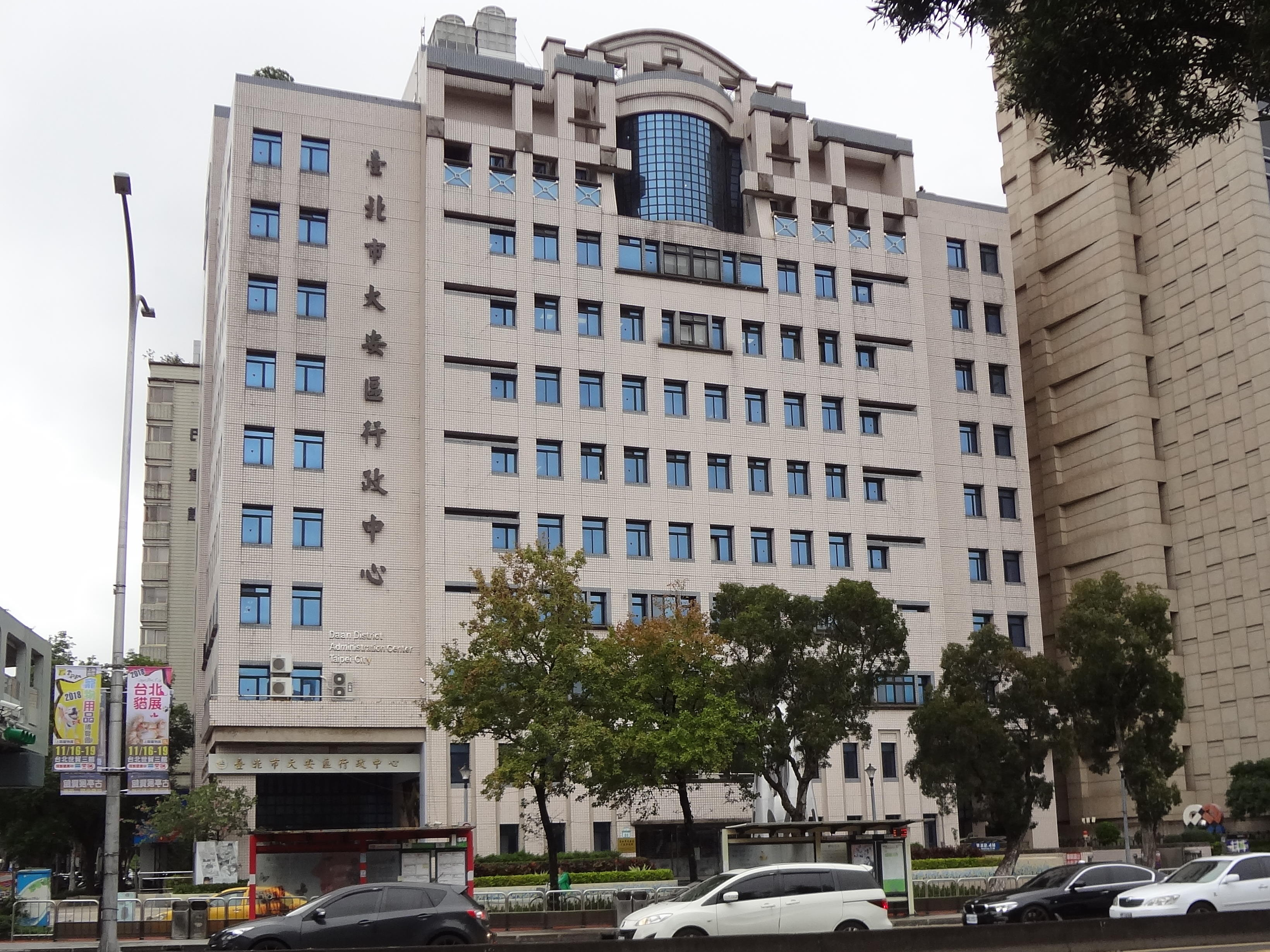
Daan District Administration Center, Taipei City

== Education ==
Daan hosts three major national universities, contributing significantly to the educational landscape of the area. These universities serve as important centers for academic excellence, research, and intellectual development within the community: National Taiwan University (NTU), National Taiwan University of Science and Technology and National Taiwan Normal University (NTNU). The former two universities have strong engineering programs, NTNU has excellent research in the humanities and social sciences, and NTU also has a highly regarded medical school located in the Zhongzheng District.

The National Taipei University of Technology, National Taipei University of Education and Affiliated Senior High School of National Taiwan Normal University are also in this district.

For learners of Chinese as a foreign language, Daan hosts a number of popular language centers including the Taiwan Mandarin Institute (TMI), NTU's International Chinese Language Program and NTNU's Mandarin Training Center.

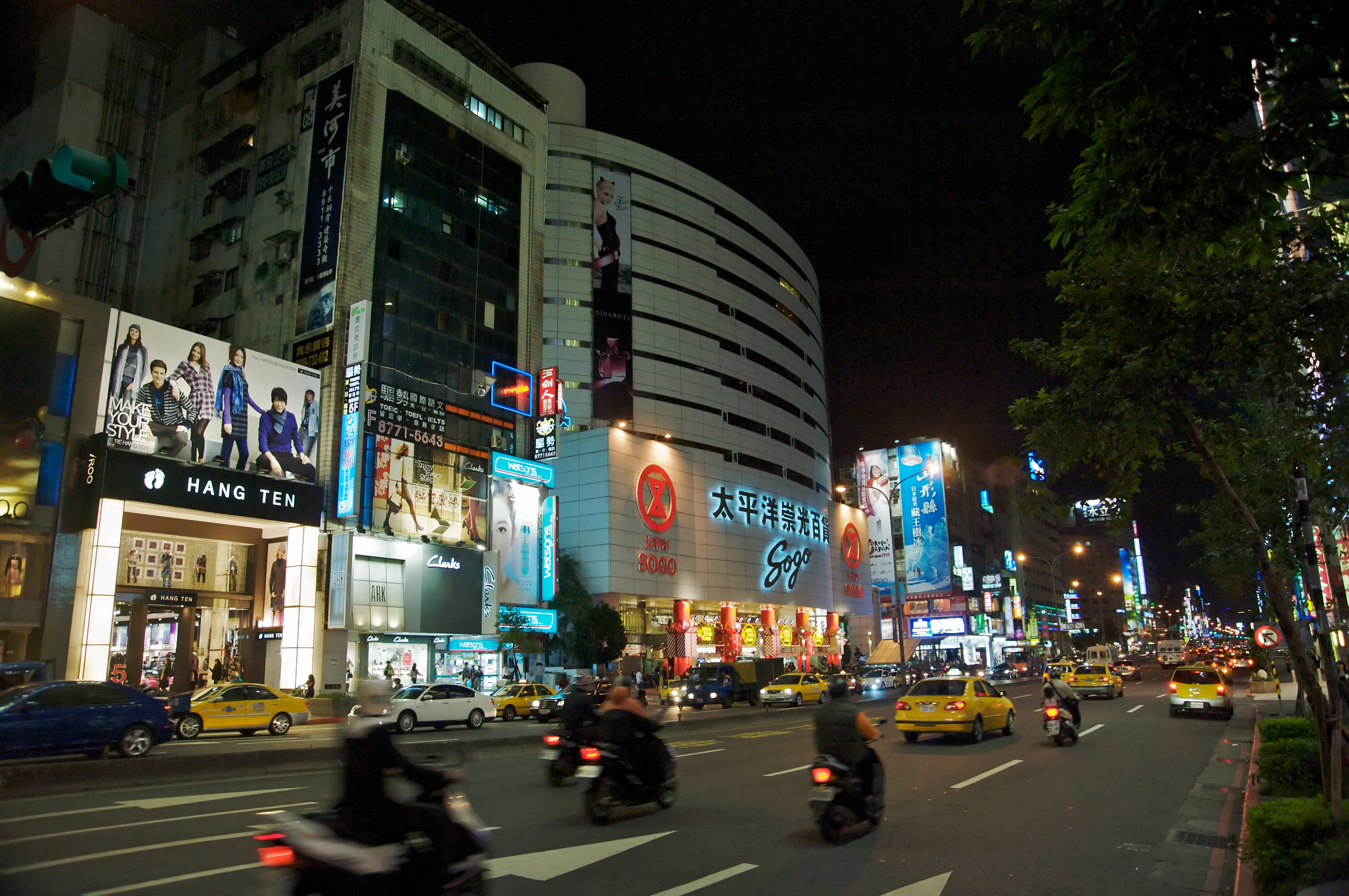
Zhongxiao Road, a major commercial street in the district

== Residential ==
Daan is renowned for hosting some of the most coveted residential real estate in Asia, featuring properties that command premium prices clustered around the tree-lined Dunhua South, Anhe and Renai Road areas (known as the East District). As of 2009, Guangfu Road had the highest residential land value. In this area there are upscale fashion boutiques, elite retail shops and many of Taipei's renowned "lounge bars". A study conducted in 2020 by the Department of Land Administration found that among the 12 administrative districts in Taipei City, Daan District came out on top with an average price of NT$38.21 million per apartment, or approximately $1.2 million US dollars.

== Other places of interest ==
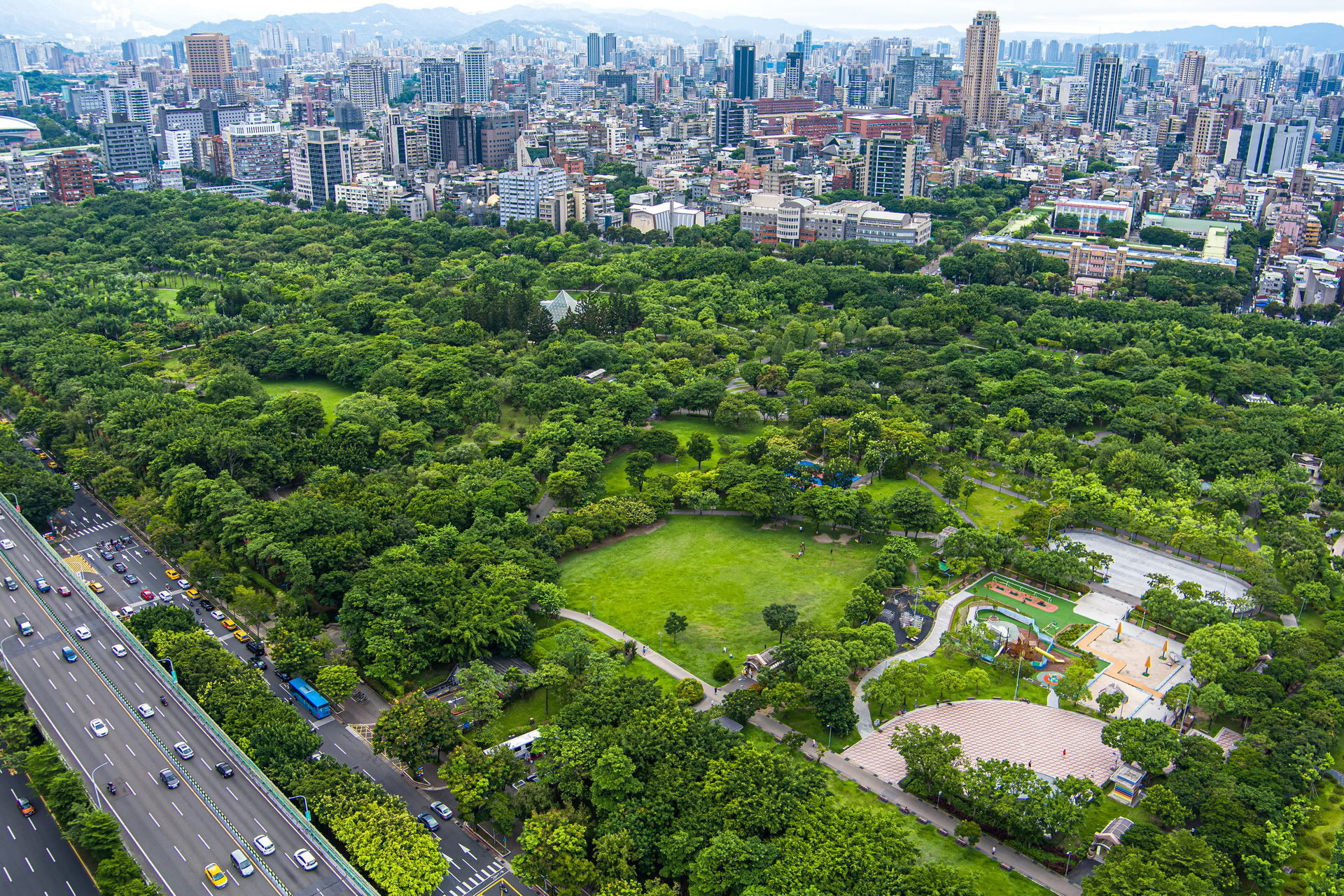
An aerial view of Daan Forest Park

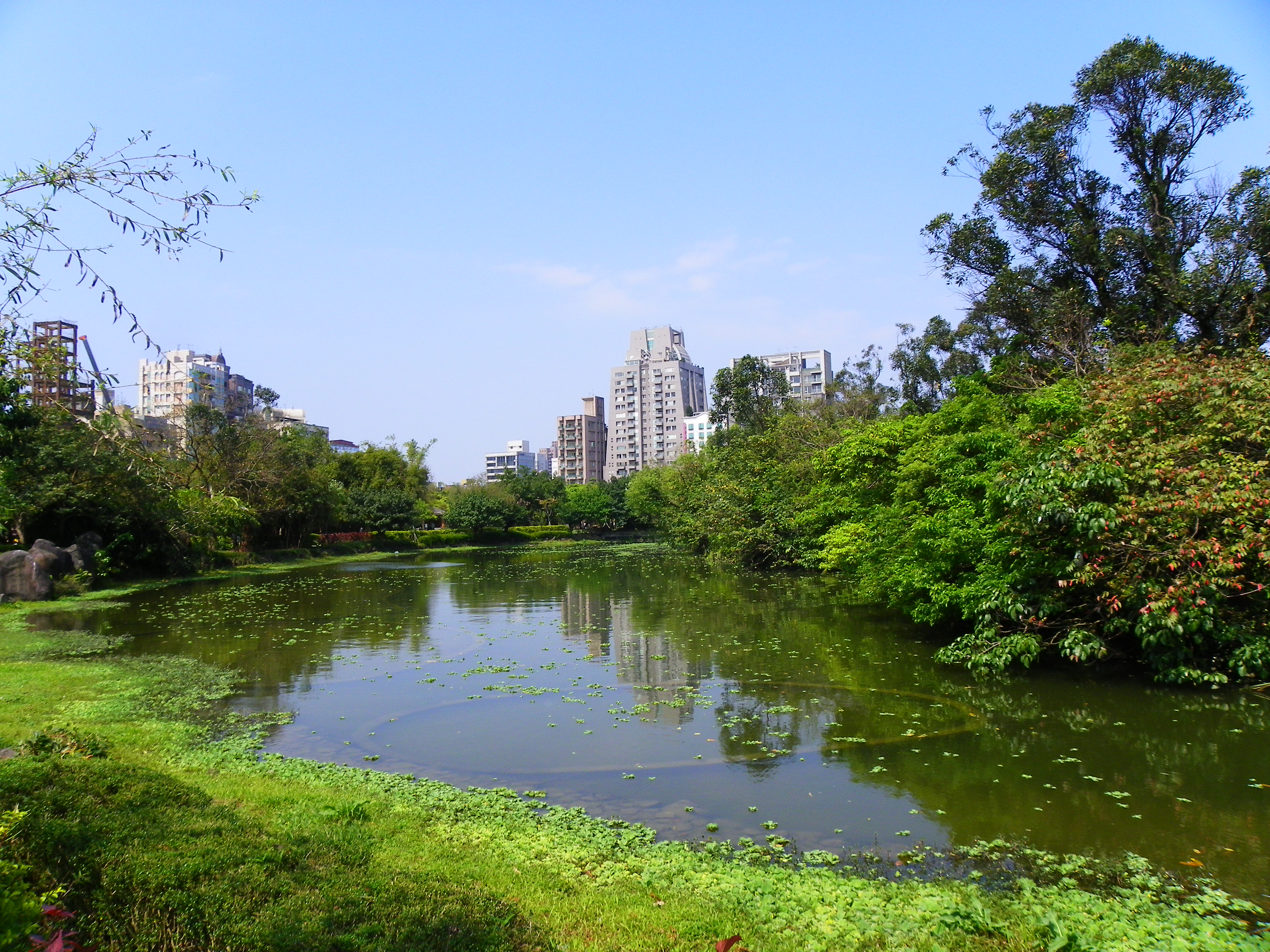
Daan Forest Park is a large public park in the area

Other notable places include the Daan Forest Park, which was built on land formerly occupied by military officers and their families, and the Taipei Municipal Library. The park occupies an area of 26 hectares and includes an amphitheater, concrete roller- and inline-skating rink, ponds, pavilions, paths, and two underground parking lots. The park also has a popular playground for children. Daan Forest Park was intended to play a similar role as other major city parks such as New York City's Central Park and London's Hyde Park, acting as the "lungs of Taipei city" and as respite for residents from the bustle of life in Taipei. Similar to the large parks of other cities, Daan Park is surrounded by high price luxury condominiums that fetch a premium due to their desirable views, some reaching the price of $400 million New Taiwan dollars (approximately $14 million US dollars) in 2012.

The Mongolian and Tibetan Cultural Center, Workshop of Advanced Academy of Agronomy and Forestry, Jut Art Museum, Taiwan Contemporary Culture Lab, Taipei Hakka Culture Hall, Wistaria Tea House, Mind Set Art Center, Nanmen Market, Wang Yun-wu Memorial Hall, and Fanglan Mansion, and many other tourist attractions are also located in Daan District. Museums in Daan District are Museum of Archives, Museum of National Taipei University of Education and Museum of Zoology.

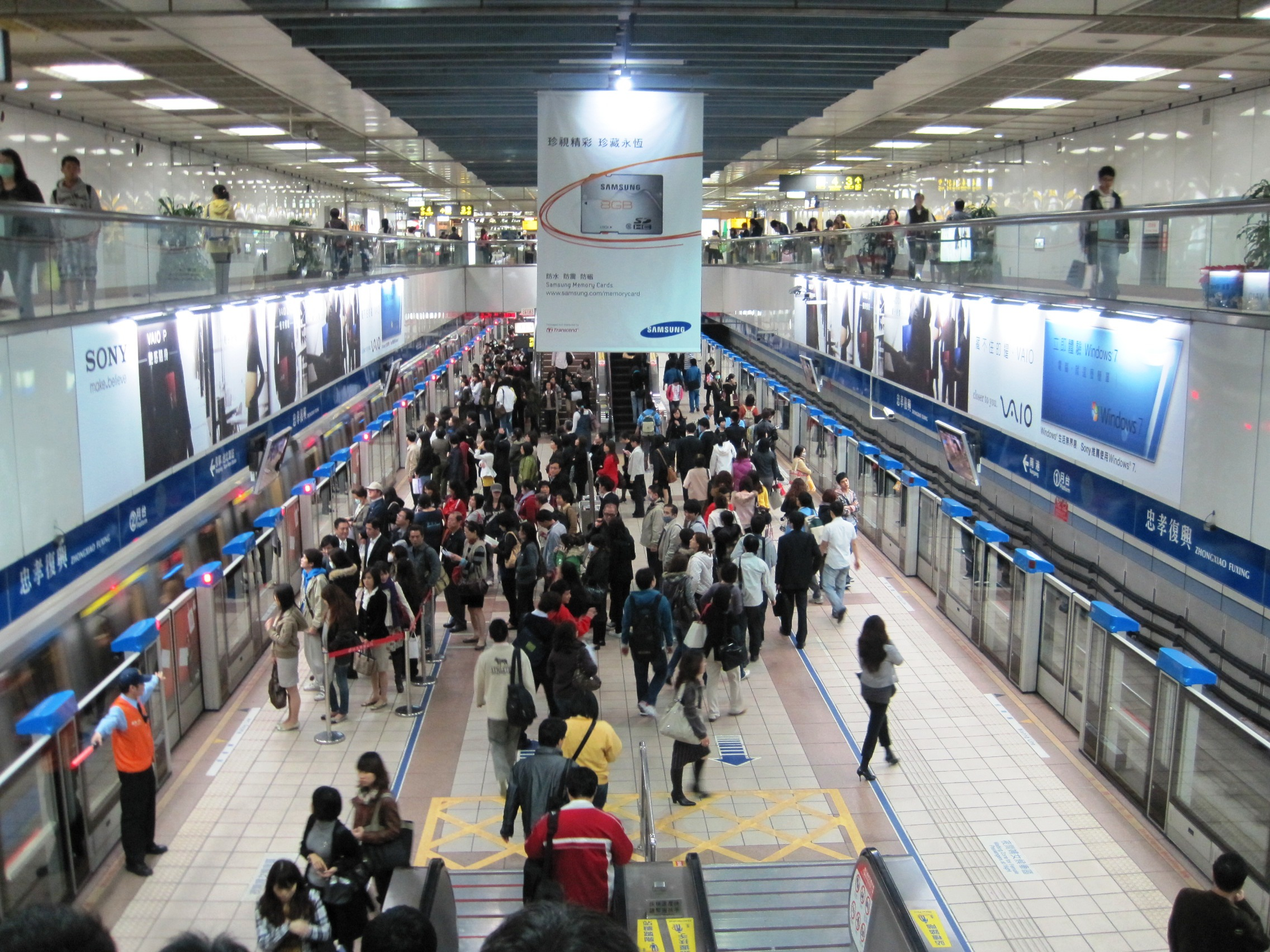
Zhongxiao Fuxing Station platform

== Transportation ==
Daan is served by the Taipei Mass Rapid Transit, otherwise known as the Taipei Metro. The Wenhu line, Bannan line, Songshan-Xindian line, Tamsui-Xinyi line, and Zhonghe-Xinlu line all have stations in the district.

A total of fourteen stations are located in the district: Sun Yat-Sen Memorial Hall, Zhongxiao Dunhua, Zhongxiao Fuxing, Zhongxiao Xinsheng, Daan Park, Daan, Xinyi Anhe, Technology Building, Liuzhangli, Linguang, Dongmen, Chiang Kai-shek Memorial Hall, Guting, Taipower Building and Gongguan.

== Notable people ==
- Jolin Tsai (born 1980), Taiwanese singer-songwriter
- Jay Chou (born 1979) Mandopop singer and musician
- JJ Lin (born 1981) Singaporean singer-songwriter
- Dee Hsu (born 1978), Taiwanese singer, actress, and television host
