= Dongmen metro station =

Metro station in Taipei, Taiwan

Dongmen / 東門
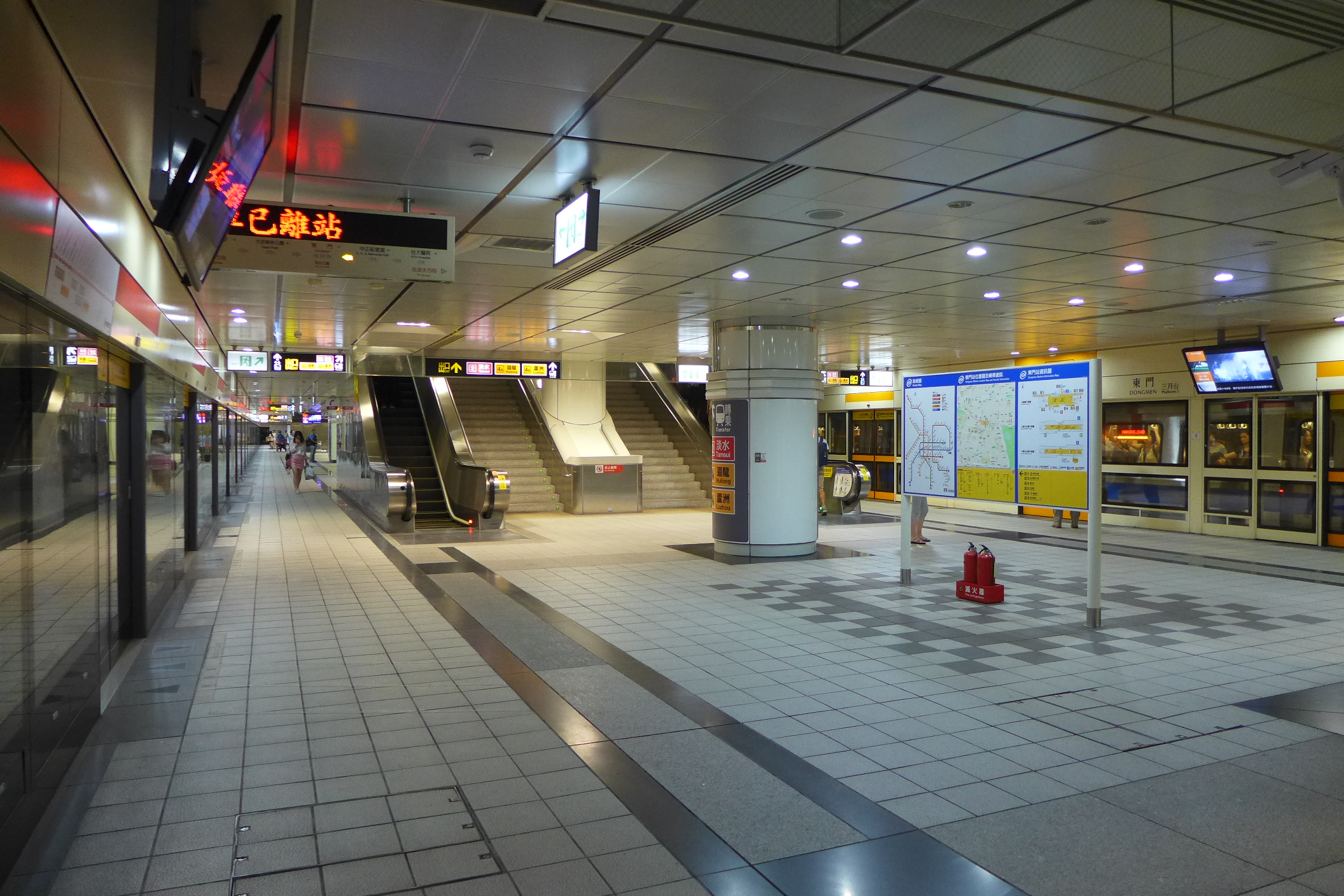
- Platform level of Dongmen station, showing the cross platform transfer

Chinese name
- Traditional Chinese: 東門
- Simplified Chinese: 东门
- Literal meaning: East Gate
Transcriptions
Standard Mandarin
- Hanyu Pinyin: Dōngmén
- Bopomofo: ㄉㄨㄥ ㄇㄣˊ
- Wade–Giles: Tung¹-men²
Hakka
- Pha̍k-fa-sṳ: Tûng-mùn
Southern Min
- Tâi-lô: Tang-mn̂g

General information
- Location: B1F 166 Sec 2 Xinyi Rd; Zhongzheng and Da'an, Taipei; Taiwan
- Coordinates: 25.0339°N 121.5285°E
- System: Taipei metro station
- Lines: Zhonghe–Xinlu line Tamsui–Xinyi line

Construction
- Structure type: Underground
- Cycle facilities: Access available

Other information
- Station code: ,
- Website: web.metro.taipei/e/stationdetail2010.asp?ID=R07+O06-134

History
- Opened: 30 September 2012

Key dates
- 24 November 2013: Tamsui–Xinyi line added

Passengers
- 2017: 17.756 million per year ▲0.17%
- Rank: (Ranked 29 of 119)

Services
Preceding station	Taipei Metro	Following station
Daan Park towards Xiangshan or Daan	Tamsui–Xinyi line	CKS Memorial Hall towards Tamsui or Beitou
Guting towards Nanshijiao	Zhonghe–Xinlu line	Zhongxiao Xinsheng towards Huilong or Luzhou
Location

Dongmen (Chinese: 東門) is a metro station in Taipei, Taiwan served by the Taipei Metro. It is an interchange station with the Tamsui–Xinyi line and the Zhonghe–Xinlu line, which opened on 24 November 2013. The station opened on 30 September 2012 with the opening of the Zhongxiao Xinsheng to Guting segment of the Zhonghe–Xinlu line.

== Station overview ==
This is a four-level, underground station with island platforms for both the Tamsui–Xinyi and Zhonghe–Xinlu Lines. The platforms are stacked, allowing for cross-platform interchange between the two lines. The Xinyi Line station is 217 m (712 ft) meters long and 24.7 m (81 ft) meters wide. and eight exits, one accessible elevator, and two vent shafts.

== Construction ==
The main diaphragm wall of the station is 1.5 m (4.9 ft) thick and 72 m (236 ft) meters deep, thus making it the deepest diaphragm wall of all Taipei Metro stations. Construction on this part started in March 2004 and was completed on 26 April 2007. It was announced that on 15 July 2010, the intersection of Jinshan South Road and Xinyi Road would be restored to its pre-construction state.

=== Tunnels ===
Because the station is the interchange station of the Xinyi and Xinzhuang Lines, five tunnels intersect in a twisted form beneath the nearby Hangzhou South Road: two Xinyi Line tunnels, two Xinzhuang Line tunnels, and a common duct. They are stacked and intersected underneath existing buildings and run along Sec 2, Hangzhou South Rd. Construction on the five tunnels began on 15 September 2005 with the start of construction on the Red Line and was completed by 17 January 2009. Of the subway tunnels, the shallowest is the northbound Xinzhuang Line tunnel at 13.4 m (44 ft) deep, while the deepest is the Xinyi Line southbound tunnel at 25.3 m (83 ft) deep. The common duct, by far the shallowest of the five, is 7–8 m (23–26 ft) underground.

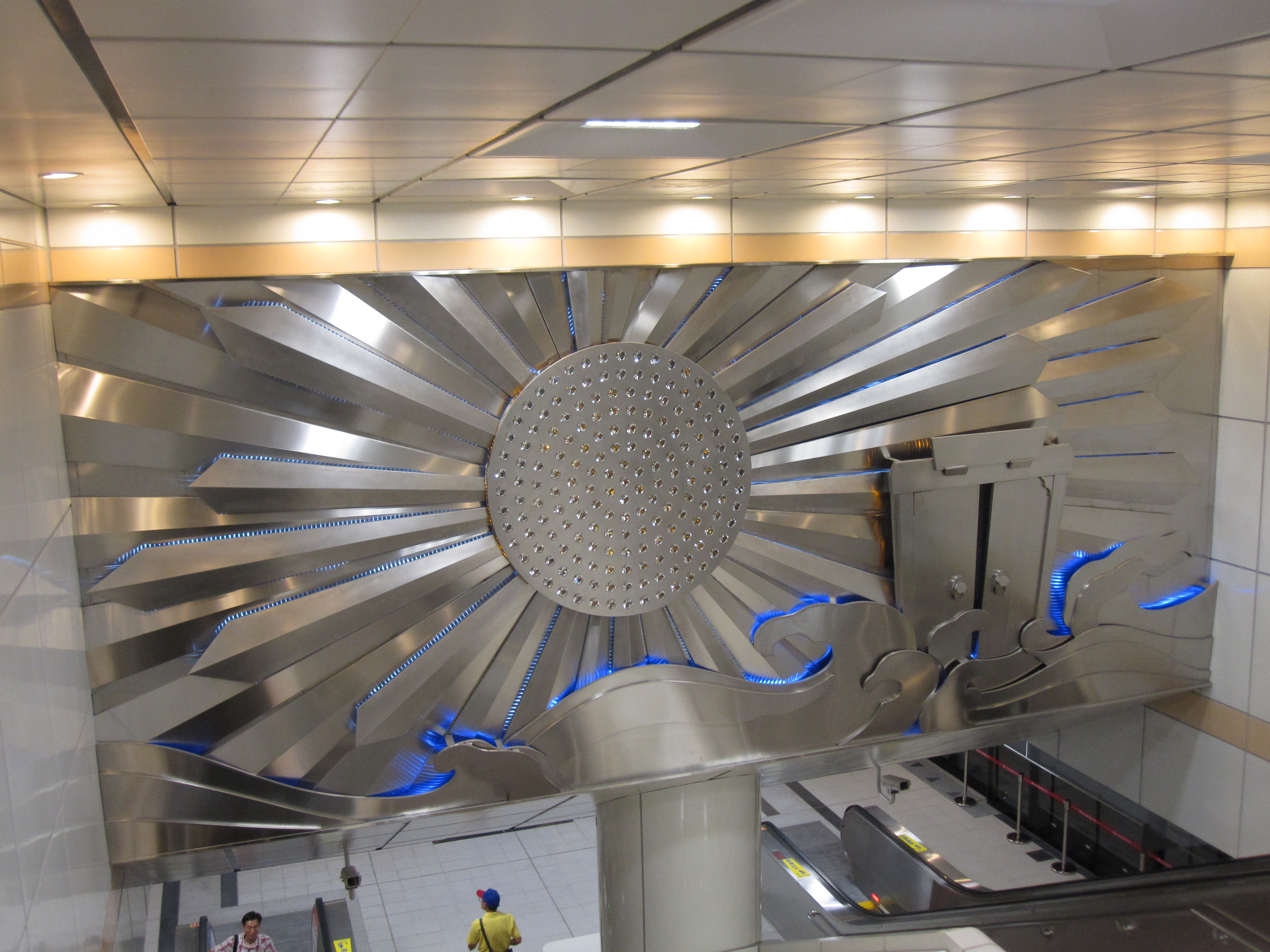
Public art

== Station layout ==
Street level	Street level	Exit/entrance
B1	Concourse	Lobby, toilets, one-way ticket machine, information desk
B2	Platform 1	→ Zhonghe–Xinlu line toward Luzhou / Huilong (O07 Zhongxiao Xinsheng) →
B2	Island platform, doors will open on the right
B2	Platform 2	← Tamsui–Xinyi line toward Tamsui / Beitou (R08 Chiang Kai-shek Memorial Hall)
B4	Platform 3	← Zhonghe–Xinlu line toward Nanshijiao (O05 Guting)
B4	Island platform, doors will open on the left
B4	Platform 4	→ Tamsui–Xinyi line toward Guangci/Fengtian Temple / Daan (R06 Daan Park) →

== Around the station ==
- Dongmen Market
