= Daan metro station =

Metro station in Taipei, Taiwan

Daan / 大安
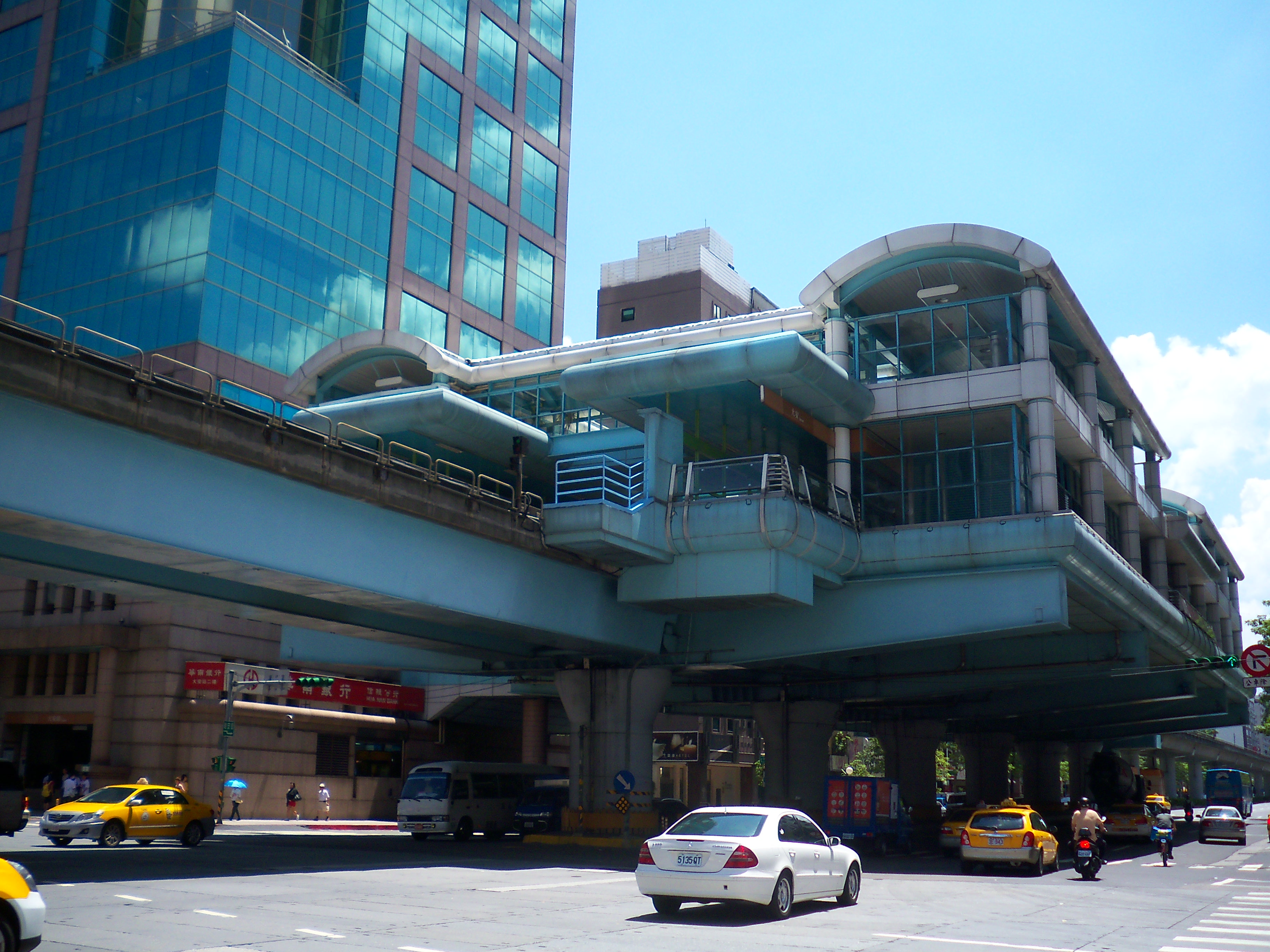
- Exterior

Chinese name
- Chinese: 大安
Transcriptions
Standard Mandarin
- Hanyu Pinyin: Dà'ān
- Bopomofo: ㄉㄚˋ ㄢ
Hakka
- Pha̍k-fa-sṳ: Thai-ôn
Southern Min
- Hokkien POJ: Tāi-an

General information
- Location: 2 Sec 4 Xinyi Rd; Da’an, Taipei (BR); Taiwan
- Coordinates: 25.0330°N 121.5436°E
- System: Taipei metro station
- Lines: Wenhu line Tamsui–Xinyi line

Construction
- Structure type: Elevated (BR); Underground (R)
- Cycle facilities: Access available

Other information
- Station code: ,
- Website: web.metro.taipei/e/stationdetail2010.asp?ID=R05+BR09-011

History
- Opened: 28 March 1996; 30 years ago (Wenhu Line) 24 November 2013; 12 years ago (Tamsui-Xinyi Line)
- Former names: Ta'An (until 2003)

Passengers
- 2017: 16.465 million per year ▲3.9%
- Rank: (Ranked 33 of 119)

Services
Preceding station	Taipei Metro	Following station
Technology Building towards Taipei Zoo	Wenhu line	Zhongxiao Fuxing towards Nangang Exhib Center
Xinyi Anhe towards Guangci/Fengtian Temple	Tamsui–Xinyi line	Daan Park towards Tamsui
Terminus	Tamsui–Xinyi line	Daan Park towards Beitou
Location

Daan (Chinese: 大安; pinyin: Dà'ān, which has a misleading romanization since its 2003 renaming from Ta'An) is a metro station in Taipei, Taiwan served by Taipei Metro. It is a transfer station between the Wenhu line and Tamsui–Xinyi line. It is a terminus of short turn services on the Tamsui–Xinyi line.

== Station overview ==
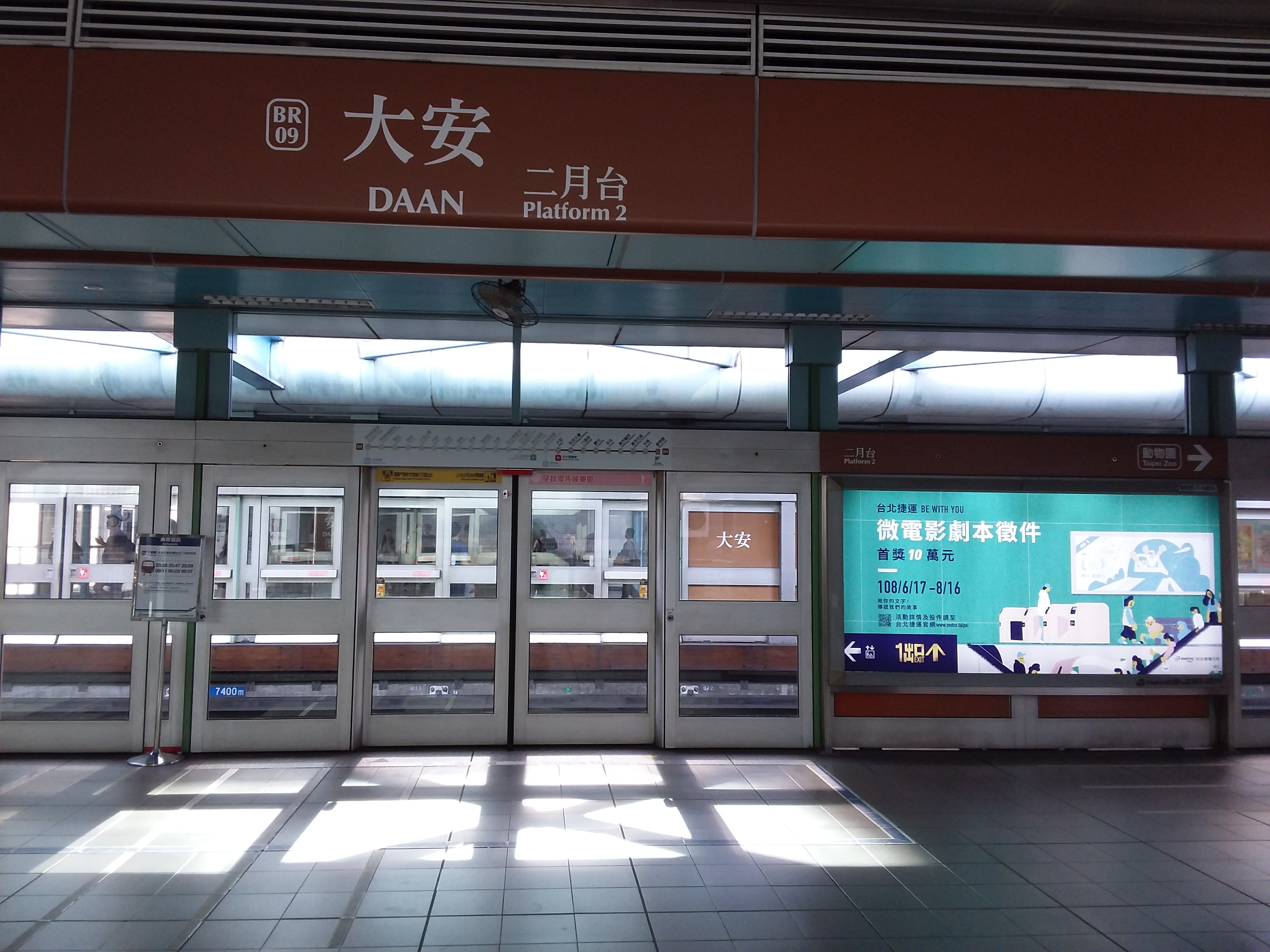
Brown Line platform

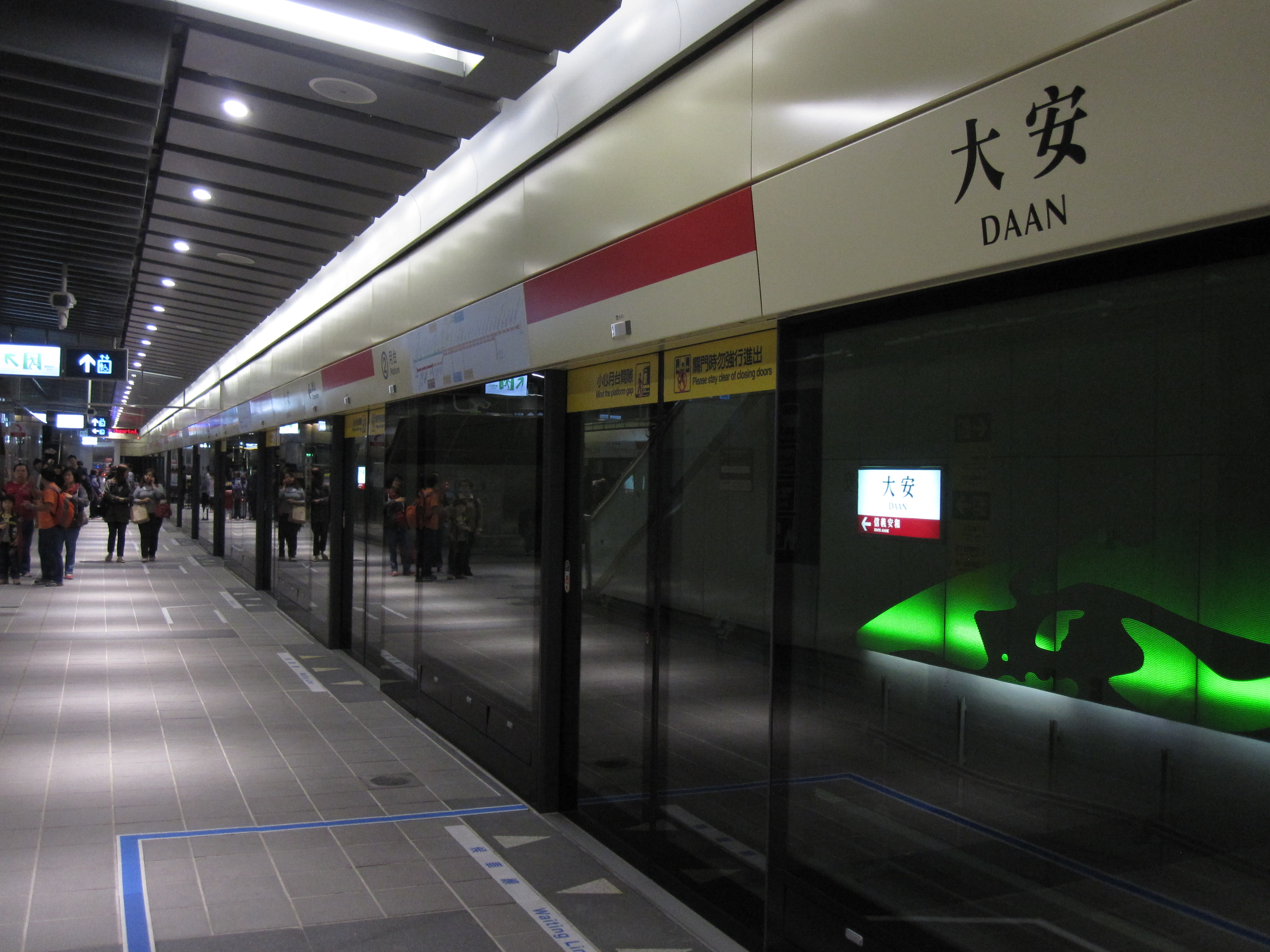
Red Line platform

This is a five-level, elevated and underground station and has two side platforms, an island platform and six exits. It is located at the intersection of Fuxing South Rd. and Xinyi Rd. Four more exits have been constructed with the opening of the Red Line. Red Line trains from Beitou terminate here during non-rush hours.

=== Construction ===
The Red Line station is 347 m (1,138 ft) long and 25 m (82 ft) wide. Excavation depth is at 25 m (82 ft). It also has a 319 m (1,047 ft) pocket track, four entrances, two accessibility elevators, and three vent shafts. One of the entrances and one of the vent shafts is integrated into a new joint development building. Another entrance and vent shaft is integrated into the existing joint development building on the Brown Line.

=== Public art ===
The Red Line station has a theme of "The meeting of light and shadow - a dialogue between ground level and underground". A combination of a horizontal passage which links the space and special illumination and lighting design on the escalators strengthens the directionality of the passage space.

== Station layout ==
4F	Connecting level	Platforms-connecting overpass
3F
3F	Concourse
3F	Concourse	Lobby, information desk, automatic ticket dispensing machines, one-way faregates, restrooms
3F	Side platform, doors will open on the right
3F	Platform 1	← Wenhu line toward Taipei Nangang Exhibition Center (BR10 Zhongxiao Fuxing)
3F	Platform 2	Wenhu line toward Taipei Zoo (BR08 Technology Building) →
3F	Side platform, doors will open on the right
2F	Mezzanine	Transitlink floor for stairs and escalators
1F	Street level	Exit/entrance, Transitlink floor for stairs and escalators
B1	Concourse	Lobby, information desk, automatic ticketing dispensing machines, one-way faregates Restrooms (inside fare zone)
B2	Platform 1	← Tamsui–Xinyi line toward Tamsui / Beitou (R06 Daan Park)
B2	Island platform, doors will open on the left
B2	Platform 2	Tamsui–Xinyi line toward Guangci/Fengtian Temple (R04 Xinyi Anhe) → Tamsui–Xinyi line termination platform →

=== Exits ===
- Exit 1: North side of Xinyi Rd. Sec. 3, near Lane 147
- Exit 2: North side of Xinyi Rd. Sec. 3, near the Affiliated Senior High School of NTNU
- Exit 3: South side of Xinyi Rd. Sec. 3, near Lane 166
- Exit 4: Southeast side of Xinyi Rd. Sec. 4 and Fuxing S. Rd. Sec. 2
- Exit 5: Southeast side of Xinyi Rd. Sec. 4 and Fuxing S. Rd. Sec. 2
- Exit 6: East side of Fuxing S. Rd. Sec. 1, in front of Park Taipei Hotel

== Around the station ==
- Bureau of National Health Insurance
- American Institute in Taiwan
- Affiliated Senior High School of National Taiwan Normal University
- Taipei Municipal Da-An Vocational High School
- Daan Junior High School
- Taipei Hakka Culture Hall
- Taipei Farmers Association
- Cross-Strait Tourism Exchange Association
- Daan Forest Park

== First and last train timings ==
The first and last train timings at Daan station are as follows:

Destination	First train		Last train
Destination	Mon − Fri	Sat − Sun and P.H.	Daily
Tamsui–Xinyi line
R28 Tamsui	06:00	06:00	00:25
R01 Guangci/Fengtian Temple	06:00	06:00	00:55
Wenhu line
BR24 Taipei Nangang Exhibition Center	06:01	06:01	00:33
BR01 Taipei Zoo	06:05	06:05	00:37
