= Jingmei (disambiguation) =

Jingmei is a neighborhood in Taipei City.

Jingmei may refer to:

== Place ==
- Jingmei metro station, a metro station of the Taipei Metro.
- Jingmei Night Market, a night market in Wenshan District, Taipei, Taiwan.
- Jingmei railway station, a railway station on the Taiwan Railways Administration North-link line.
- Jingmei River, a major tributary of the Xindian River.

== People ==
- Liao Jingmei (廖婧梅), a badminton athlete in 2006 BWF World Junior Championships.
- Tang Jingmei (born 1987), a Chinese actress.
- Zhu Jingmei (d. 885), a Chinese eunuch during the late Tang Dynasty .
