= Edora Park =

- 瀚星百貨
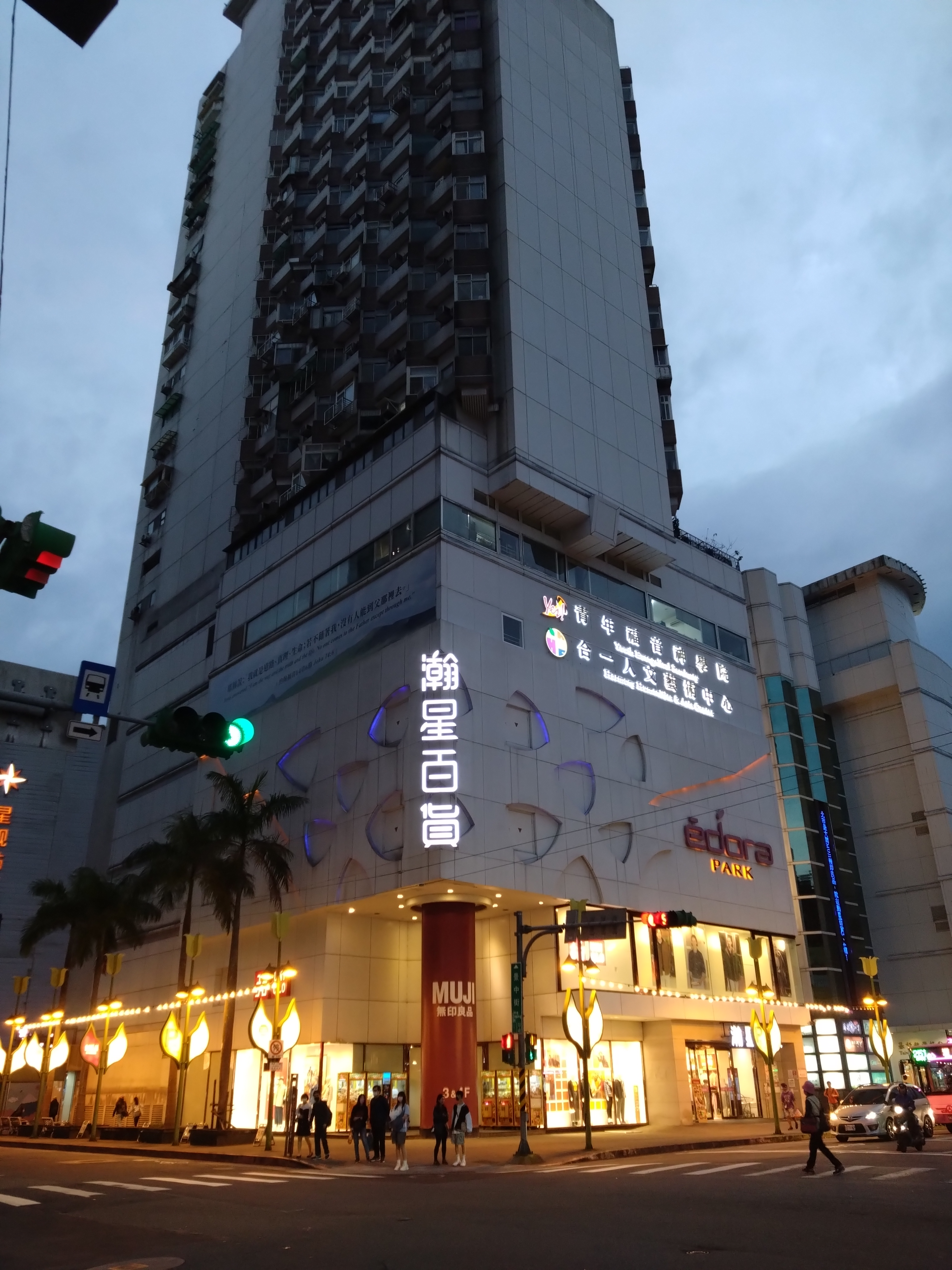
- Location: No. 188, Jingxing Road, Wenshan District, Taipei, Taiwan
- Coordinates: 24°59′33″N 121°32′38″E
- Opened: 6 June 2014
- Floors: 4 floors above ground 2 floors below ground
- Public transit: Jingmei metro station
- Website: https://edora-park.com/

Edora Park (Chinese: 瀚星百貨; pinyin: Hàn Xīng Bǎihùo) is a shopping center in Jingmei, Wenshan District, Taipei, Taiwan that opened on 6 June 2014. It is the first and largest shopping mall in the district. The main core stores of the mall include Nitori, Muji, and Daiso. The mall is located close to Jingmei metro station of the Songshan–Xindian line of Taipei Metro.

== Notable events ==
- At 7:40 pm on 23 January 2017, a fire broke out on the sixth floor of the mall and 600 people were evacuated.
- On 6 August 2015, a cook named Huang was stabbed by a man named Guo in the mall.

== See also ==
- List of tourist attractions in Taiwan
- List of shopping malls in Taipei
