= Shenkeng Old Street =

Street in Shenkeng, New Taipei, Taiwan

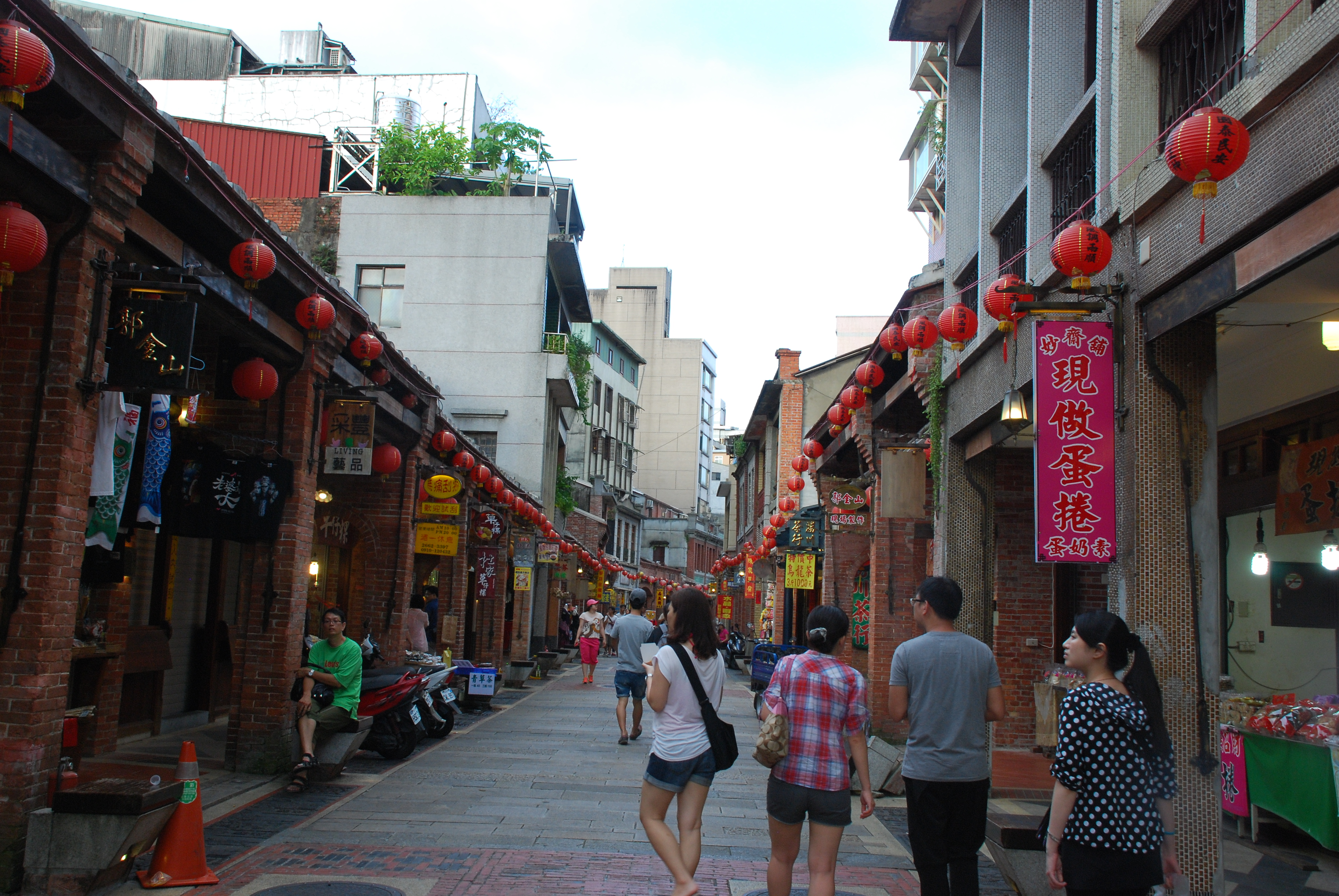

- Location within Taiwan
- Native name: 深坑老街 (Chinese)
- Type: street
- Location: Shenkeng, New Taipei, Taiwan
- Coordinates: 25°0′5.2″N 121°36′50.7″E

The Shenkeng Old Street (Chinese: 深坑老街; pinyin: Dàxī Lǎojiē) is an old street in Shenkeng District, New Taipei, Taiwan.

== History ==
In the 1980s, local residents campaigned against the demolition of the buildings along the street as part of the proposed road widening and redevelopment project. In 2010, a large-scale restoration project began. The management committee of the old street was established in 2014. In 2013, a regulation regulating the management of the old streets in New Taipei was enacted, enabling the committee to collect funds to preserve the heritage buildings of the old street.

== Features ==
The street is famous for its tofu-related food, such as tofu gourmet, tofu snacks and tofu popsicle from various types of tofu.

== Transportation ==
The street is accessible by taxi from Muzha Station of Taipei Metro or by bus 912 from MRT Taipei City Hall Station

== See also ==
- List of roads in Taiwan
- List of tourist attractions in Taiwan
