= Taipei Municipal Wanfang Hospital =

Hospital in Wenshan, Taipei, Taiwan

Taipei Municipal Wanfang Hospital 臺北市立萬芳醫院
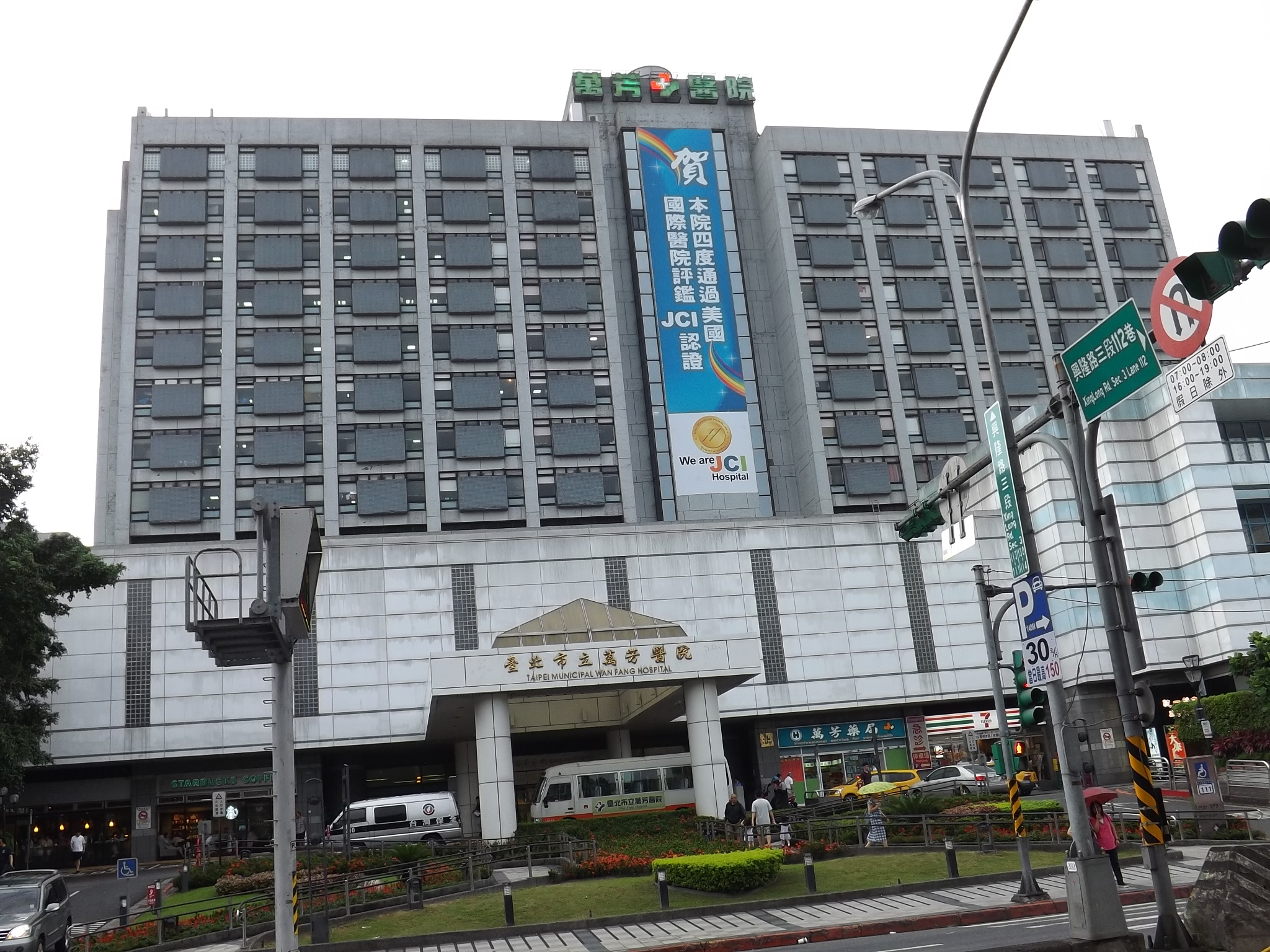

Geography
- Location: Wenshan District, Taipei, Taiwan
- Coordinates: 25°0′0.31″N 121°33′30″E

Organisation
- Care system: Private
- Type: Municipal

Services
- Emergency department: Yes
- Beds: 908

History
- Opened: 5 February 1997

Links
- Website: Official website

The Taipei Municipal Wanfang Hospital (Chinese: 臺北市立萬芳醫院; pinyin: Táiběi Shìlì Wànfāng Yīyuàn) is a municipal hospital located in Wenshan District, Taipei, Taiwan.

== History ==
The hospital was opened on February 15, 1997, it is operated by Taipei Medical University (TMU) under a contract with the Taipei City Government. It serves as the second affiliated hospital of Taipei Medical University.

== History and accreditation ==
The hospital was established to provide medical services to the southern districts of Taipei. In 2004, it passed the hospital accreditation by the Joint Commission of Taiwan (JCT) and was elevated to the status of a Medical Center.

Wanfang Hospital holds several specialized certifications, including Heavy Responsibility Emergency Hospital, Cancer Care Quality Certification, Organ Donation and Transplant Hospital, and Age-Friendly Health Care Institution.

== Medical services ==
The hospital focuses on emergency and critical care as well as the integration of chronic disease management, catering to an aging population. It operates 13 specialized medical centers, including a Cardiovascular Center, Organ Transplant Center, and Tuberculosis Center.

The hospital has adopted a multi-disciplinary team approach for heart care and utilizes smart monitoring systems. In the fields of Obstetrics, Gynecology, Urology, and General surgery, the hospital utilizes the 3D Da Vinci Surgical System for minimally invasive procedures to improve precision and reduce recovery time.

== Smart healthcare ==
Wanfang Hospital has implemented information technology to support clinical decision-making and patient management.

- 2022: Received the "National Healthcare Quality Award - Smart Hospital Full Institution Label" from the Joint Commission of Taiwan.
- 2025: Achieved HIMSS EMRAM Stage 6 certification, recognizing its maturity in electronic medical records, clinical decision support, and information security https://www.wanfang.gov.tw/departments/news/post/b7986c8487e567d5.

== International cooperation ==
The hospital participates in international medical aid and capacity building, coordinating with Taiwan's Ministry of Health and Welfare and the Ministry of Foreign Affairs.

- Eswatini: The hospital executes an early cancer diagnosis and treatment program, providing medical equipment and professional support.
- Somaliland: Cooperation focuses on clinical training and healthcare system strengthening. The hospital has signed a medical planning agreement extending through 2026.
- Philippines: Under the "New Southbound Policy Phase 3," the hospital collaborates with Far Eastern University (FEU) on medical student exchange programs, sub-specialty training, and telemedicine consultation.

== Transportation ==
The hospital is accessible from Wanfang Hospital metro station on the Wenhu Line of Taipei Metro.

== See also ==
- List of hospitals in Taiwan
