= Hsu Yu-chuan =

Taiwanese Technician

- 许玉钏
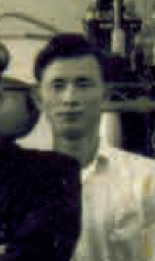
- Born: 1928; Shinchiku Prefecture, Taiwan under Japanese rule
- Died: September 18, 2017 (aged 88–89)
- Known for: Producing Southeast Asia's first locally made laser scalpel and an educational electron gun
- Spouse: Liu Pao-hsiu
- Scientific career
- Fields: Scientific instrument making
- Workplaces: Taihoku Imperial University; National Taiwan University

Hsu Yu-chuan (1928 – 18 September 2017) was a Taiwanese scientific instrument technician and master scientific glassblower from Shinchiku Prefecture, Taiwan. He worked at both Taihoku Imperial University(1928) and the National Taiwan University Department of Physics, where he became known for his expertise in the fabrication of scientific glassware.

In 1945, Hsu was hired as a technician's assistant by Jiro Tayama at Taihoku Imperial University, where he received training in scientific glassblowing. During this period, he also produced laboratory glassware for chemist Tetsuo Nozoe, who later became the first Japanese scientist to be nominated for the Nobel Prize in Chemistry. Following the end of World War II, Hsu joined the reconstruction of a Cockcroft–Walton generator at National Taiwan University under the leadership of Yoritsune Ota and Hsu Yun-Ki. The team conducted the first postwar artificial-nucleus collision experiment in the Republic of China, and one of the earliest such experiments in postwar Asia, in 1948.

In addition to manufacturing glass components for particle accelerators, Hsu contributed to the development of Taiwan's first medical laser scalpel and its first educational electron gun. He was widely referred to as a “national treasure” of Taiwan's scientific glassmaking community for his decades of contributions to scientific research and education.

== Biography ==
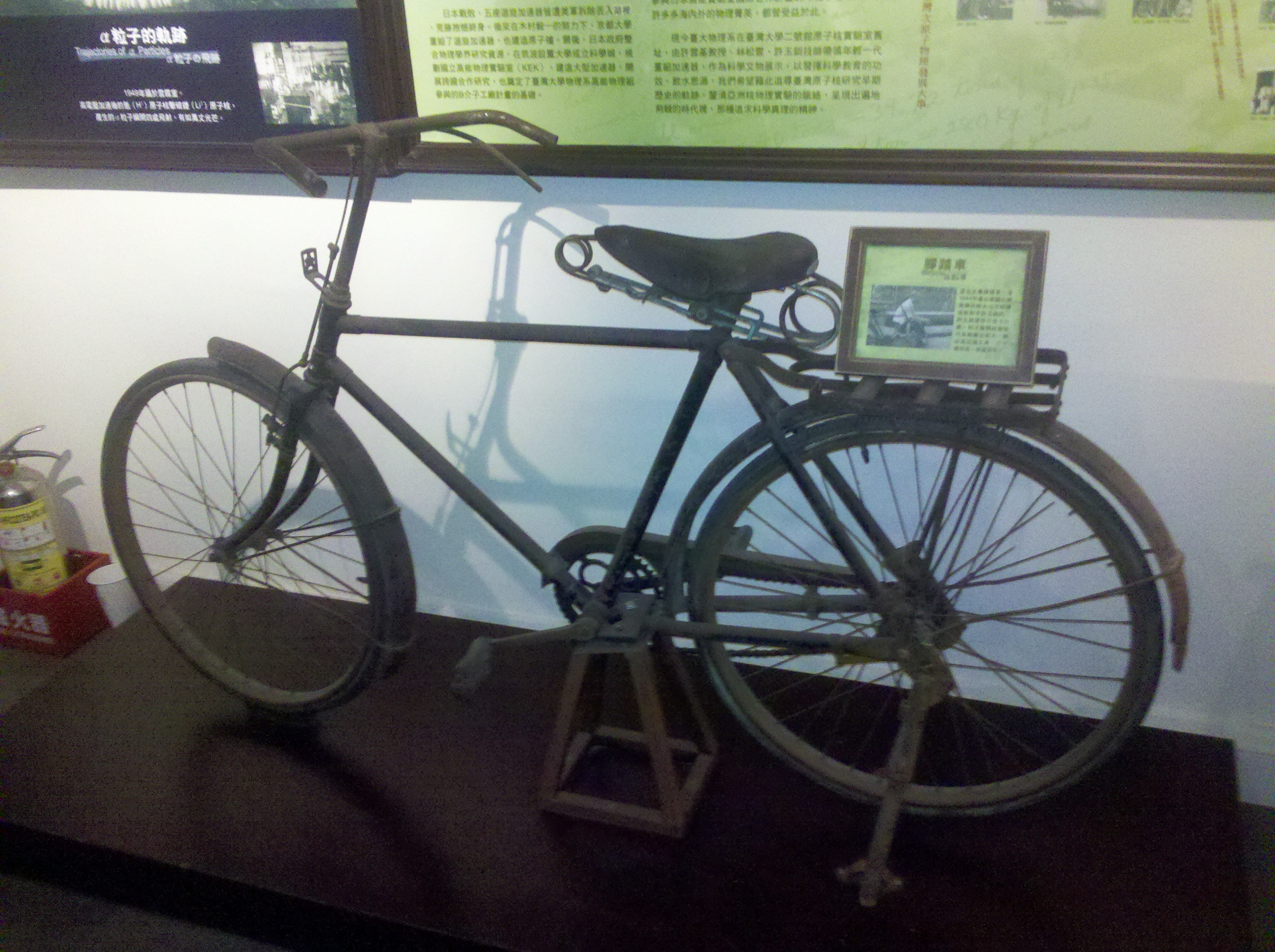
Hsu's bicycle, now preserved in the National Taiwan University Physics Heritage Hall.

=== Early life ===
Hsu Yu-chuan was born in 1928 in Shinchiku Prefecture, Taiwan, then part of the Empire of Japan. He was the only child in his family. Hsu's mother died when he was six years old, and his father died when he was twelve. Due to financial hardship, he was forced to leave school and did not complete elementary education until the age of seventeen, graduating as the oldest student in his class. After graduation, he initially hoped to become a Buddhist statue engraver. However, on a teacher's recommendation, he entered a glass factory in Hsinchu as an apprentice, beginning his career in glassworking.

In 1944, Hsu enrolled in a training program operated by the factory. Upon completing the program in 1945, he was selected by Jiro Tayama, a scientific glass technician at Taihoku Imperial University(1928) and a consultant to the factory, as one of ten trainees chosen to serve as his assistant at the university. According to Hsu's later recollections, Tayama provided extensive guidance and support, teaching him scientific glassblowing techniques and allowing him to live in his home. Tayama also purchased a bicycle for Hsu so that he could commute to the university for work. During this period, Hsu produced laboratory glassware for the research of an organic chemist Tetsuo Nozoe, who later became the first Japanese scientist to be nominated for the Nobel Prize in Chemistry. (Note: At the time, Tetsuo Nozoe was primarily engaged in research on essential oils derived from Taiwan's alpine plants. His work on hinoki cypress oil led to the development of what was then the only treatment for tuberculosis available in Taiwan. He later became the first Japanese scientist to be nominated for the Nobel Prize in Chemistry.)

=== Postwar period ===
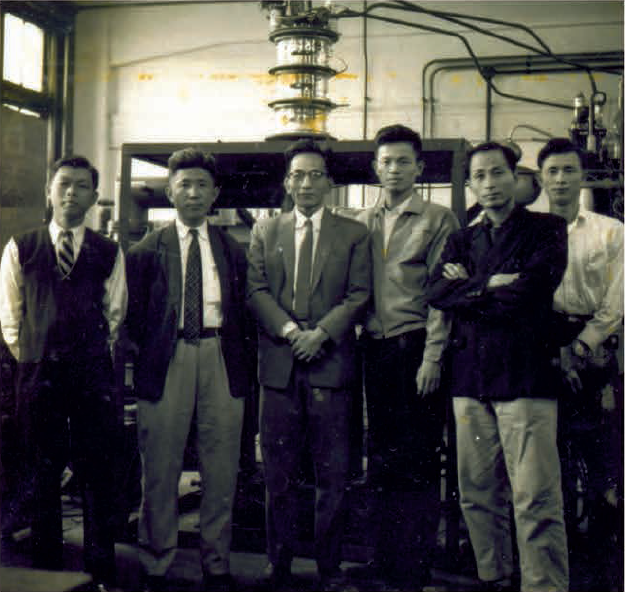
Members of the National Taiwan University nuclear physics laboratory in 1948. From left to right: Hsu Tung-tang, Chou Mu-chun, Yun-ki Hsu, Liu Yuan-chung, Lin Sung-yun, and Hsu Yu-chuan.

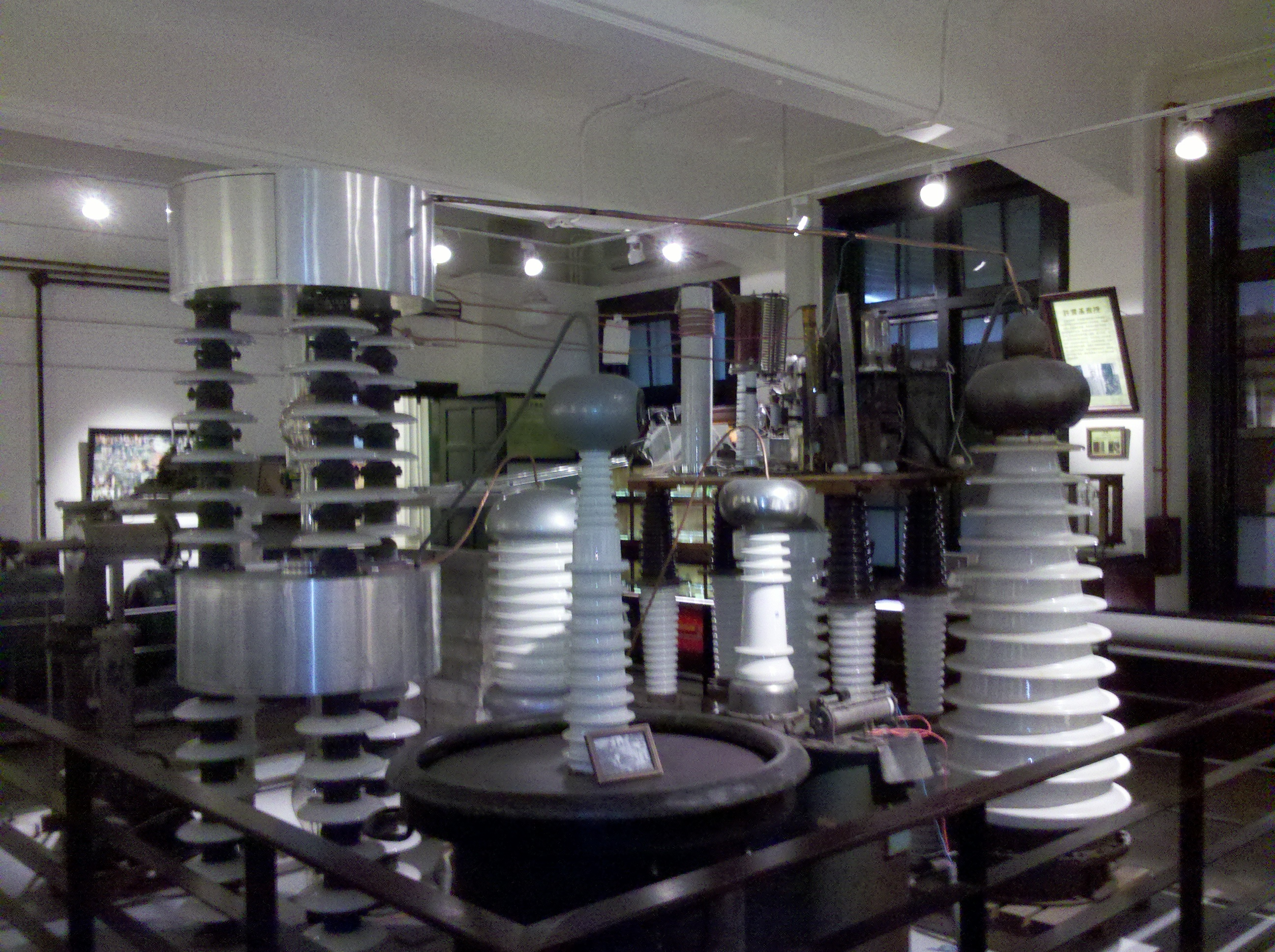
The reconstructed Cockcroft–Walton generator currently displayed in the NTU Physics Heritage Hall.

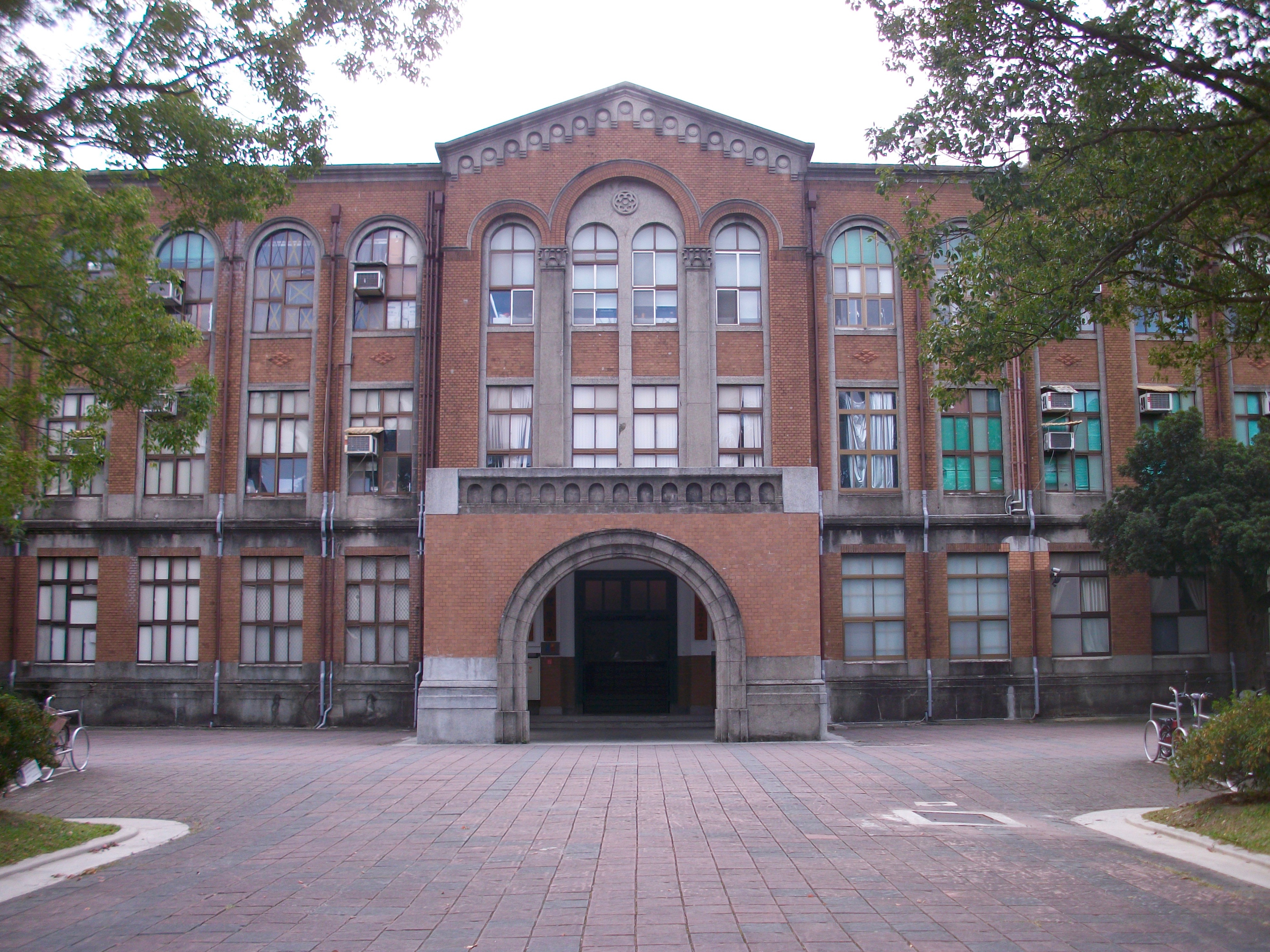
Built on 3 May 1931 as the Physics and Chemistry Building of Taihoku Imperial University(1928). The building now houses the NTU Physics Heritage Hall, formerly the university's nuclear physics laboratory.

Following the end of World War II, Hsu worked under the leadership of Yoritsune Ota and Hsu Yun-Ki, together with Suetsugu Kawada, Chou Mu-chun, Lin Sung-yun, and others, to reconstruct the Cockcroft–Walton generator (Note: See Bunsaku Arakatsu for details of the experiment.) originally built by Bunsaku Arakatsu and his colleagues. The original accelerator was used in 1934 at Taihoku Imperial University(1928) to conduct the second successful artificial nuclear transmutation experiment in the world. Hsu was responsible for fabricating all of the glass apparatus required for the reconstruction project. The reconstruction project began in October 1946. After nearly two years of work, the team successfully conducted an artificial nuclear-collision experiment at 8:35 p.m. on 13 May 1948. The experiment was the first artificial nuclear collision experiment conducted in the Republic of China and the first such experiment in postwar Asia.

Under the direction of Yun-ki Hsu, the group later constructed a Cloud chamber for observing the trajectories of alpha particles. The accelerator was subsequently modified to achieve higher-energy nuclear reactions, and high-energy neutrons generated through reactions involving helium-4 were used to investigate secondary nuclear reactions. To obtain heavy water for these experiments, Hsu constructed a Mercury-arc valve using Pyrex beakers and electrodes salvaged from discarded high-power vacuum tubes formerly used by the Broadcasting Corporation of China. Unable to locate suitable glass tubing matching the original design specifications, he melted and fused five glass beakers together, designed a supporting frame, and attached three flasks to create the apparatus. The most difficult aspect of the construction was embedding a nickel wire approximately five centimeters in diameter into the bottom of the device without breaking the glass. Hsu consulted numerous Japanese-language technical manuals before successfully solving the problem. After approximately 1 year of effort, the team succeeded in producing heavy water with a concentration of 98%.

In 1982, Taipei Veterans General Hospital received support from the Y. S. Sun Scientific Research Center at National Taiwan University to establish a laser surgery program. Rather than purchasing equipment from overseas, the project leaders decided to develop the system domestically in cooperation with the National Taiwan University Departments of Physics and Electrical Engineering. In 1985, the team successfully completed the first domestically produced medical laser scalpel in Taiwan and the first self-developed laser surgical system in Southeast Asia. Hsu fabricated the laser vacuum tube, one of the device's core components. When Yun-ki Hsu retired from the Department of Physics in 1985, the Cockcroft–Walton generator was dismantled due to space constraints. Reluctant to see the historic equipment lost, Hsu and technician Lin Sung-yun secretly preserved its components by storing them in various locations for nearly two decades. Components were hidden in warehouses, basements, and even above bathroom ceilings. In 2004, the Department of Physics at National Taiwan University initiated a project to reconstruct the accelerator. Under the leadership of Yun-ki Hsu, Hsu Yu-chuan, and Lin Sung-yun, the scattered components were recovered, and the original nuclear physics laboratory was rebuilt, becoming the NTU Physics Heritage Hall. The museum officially opened on 21 November 2005. The restoration process was documented in the film 'Breaking Through the Atomic Nucleus'.

According to a 1987 survey, only three university technicians specializing in scientific glassblowing remained in Taiwan, and the other two had been trained by Hsu. He retired from the Department of Physics at National Taiwan University in January 1994. Hsu’s life and career were later documented in the film 'The Physical World of an Old Technician' (Chinese: 老技師的物理世界), (Note: The film premiered on 20 October 2005.) which premiered on 20 October 2005. Following his retirement, the Department of Physics temporarily incorporated scientific glassblowing into its required curriculum to preserve the craft, though the course has since been discontinued.

== Personal life ==
While serving as a technical instructor at a pharmaceutical glass bottle factory, Hsu met his future wife, Liu Pao-hsiu, and the two later married. According to Liu, Hsu tended to become withdrawn whenever he was preoccupied with a technical problem. She recalled that he would eat less, sleep poorly, and sit quietly after returning home from work. This behavior was most pronounced in 1951, when he spent more than a month working on a Mercury-arc valve used in the electrolytic production of heavy water.

During his career as a technician in the Department of Physics at National Taiwan University, Hsu earned approximately NT$20,000 per month. At one point, a scientific glassware company offered him a position with a monthly salary of NT$50,000, but he declined, stating that he found greater meaning in conducting research alongside university professors. Outside his professional work, Hsu enjoyed mountaineering and stream fishing. He frequently fished in the Liugongju and in the mountain areas. Most of the fish he caught were released, although he occasionally kept particularly attractive or easy-to-raise fish as pets. Because scientific glassblowing required continuous concentration, Hsu rarely answered telephone calls while working. He explained that interruptions could ruin an entire piece of work. As a result, colleagues usually visited his workshop in person and knocked on the glass door to get his attention. According to Lin Sung-yun, the door was knocked on so frequently that it often seemed as though it might break.

== Selected publications ==
- Low Background Counter for Carbon-14 Dating (1965).
- Carbon-14 Dating. I (1965).
- Wilson Cloud Chamber for the Study of the (n, α) Reaction (1968).
- 12C(n, α)^9Be Reaction at 14.1 MeV (1969).
- 20Ne(n, α)^17O Reaction Induced by 14.1 MeV Neutrons (1972).
- 40Ca(n, α)^37Ar Reaction at 14.1 MeV (1973).
- Counter Telescope for Studying 14 MeV Neutron-induced Reactions (1975).
- Surface Treatment of the Al Cold Cathode for He-Ne Laser (1975).
- Investigation of the 32S(n, α)^29Si Reaction at 14.1 MeV (1976).
- 150 keV Heavy Ion Generator for Sputtering Studies (1978).

== See also ==
- Fumi-saku Arakatsu
- Hsu Yun-Ki
- Tetsuo Nozoe
- Department of Physics, National Taiwan University
- NTU Physics Heritage Hall
