= Muzha District =

Former district of Taipei, Taiwan

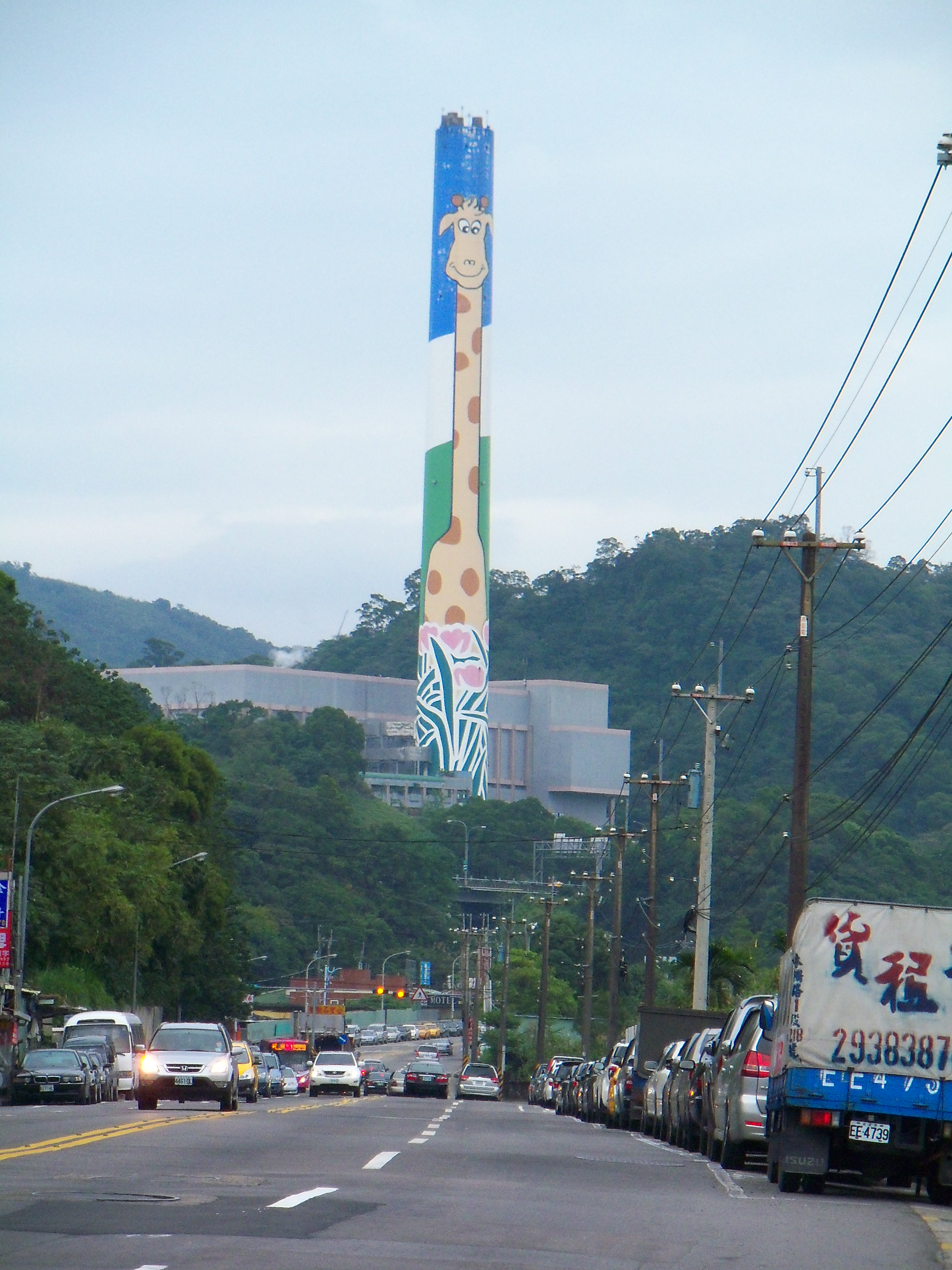
Muzha

Muzha (Chinese: 木柵; pinyin: Mùzhà; Wade–Giles: Mu^{4}-cha^{4}; Pe̍h-ōe-jī: Ba̍k-sa; lit. 'wood fence'), alternatively romanized Mucha, was a district in Taipei City, Taiwan. The name refers to wooden fences built in the region to defend against attacks by Taiwanese Indigenous peoples.

During Qing rule, the area belonged to Tamsui Prefecture. After 1920, during Japanese rule, the area belonged to both Naiko (內湖) and (坡內坑) of Shinkō Village (深坑庄) of Bunsan District, Taihoku Prefecture (modern-day Shenkeng District and Neihu District).

Muzha was transferred from Taipei County to become a district of Taipei City. In 1990, it merged with Jingmei District to become Wenshan District.

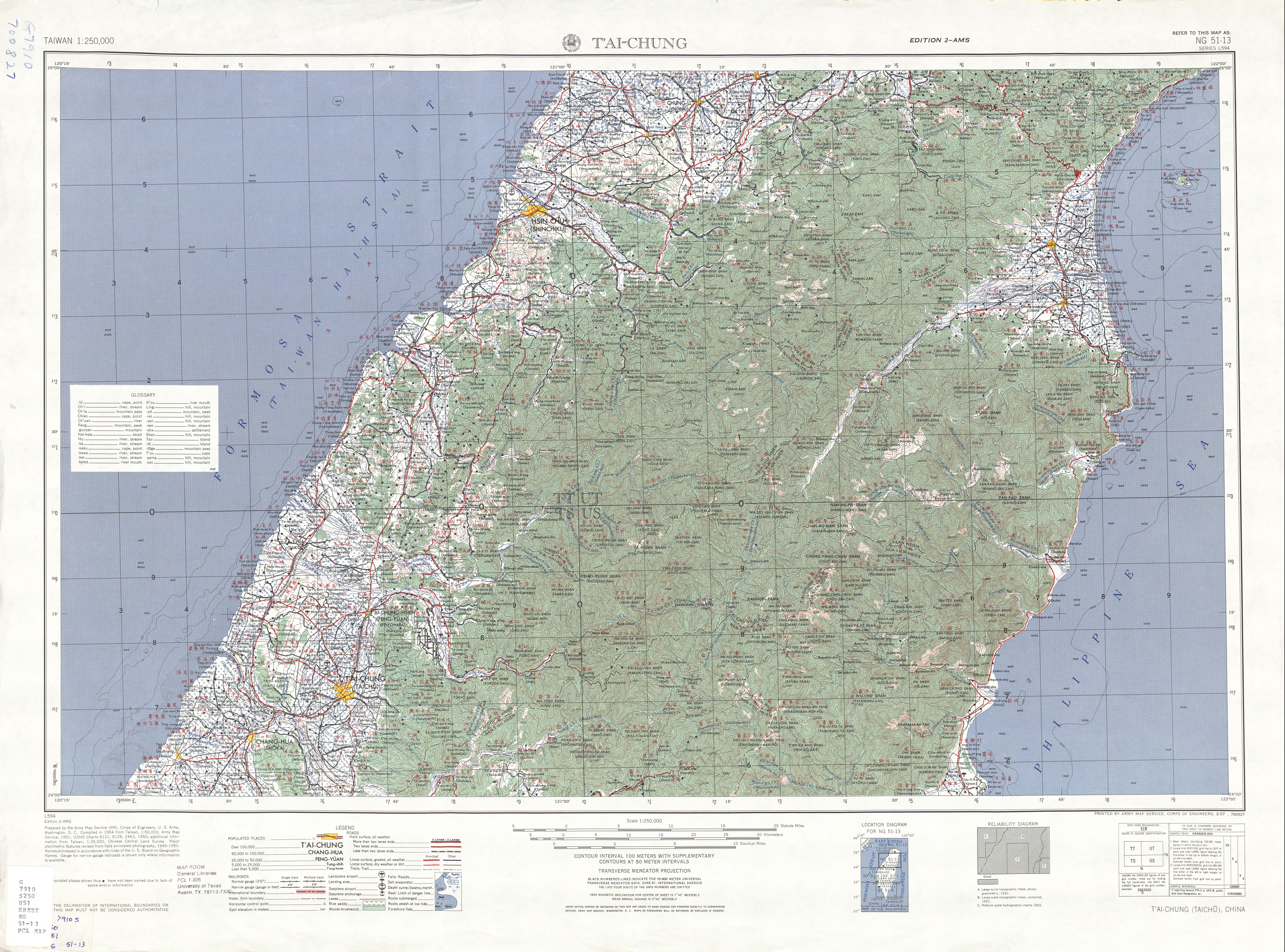
Map including Muzha (labeled as Mu-cha (Mōkusaku) 木柵) (1954)

== Landmarks ==
- Taipei Zoo
- National Chengchi University
- Shih Hsin University
- Jingmei Girls' Senior High School (景美女中), located within Muzha
- Maokong: Main area for Wenshan Paochung tea, produced in Taipei City.
- Chi Nan Temple
- Beautistyle Inc.

== See also ==
- Wenshan District
