= Jingmei District =

Former district of Taipei, Taiwan

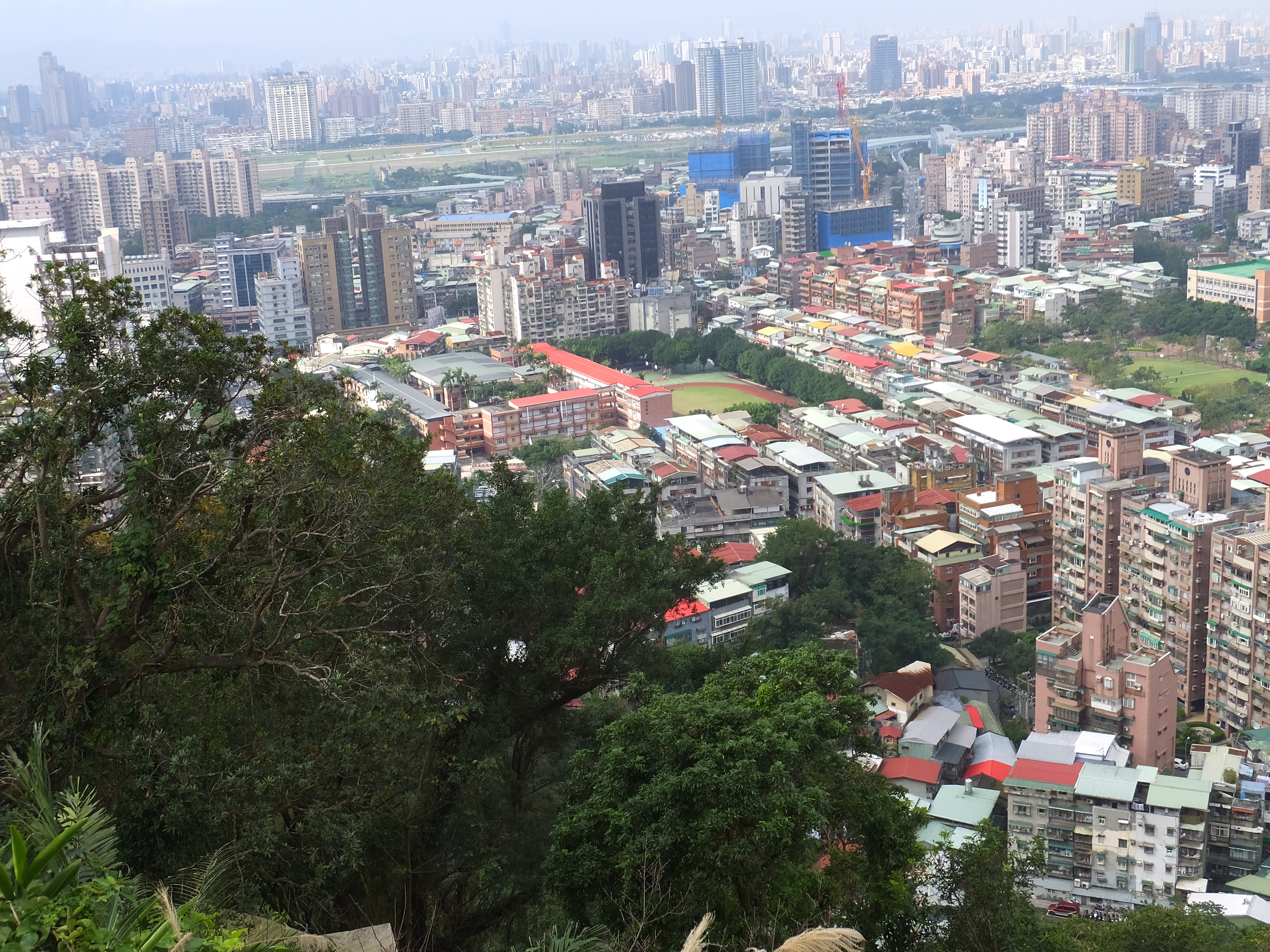
Jingmei District

Jingmei (Chinese: 景美; pinyin: Jǐngměi; Wade–Giles: Ching^{3}-mei^{3}; lit. 'beautiful scenery') is a neighborhood in Taipei City. Formerly an administrative district, in 1990 it merged with Muzha District, becoming the western part of the newly created Wenshan District.

Jingmei is located south of downtown Taipei with adjacency with Xindian, New Taipei City. Jingmei is known for its locally famous night market. The market includes hundreds, if not thousands, of small street vendors, selling items, including traditional Chinese and Taiwanese snacks, cheap clothes, and various other items. The Jingmei area also includes many stores, upscale restaurants, movie theaters, and karaoke establishments, making it a popular destination for nights and weekends for the local population. Jingmei Night Market is accessible by subway via Jingmei Station, which is serviced by the Songshan–Xindian line or Green line of the Taipei Metro. Jingmei also serves as a small transportation hub for local buses, since many bus routes run through the area.

Jingmei has a centrally located small park, adjacent to Jingxing Junior High-School.

Several scenic walks and panoramic views of Jingmei and of downtown Taipei are available around Xianjiyan Temple. Xianjiyan is situated on a small hill and accessible by an easy path from Jingxing Street. The shortest route up and down takes about 20 minutes each way.

== History ==
The former name Kingbe (Chinese: 梘尾; Pe̍h-ōe-jī: Kéng-bé), refers to the large spouts of the Liugongjun irrigation system. The name was later modified (景尾; Kéng-bé).

During Japanese rule, the area was under the jurisdiction of Shinkō Village (深坑庄), Bunsan District, Taihoku Prefecture. After World War II, the area remained part of Shenkeng Township. In 1950, the more elegant name Jingmei (景美) was adopted and stood on its own as an urban township. However, in Taiwanese the old name Kéng-bé is still used.

In 1967, the township was merged into Taipei City as Jingmei District. In 1990, it merged with Muzha District to create Wenshan District.

== See also ==
- Wenshan District
