= Wanfang Community metro station =

Metro station in Taipei, Taiwan

Wanfang Community 萬芳社區
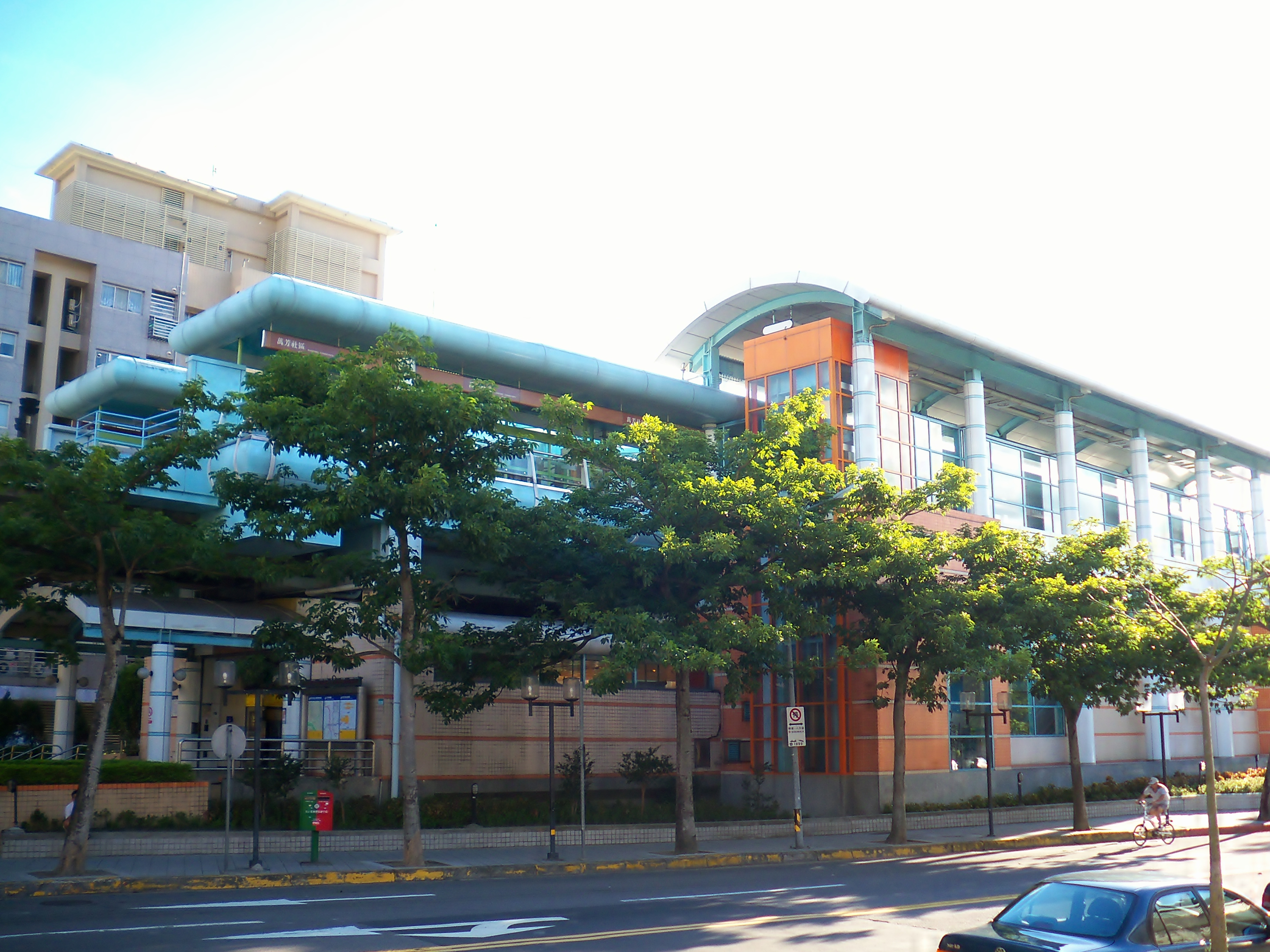
- Wanfang Community station

Chinese name
- Traditional Chinese: 萬芳社區
- Simplified Chinese: 万芳社区
Transcriptions
Standard Mandarin
- Hanyu Pinyin: Wànfāng Shèqū
- Bopomofo: ㄨㄢˋ ㄈㄤ ㄕㄜˋ ㄑㄩ
Hakka
- Pha̍k-fa-sṳ: Van-fông Sa-khî
Southern Min
- Tâi-lô: Bān-hong Siā-khu

General information
- Location: No. 60, Wanfang Rd. Wenshan, Taipei; Taiwan
- Coordinates: 24.998639°N 121.56801°E
- System: Taipei Metro station
- Operator: Taipei Metro
- Line: Wenhu line
- Connections: Bus stop

Construction
- Structure type: Elevated

Other information
- Station code: BR03

History
- Opened: 28 March 1996; 30 years ago

Passengers
- 4,826 daily (December 2024)
- Rank: (Ranked 115 of 119)

Services
Preceding station	Taipei Metro	Following station
Muzha towards Taipei Zoo	Wenhu line	Wanfang Hospital towards Nangang Exhib Center
Location

Wanfang Community station is a station on Wenhu line of the Taipei Metro, located in Wenshan District, Taipei, Taiwan.

== Station overview ==
The two-level, elevated station has two side platforms, and has a single exit. It is located on the south side of Wanfang Rd., close to its intersection with Wanhe Rd.

== Station layout ==
2F
2F	Side platform, doors will open on the right
2F	Platform 1	← Wenhu line toward Taipei Nangang Exhibition Center (BR04 Wanfang Hospital)
2F	Platform 2	→ Wenhu line toward Taipei Zoo (BR02 Muzha) →
2F	Side platform, doors will open on the right

1F
1F	Concourse	Exit/entrance, lobby, information desk, automatic ticket dispensing machines, one-way faregates, restrooms

=== Exits ===
- Single exit: Wanfang Rd.

== Around the station ==
- Wanfang Community
- Wanfang Elementary School
- Yuanye Sports Park
