= Linguang metro station =

Metro station in Taipei, Taiwan

Linguang 麟光
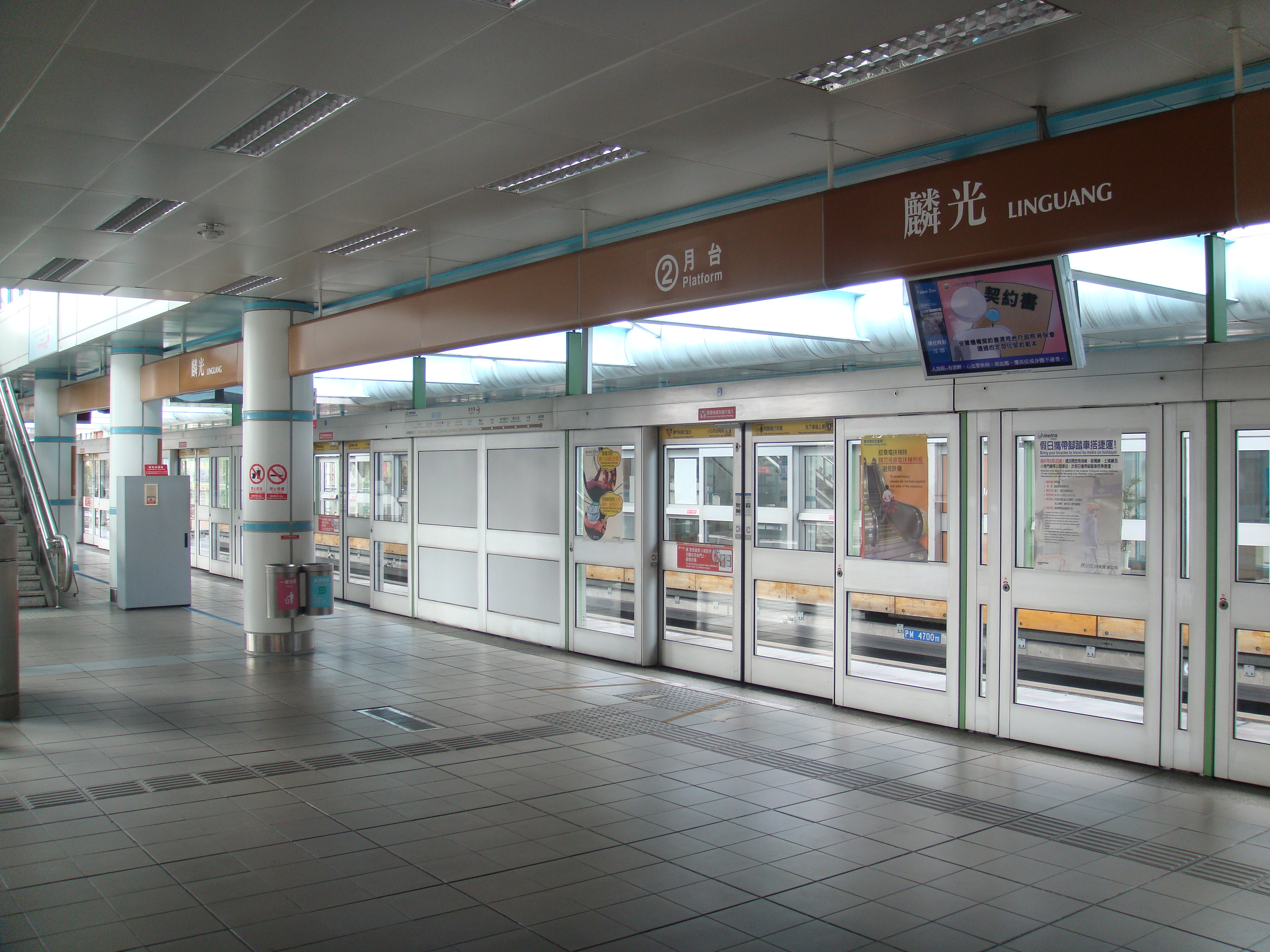
- Linguang station platform

Chinese name
- Chinese: 麟光
Transcriptions
Standard Mandarin
- Hanyu Pinyin: Línguāng
- Bopomofo: ㄌㄧㄣˊ ㄍㄨㄤ
Hakka
- Pha̍k-fa-sṳ: Lîn-kông
Southern Min
- Tâi-lô: Lîn-kong

General information
- Location: No. 410, Sec. 3, Heping E. Rd. Da’an and Xinyi, Taipei; Taiwan
- Coordinates: 25.018328°N 121.55878°E
- Operator: Taipei Metro
- Line: Wenhu line
- Connections: Bus stop

Construction
- Structure type: Elevated

Other information
- Station code: BR06

History
- Opened: 28 March 1996; 30 years ago

Passengers
- daily (December 2024)
- Rank: 71 out of 109 and 5 others

Services
Preceding station	Taipei Metro	Following station
Xinhai towards Taipei Zoo	Wenhu line	Liuzhangli towards Nangang Exhib Center
Location

Linguang station (formerly transliterated as Linkuang Station until 2003) is a station on the Brown Line of the Taipei Metro, located on the border of the Da'an and Xinyi districts of Taipei, Taiwan.

== Station overview ==
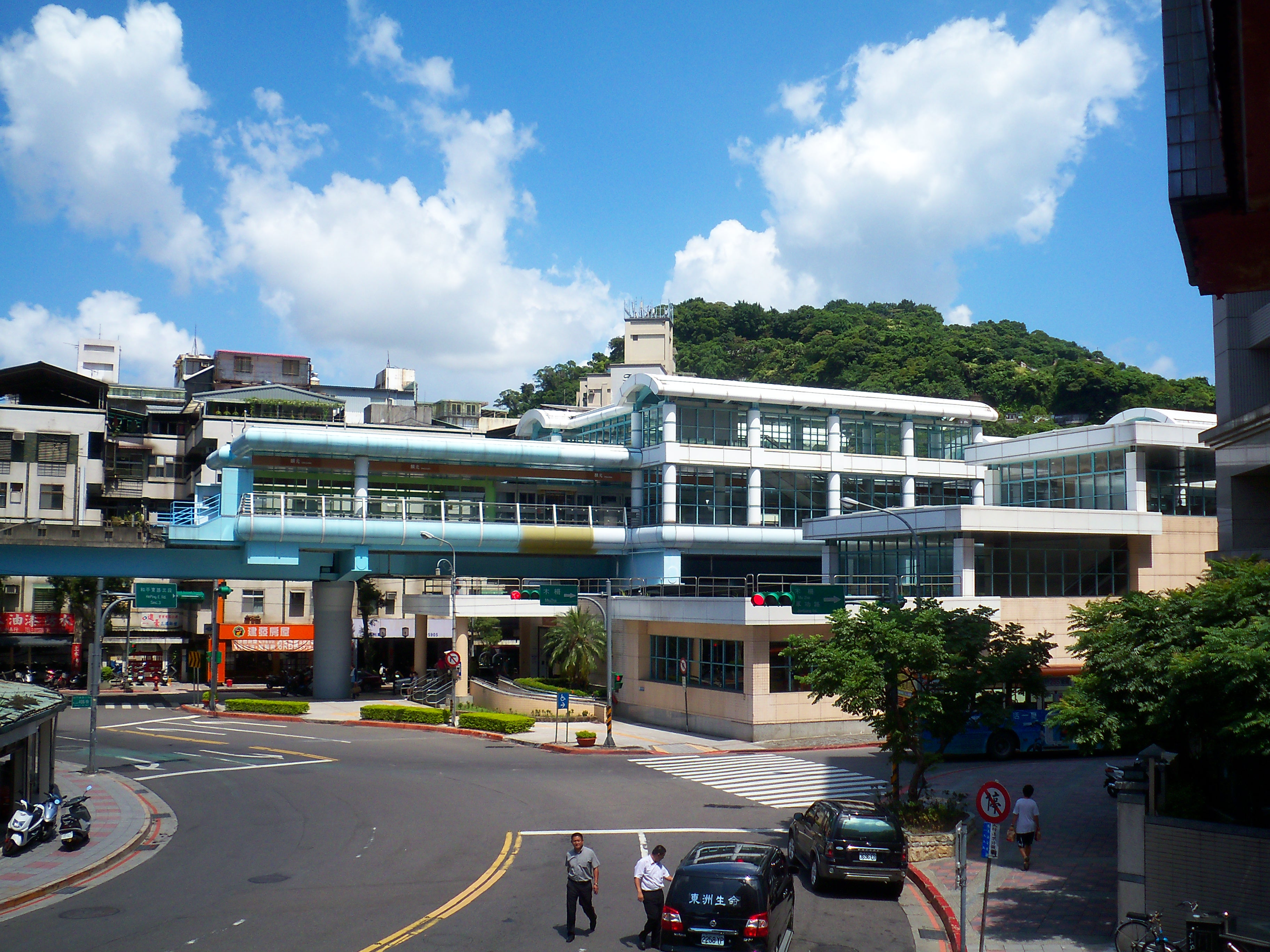
Linguang station

The three-level, elevated station has two side platforms, and a single exit.

== Station layout ==
4F	Connecting level	Platforms-connecting overpass
3F
3F	Side platform, doors will open on the right
3F	Platform 1	← Wenhu line toward Taipei Nangang Exhibition Center (BR07 Liuzhangli)
3F	Platform 2	→ Wenhu line toward Taipei Zoo (BR05 Xinhai) →
3F	Side platform, doors will open on the right

1F	Concourse level	Exit/entrance, Lobby, information desk, automatic ticket dispensing machines, one-way faregates, restrooms

=== Exits ===
- Single exit: On Heping East Rd.

== Around the station ==
- Coastal Patrol Directorate General
- Linguang New Community
- Fuyang Natural Ecological Park
- Fuzhoushan Park
- Lizhong Park
- Taipei Muslim Cemetery
