= Wanlong metro station =

Metro station in Taipei, Taiwan

Wanlong 萬隆
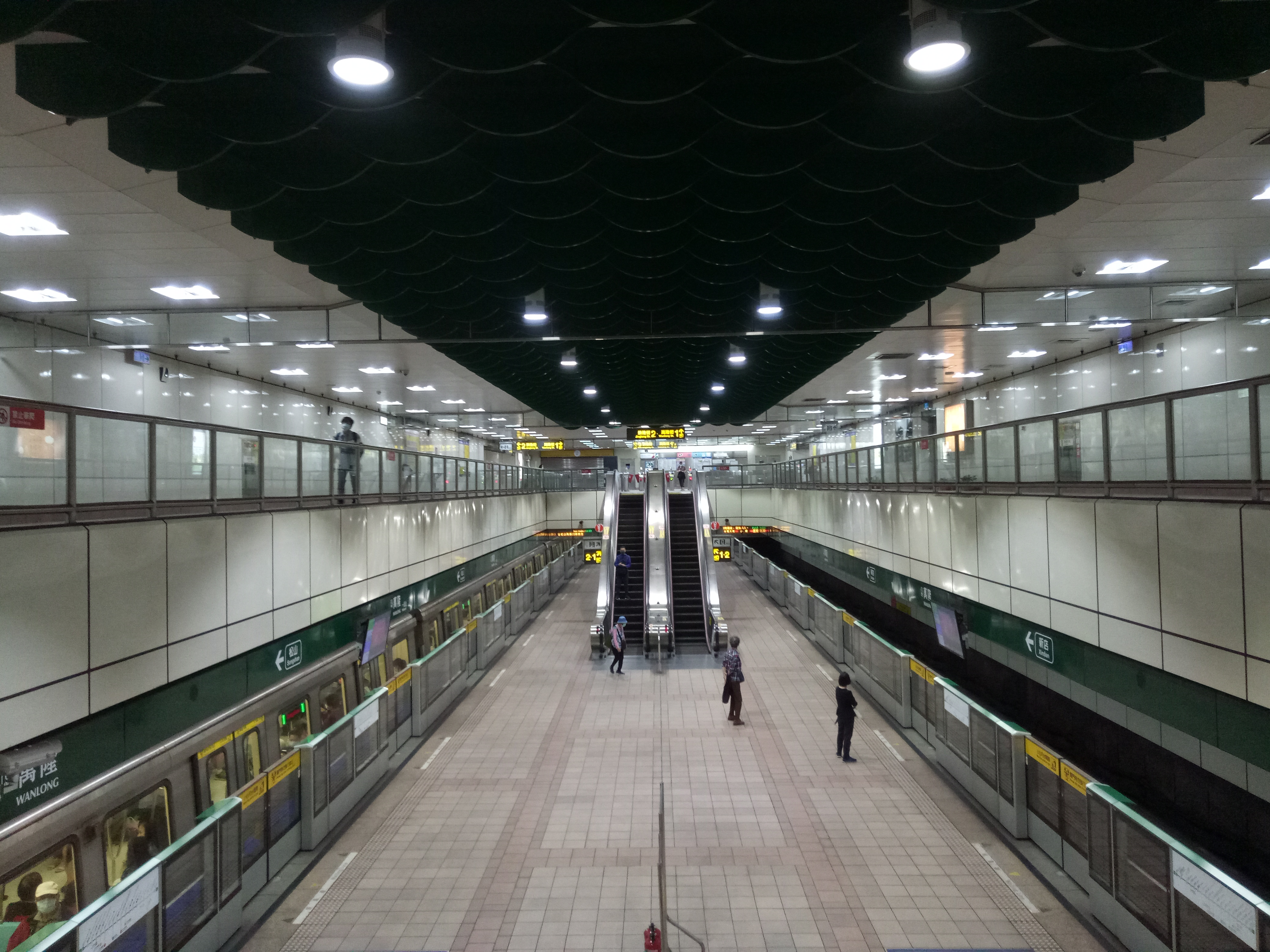
- Platform

Chinese name
- Traditional Chinese: 萬隆
- Simplified Chinese: 万隆
Transcriptions
Standard Mandarin
- Hanyu Pinyin: Wànlóng
- Bopomofo: ㄨㄢˋ ㄌㄨㄥˊ
- Wade–Giles: Wan⁴-lung²
Hakka
- Pha̍k-fa-sṳ: Van-lùng
Southern Min
- Tâi-lô: Bān-liông

General information
- Location: No. 214, Sec. 5, Roosevelt Rd. Wenshan, Taipei; Taiwan
- Coordinates: 25.001884°N 121.539001°E
- Operator: Taipei Metro
- Line: Songshan–Xindian Line
- Connections: Bus stop

Construction
- Structure type: Pseudoground

Other information
- Station code: G06

History
- Opened: 11 November 1999; 27 years ago

Passengers
- daily (December 2024)
- Rank: 10 out of 109 and 1 other

Services
Preceding station	Taipei Metro	Following station
Gongguan towards Songshan	Songshan–Xindian Line	Jingmei towards Xindian
Location

The Taipei Metro Wanlong station (formerly transliterated as Wanlung Station until 2003) is a station on the Songshan–Xindian line located in Wenshan District, Taipei, Taiwan. It was a former station of the now-defunct Xindian line of the Taiwan Railways Administration.

== Station overview ==
This two-level, underground station has an island platform and four exits.

== Station layout ==
Street level	Exit/entrance	Exit/entrance
B1	Concourse	Lobby, toilets, one-way ticket machine, information desk
B2	Platform 1	← Songshan–Xindian line toward Songshan (G07 Gongguan)
B2	Island platform, doors will open on the left
B2	Platform 2	→ Songshan–Xindian line toward Xindian (G05 Jingmei) →

=== Exits ===
- Exit 1: Roosevelt Rd. Sec. 5 and Roosevelt Rd. Sec. 5 Lane 236
- Exit 2: Roosevelt Rd. Sec. 5
- Exit 3: Roosevelt Rd. Sec. 5 and Roosevelt Rd. Sec. 5 Lane 211
- Exit 4: Roosevelt Rd. Sec. 5 and Roosevelt Rd. Sec. 5 Lane 212

== Around the station ==
- Taipei Pot Plant Auction
- Wenshan Jingmei Sports Park
- Xizhou Riverside Park
