= Wanfang Hospital metro station =

Metro station in Taipei, Taiwan

Wanfang Hospital 萬芳醫院
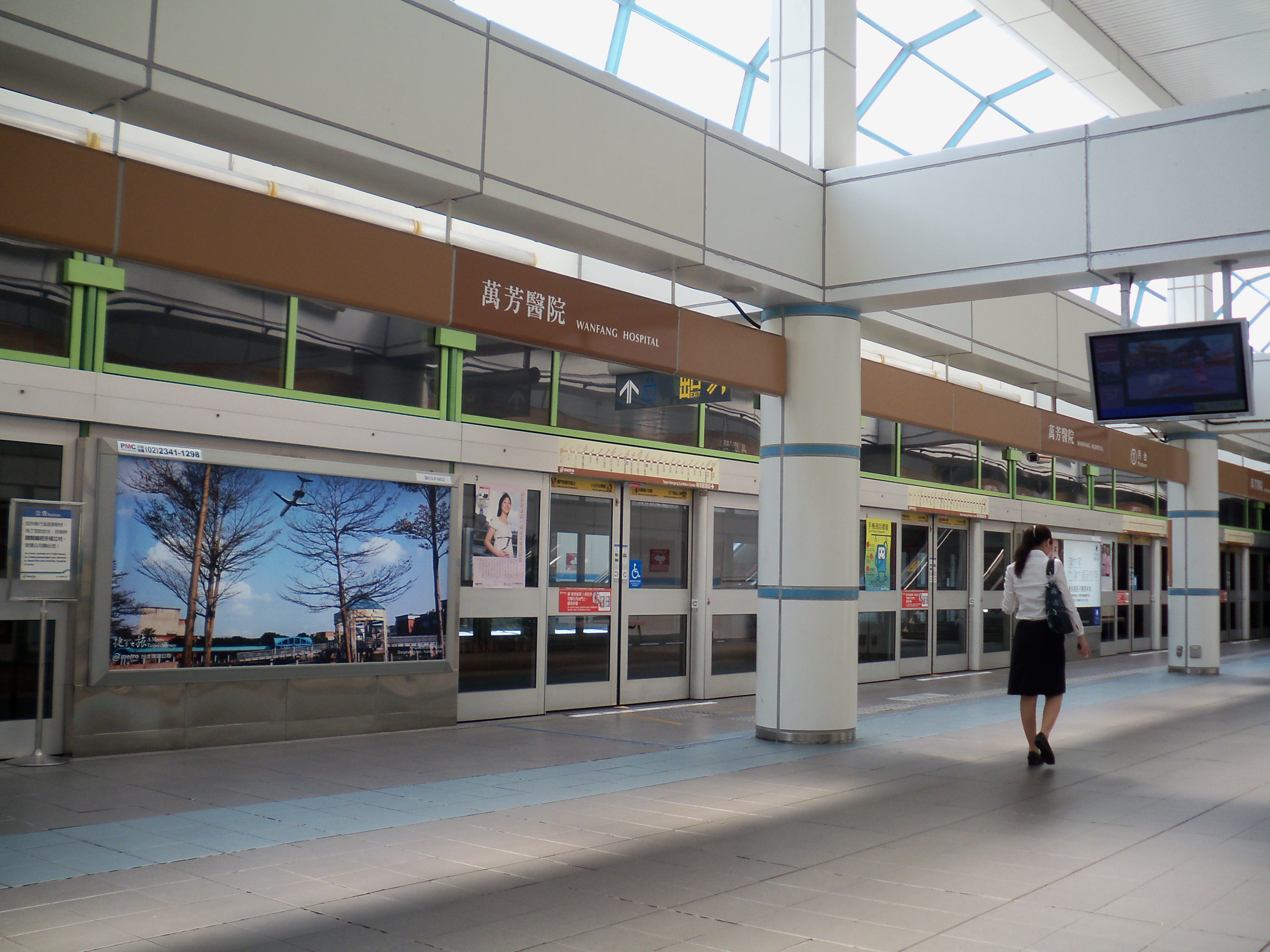
- Platform

Chinese name
- Traditional Chinese: 萬芳醫院
- Simplified Chinese: 万芳医院
Transcriptions
Standard Mandarin
- Hanyu Pinyin: Wànfāng Yīyuàn
- Bopomofo: ㄨㄢˋ ㄈㄤ ㄧ ㄩㄢˋ
- Wade–Giles: Wan⁴ fang yi yüan⁴
Hakka
- Pha̍k-fa-sṳ: Van-fông yî-yen

Alternative Chinese name
- Traditional Chinese: 萬芳病院
- Simplified Chinese: 万芳病院
Transcriptions
Southern Min
- Hokkien POJ: Bān-hong Pēⁿ-īⁿ
- Tâi-lô: Bān-hong Pīnn-īnn

General information
- Location: No. 113, Sec. 3, Xinglong Rd. Wenshan, Taipei; Taiwan
- Coordinates: 24.99938°N 121.55811°E
- System: Taipei Metro station
- Operator: Taipei Metro
- Line: Wenhu line
- Platforms: 2 side platforms
- Connections: Bus stop

Construction
- Structure type: Elevated

Other information
- Station code: BR04

History
- Opened: 28 March 1996; 30 years ago

Passengers
- 23,951 daily (December 2024)
- Rank: (Ranked 72 of 119)

Services
Preceding station	Taipei Metro	Following station
Wanfang Community towards Taipei Zoo	Wenhu line	Xinhai towards Nangang Exhib Center
Location

Wanfang Hospital station is a station on the Wenhu line of the Taipei Metro, located in Wenshan District, Taipei, Taiwan.

== Station overview ==
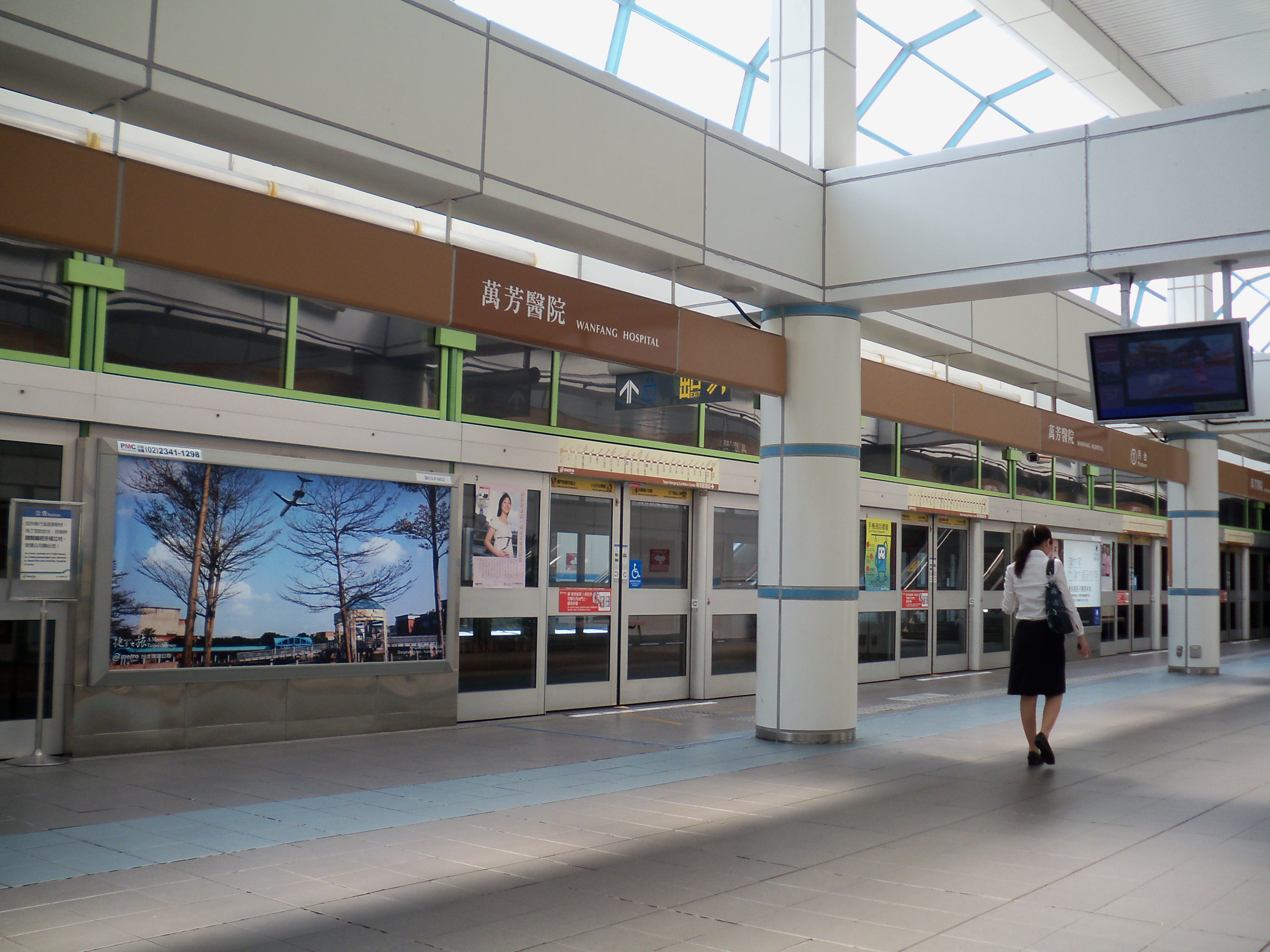
Wanfang Hospital station platform

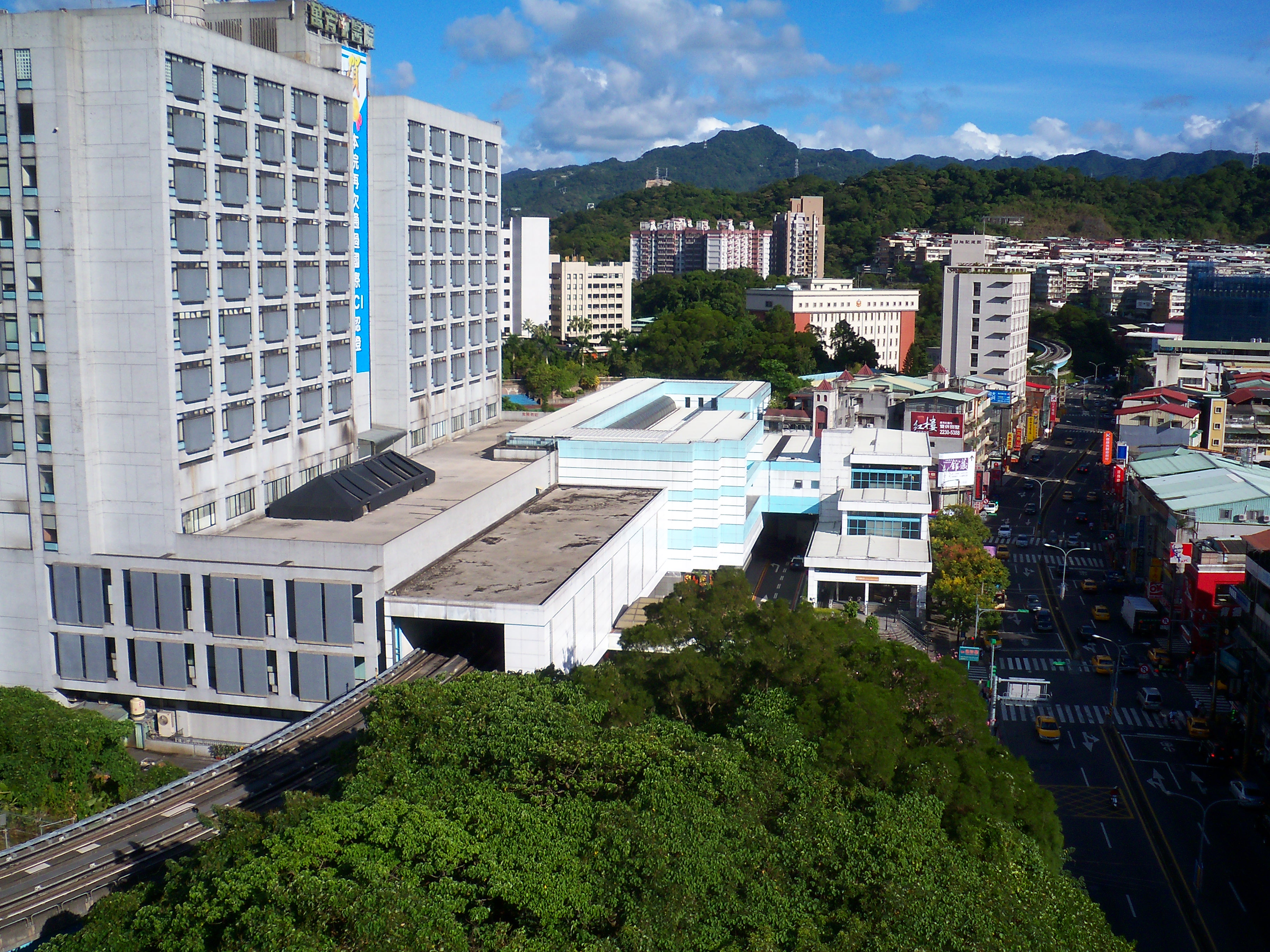
Wanfang Hospital station

The two-level, elevated station is connected to Wanfang Hospital. It has two side platforms and a single exit.

== Station layout ==
3F	Connecting level	Platforms-connecting overpass
2F
2F	Concourse
2F	Concourse	Lobby, information desk, automatic ticket dispensing machines, one-way faregates, restrooms
2F	Side platform, doors will open on the right
2F	Platform 1	← Wenhu line toward Taipei Nangang Exhibition Center (BR05 Xinhai)
2F	Platform 2	→ Wenhu line toward Taipei Zoo (BR03 Wanfang Community) →
2F	Side platform, doors will open on the right

1F	Street level	Exit/entrance

=== Exits ===
- Single exit: Xinlong Road, Sec. 4 (Wanfang Hospital)

== Around the station ==
- Taipei Municipal Wanfang Hospital
- China University of Technology
- Taiwan Police College
- Taipei Municipal Wanfang Senior High School
- Xinghua Elementary School
- Jingfu Community
