= Xinhai metro station =

Metro station in Taipei, Taiwan

Xinhai 辛亥
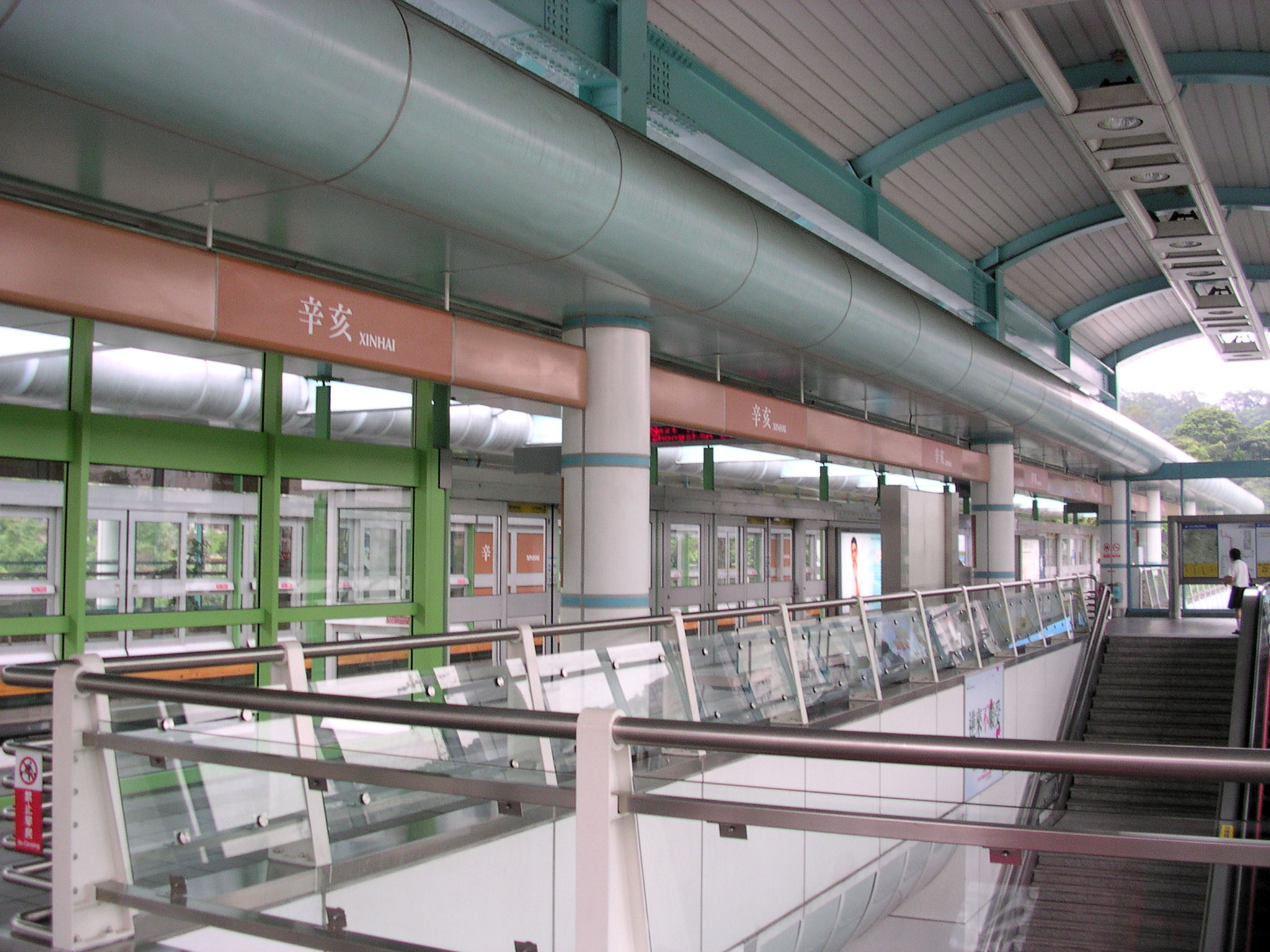
- Xinhai station platform

Chinese name
- Chinese: 辛亥
Transcriptions
Standard Mandarin
- Hanyu Pinyin: Xīnhài
- Bopomofo: ㄒㄧㄣ ㄏㄞˋ
Hakka
- Pha̍k-fa-sṳ: Sîn-hoi
Southern Min
- Tâi-lô: Sin-hāi

General information
- Location: No. 128, Sec. 4, Xinhai Rd. Wenshan, Taipei; Taiwan
- Coordinates: 25.005457°N 121.557069°E
- Operator: Taipei Metro
- Line: Wenhu line
- Connections: Bus stop

Construction
- Structure type: Elevated

Other information
- Station code: BR05

History
- Opened: 28 March 1996; 30 years ago

Passengers
- daily (December 2024)
- Rank: 10 out of 109 and 1 other

Services
Preceding station	Taipei Metro	Following station
Wanfang Hospital towards Taipei Zoo	Wenhu line	Linguang towards Nangang Exhib Center
Location

The Taipei Metro Xinhai station (formerly transliterated as Hsinhai Station until 2003) is a station on the Wenhu line located in Wenshan District, Taipei, Taiwan. It is named after the nearby Xinhai Elementary School and the Xinhai Revolution.

== Station overview ==
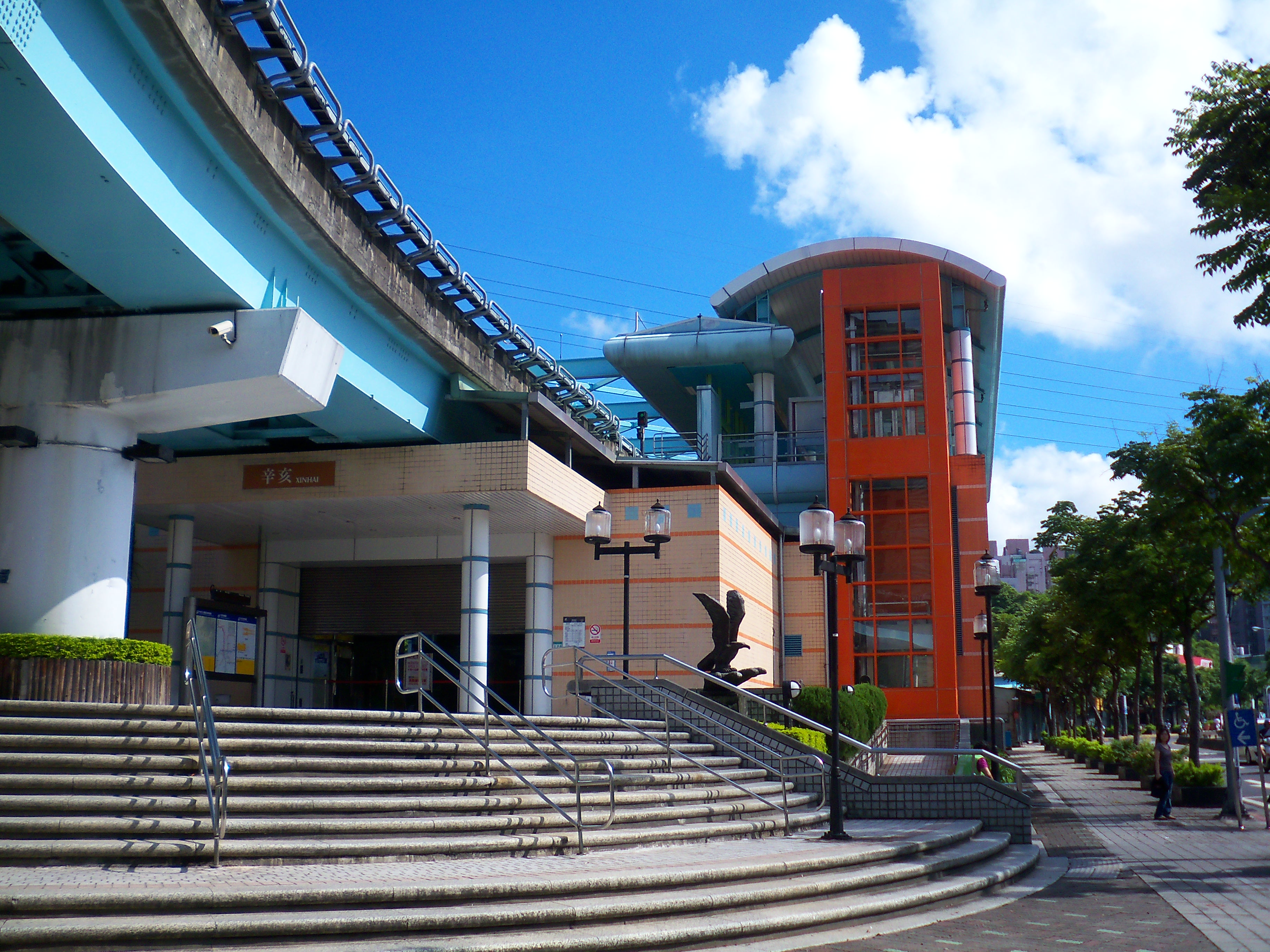
Xinhai station

This two-level, elevated station has two side platforms and a single exit.

== Station layout ==
2F
2F	Side platform, doors will open on the right
2F	Platform 1	← Wenhu line toward Taipei Nangang Exhibition Center (BR06 Linguang)
2F	Platform 2	→ Wenhu line toward Taipei Zoo (BR04 Wanfang Hospital) →
2F	Side platform, doors will open on the right

1F
1F	Concourse	Exit/entrance, lobby, information desk, automatic ticket dispensing machines, one-way faregates, restrooms

=== Exits ===
- Single exit: On Xinhai Rd., Sec. 4

== Around the station ==
- Xinhai Elementary School
- Dunnan Linyin Community
