= Muzha metro station =

Metro station in Taipei, Taiwan

Muzha 木柵
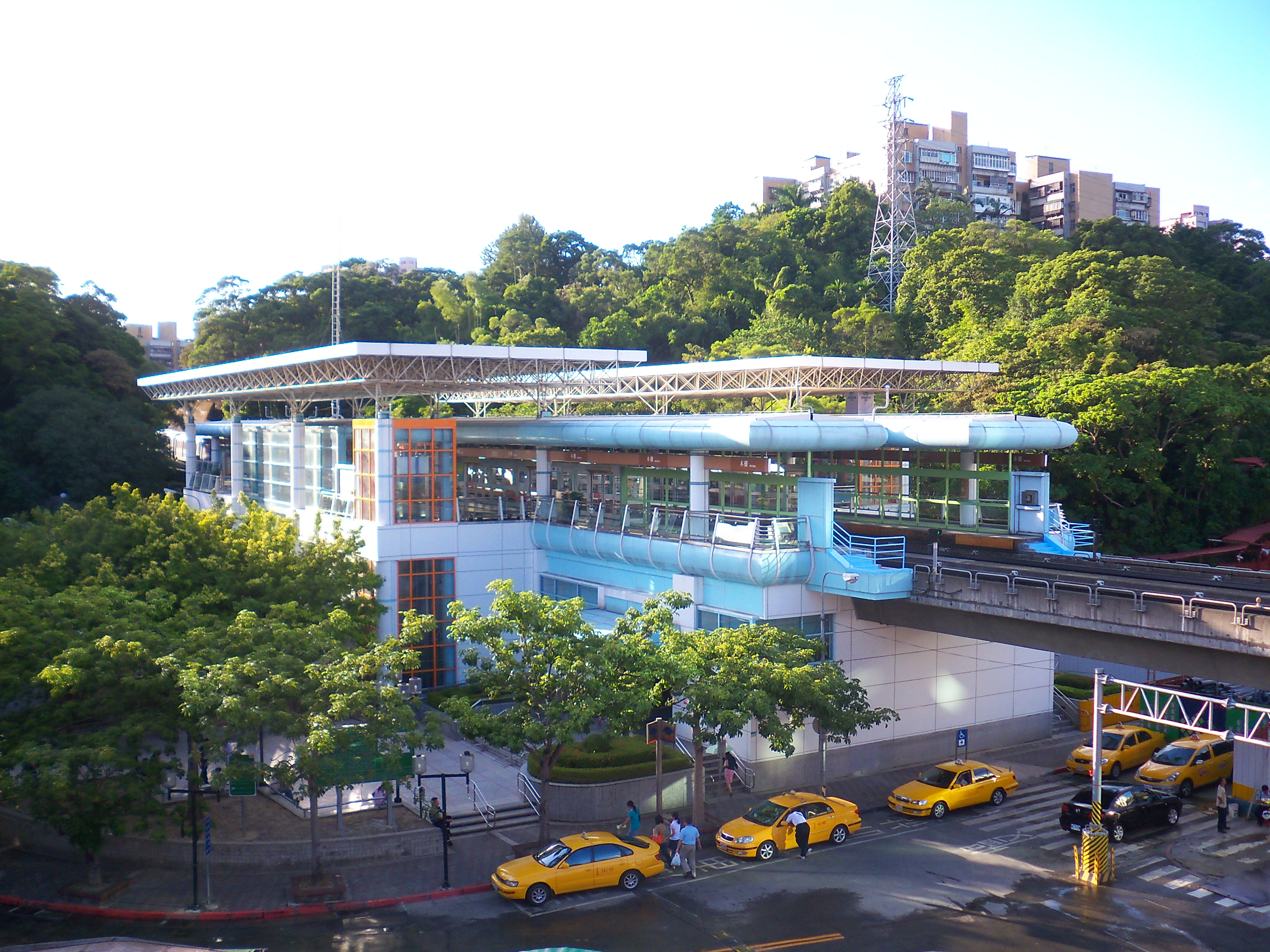
- Muzha station

Chinese name
- Traditional Chinese: 木柵
- Simplified Chinese: 木栅
- Literal meaning: Wooden fence
Transcriptions
Standard Mandarin
- Hanyu Pinyin: Mùzhà
- Bopomofo: ㄇㄨˋ ㄓㄚˋ
- Wade–Giles: Mu⁴-cha⁴
Hakka
- Pha̍k-fa-sṳ: Muk-chha̍k
Southern Min
- Tâi-lô: Ba̍k-sa

General information
- Location: No. 135, Sec. 4, Muzha Rd. Wenshan, Taipei; Taiwan
- Coordinates: 24.99823°N 121.573125°E
- System: Taipei Metro station
- Operator: Taipei Metro
- Line: Wenhu line
- Connections: Bus stop

Construction
- Structure type: Elevated

Other information
- Station code: BR02

History
- Opened: 28 March 1996; 30 years ago

Passengers
- 8,961 daily (December 2024)
- Rank: (Ranked 104 of 119)

Services
Preceding station	Taipei Metro	Following station
Taipei Zoo Terminus	Wenhu line	Wanfang Community towards Nangang Exhib Center
Location

Muzha station (formerly transliterated as Mucha Station until 2003) is a station on Wenhu line of the Taipei Metro, located in Wenshan District, Taipei, Taiwan.

== Station overview ==
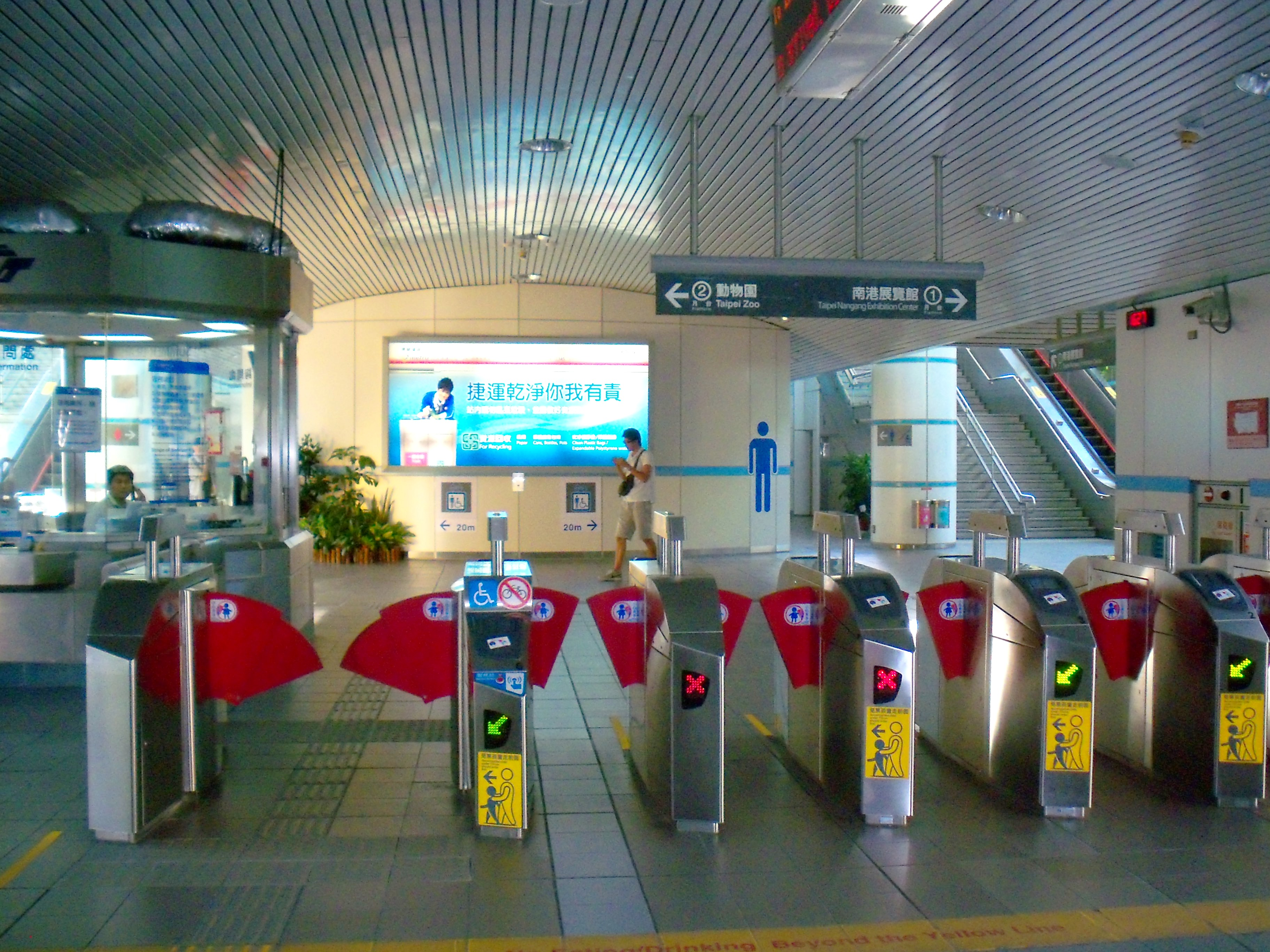
Muzha station concourse

This two-level, elevated station has two side platforms and a single exit. It is located between Muzha Rd. and Wanfang Rd., close to the intersection of Muzha Rd. and Jungong Rd.

The name of the station is known to cause ambiguity. Muzha is an area in Wenshan District, which may lead people to think that Muzha station is in Central Muzha. However, due to changes made during the planning of the Muzha line, the locations of several stations were changed, and Muzha station ended up being about 1 km away from central Muzha. This is also why the passenger volume of the station has always been low among the stations of the Taipei Metro.

== Station layout ==
2F
2F	Side platform, doors will open on the right
2F	Platform 1	← Wenhu line toward Taipei Nangang Exhibition Center (BR03 Wanfang Community)
2F	Platform 2	→ Wenhu line toward Taipei Zoo (BR01 Terminus) →
2F	Side platform, doors will open on the right

1F
1F	Concourse	Exit/entrance, lobby, information desk, automatic ticket dispensing machines, one-way faregates, restrooms

=== Exits ===
- Single exit: Muzha Rd (Sec. 4), Jungong Rd., Muzha Vocational High School

== Around the station ==
- Jungong Community
- Yuanye Sports Park
- Bojia Elementary School
- Bojia Sports Park
- Muzha Vocational High School
- Daonan Riverside Park
- Wenshan District Office
