= Liugongjun =

Irrigation system in Taipei, Taiwan

Coordinates: 24.9587°N 121.5367°E

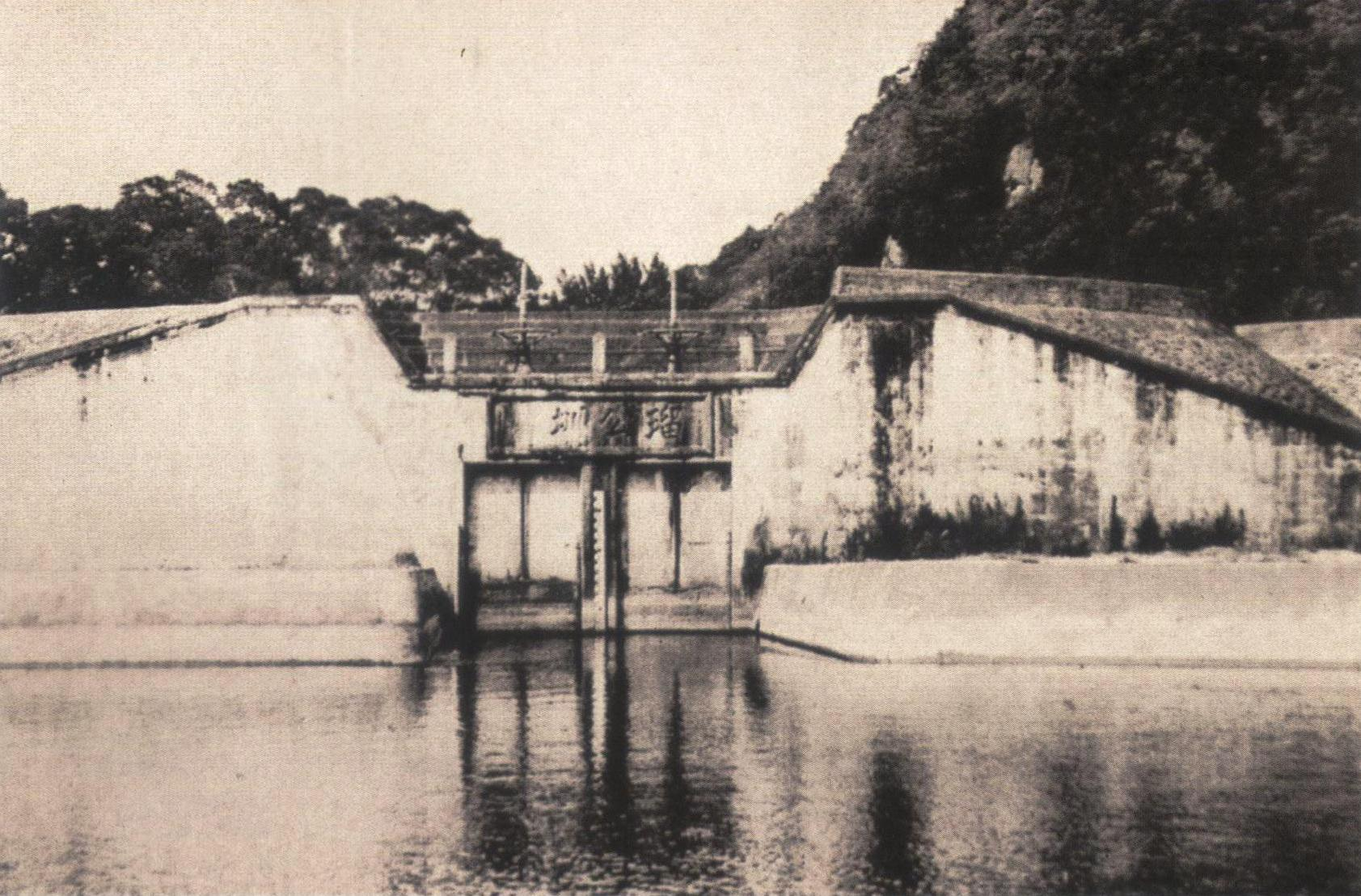
Water gate in 1934

Liugongzun (Chinese: 瑠公圳; pinyin: Liúgōngzùn; Wade–Giles: Liu^{2}-kung^{1}-tsun^{4}) is the name of a system of canals and irrigation ditches that once crisscrossed the city of Taipei, Taiwan. Most of the canals were covered over by roads and streets in the 1970s due to increasing volumes of traffic and diminishing necessity of water transportation and irrigation.

The canals ranged from wide, navigable waterways used for transportation to narrow ditches used primarily for irrigation and drainage. They ranged from the Keelung River in the north to the Wenshan District in the south of the city.

The waters of much of the Liugongzun canal system still flow beneath the city streets, and there remain a few spots where the canal is exposed and visible, most notably at the northern end of Xinsheng North Road. There have been recent proposals to daylight sections of the canal.
