= Jingmei Night Market =

Night market in Wenshan, Taipei, Taiwan

Jingmei Night Market 景美夜市
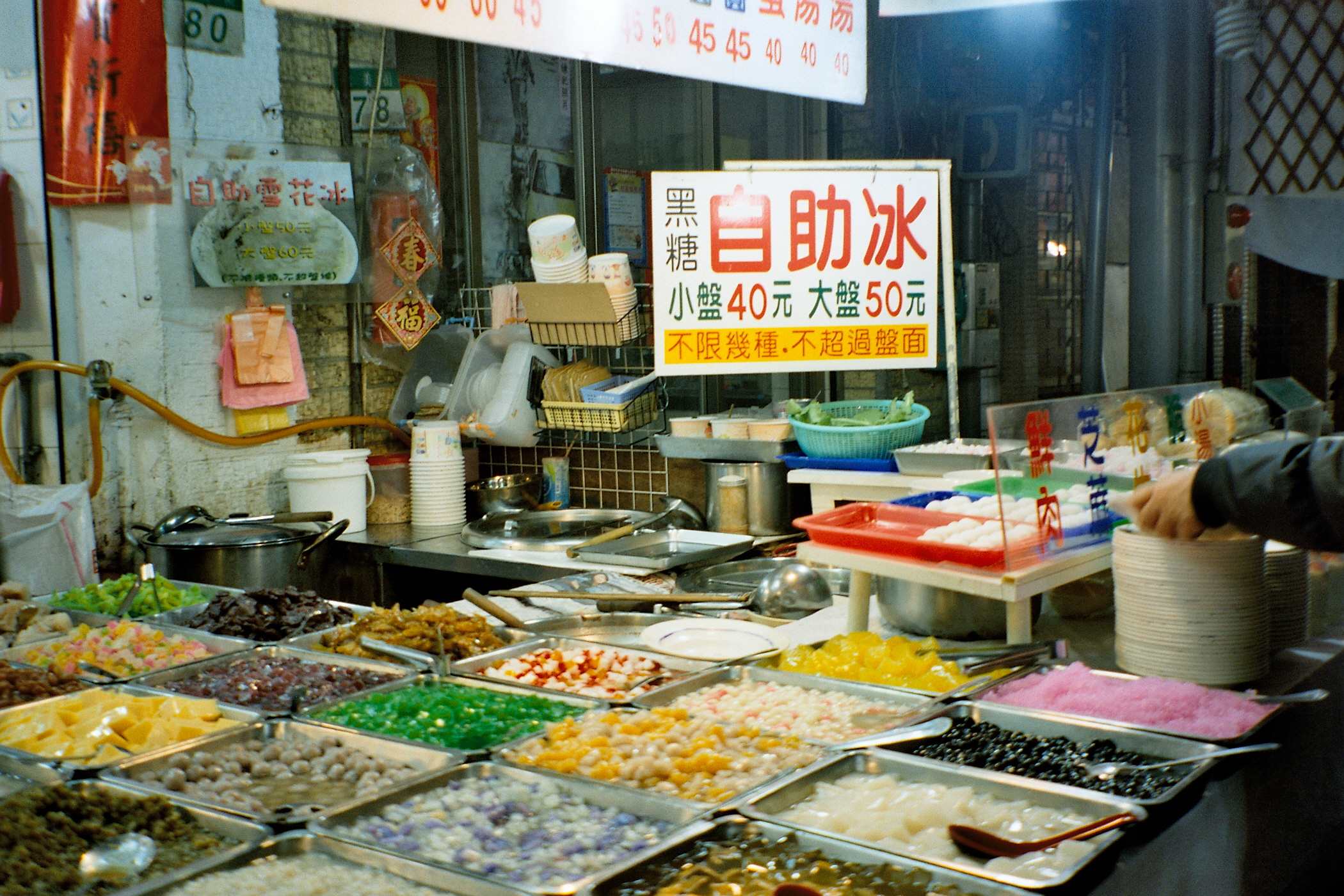
- Location: Wenshan, Taipei, Taiwan; 24°59′26.2″N 121°32′30.2″E
- Environment: night market
- Interactive map of Jingmei Night Market

The Jingmei Night Market (Chinese: 景美夜市; pinyin: Jǐngměi Yèshì) is a night market in Wenshan District, Taipei, Taiwan.

== Architecture ==
The night market spans from Muzha Road to Jingzhong Street. It is a densely packed market that functions as a wet market in the daytime. The market contains countless small stalls selling the usual night market suspects: fragrant food and affordable clothing. The temple part of the night market has been recently updated and renovated in 2023. However, some stalls offer unusual services, such as facials, body hair threading, knife massage, just to name a few. People who live nearby come and buy their groceries as well as delicacies for dinner. At night, Jingmei night market serves as a bustling and popular destination for middle and high school students, as well as families out for dinner and a good time.

== Opening Hours ==
The market is open from 4PM until midnight every day.

== Transportation ==
The night market is accessible by walking 300m (950ft) south of Exit 2 of the Jingmei Station of the Taipei Metro.

== Around the market ==
- Xianjiyan Trail (200m to the east)
- Jinghua Park (250m to the northeast)
- Jingxing Park (300m to the north)
- Jingmei Riverside Park (400m to the south)
- Xingfu Park (750m to the northeast)
- Shih Hsin University (900m to the south)

== See also ==
- Night markets in Taiwan
