= Jingmei metro station =

Metro station in Taipei, Taiwan

Jingmei 景美
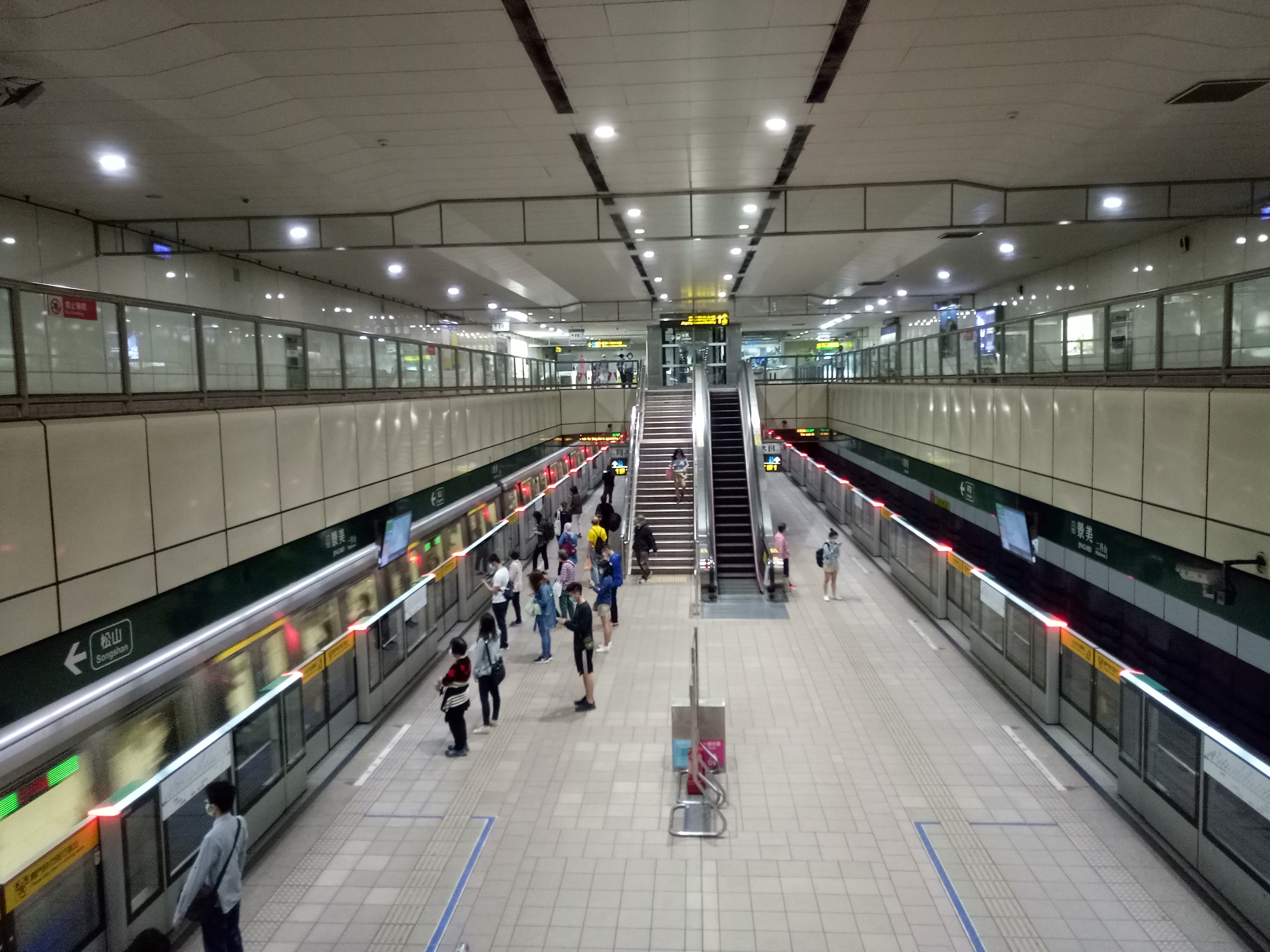
- Platform

Chinese name
- Chinese: 景美
Transcriptions
Standard Mandarin
- Hanyu Pinyin: Jǐngměi
- Bopomofo: ㄐㄧㄥˇㄇㄟˇ
- Wade–Giles: Ching³-mei³
Hakka
- Pha̍k-fa-sṳ: Kín-mî
Southern Min
- Tâi-lô: Kíng-bé (景尾)

General information
- Location: No. 393, Sec. 6, Roosevelt Rd. Wenshan, Taipei; Taiwan
- Coordinates: 24.992661°N 121.540622°E
- Operated by: Taipei Metro
- Line: Songshan–Xindian line
- Connections: Bus stop

Construction
- Structure type: Underground

Other information
- Station code: G05

History
- Opened: 11 November 1999; 26 years ago

Passengers
- daily (December 2024)
- Rank: 10 out of 109 and 1 other

Services
Preceding station	Taipei Metro	Following station
Wanlong towards Songshan	Songshan–Xindian line	Dapinglin towards Xindian
Location

The Taipei Metro Jingmei station (formerly transliterated as Chingmei Station until 2003) is located in Wenshan District, Taipei, Taiwan. It is on the Songshan–Xindian line.

== Station overview ==
This two-level, underground station has an island platform and three exits.

== Station layout ==
Street level	Exit/entrance	Exit/entrance
B1	Concourse	Lobby, toilets, one-way ticket machine, information desk
B2	Platform 1	← Songshan–Xindian line toward Songshan (G06 Wanlong)
B2	Island platform, doors will open on the left
B2	Platform 2	→ Songshan–Xindian line toward Xindian (G04 Dapinglin) →

== Around the station ==
- Jingmei Night Market
- Xianjiyan
- Shih Hsin University
- Jing-Mei White Terror Memorial Park

== See also ==
- Jingmei District
