= Shenkeng District =

District in New Taipei, Taiwan

Shenkeng 深坑區 Shinkō
- District
- Shenkeng District
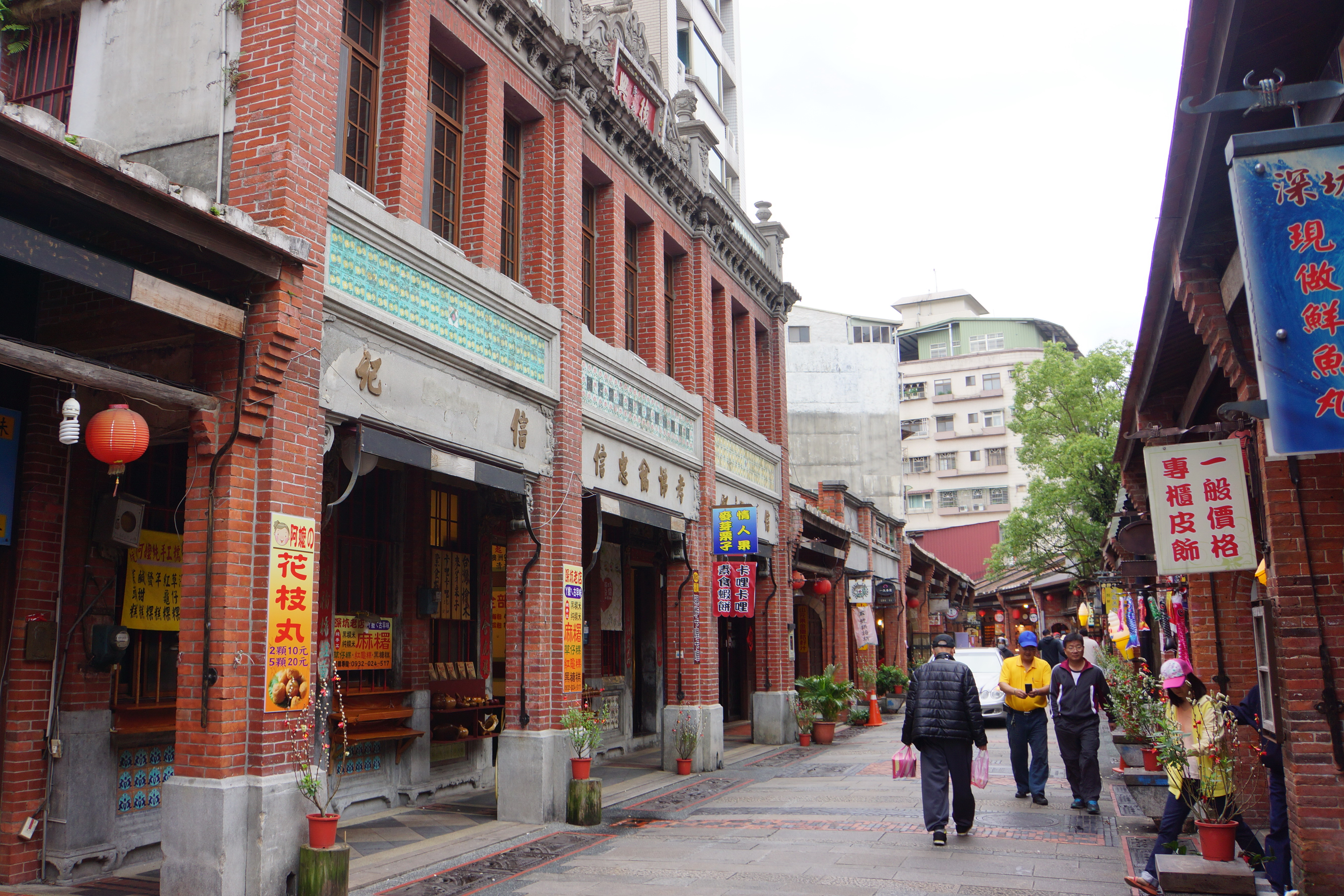
- Nickname: The Tofu Capital
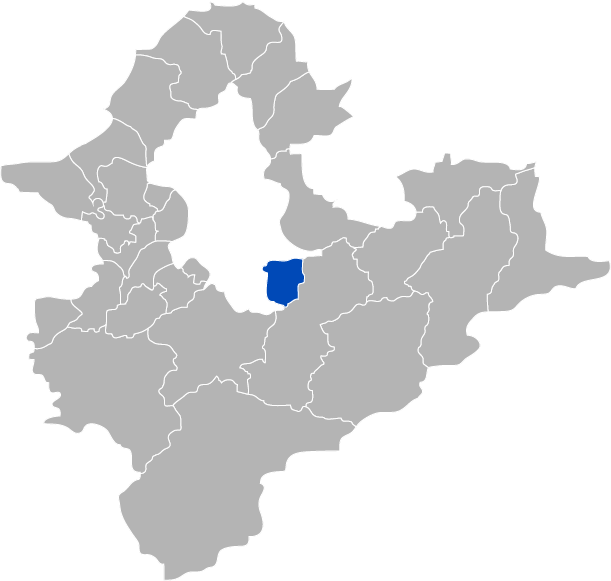
- Shenkeng District in New Taipei City
- Coordinates: 25°0′12″N 121°37′2″E
- Country: Republic of China (Taiwan)
- Special municipality: New Taipei City
- Urban villages (里): 8

Government
  - Mayor: Liu Hsin-Min (劉新民)

Area
  - Total: 20.58 km^{2} (7.95 sq mi)
- Highest elevation: 562 m (1,844 ft)
- Lowest elevation: 32 m (105 ft)

Population (February 2023)
  - Total: 23,631
  - Density: 1,148/km^{2} (2,974/sq mi)
- Time zone: UTC+8 (National Standard Time)
- Postal code: 222
- Area code: 02
- Website: www.shenkeng.ntpc.gov.tw (in Chinese)

Shenkeng
- Traditional Chinese: 深坑區
- Literal meaning: deep pit; deep mine
Transcriptions
Standard Mandarin
- Hanyu Pinyin: Shēnkēng Qū
- Bopomofo: ㄕㄣ ㄎㄥ ㄑㄩ
- Wade–Giles: Shên^{1}-k’êng^{1} Ch’ü^{1}
- Tongyong Pinyin: Shenkeng Cyu
Southern Min
- Hokkien POJ: Chhim-khiⁿ-khu / Chhim-kheⁿ-khu

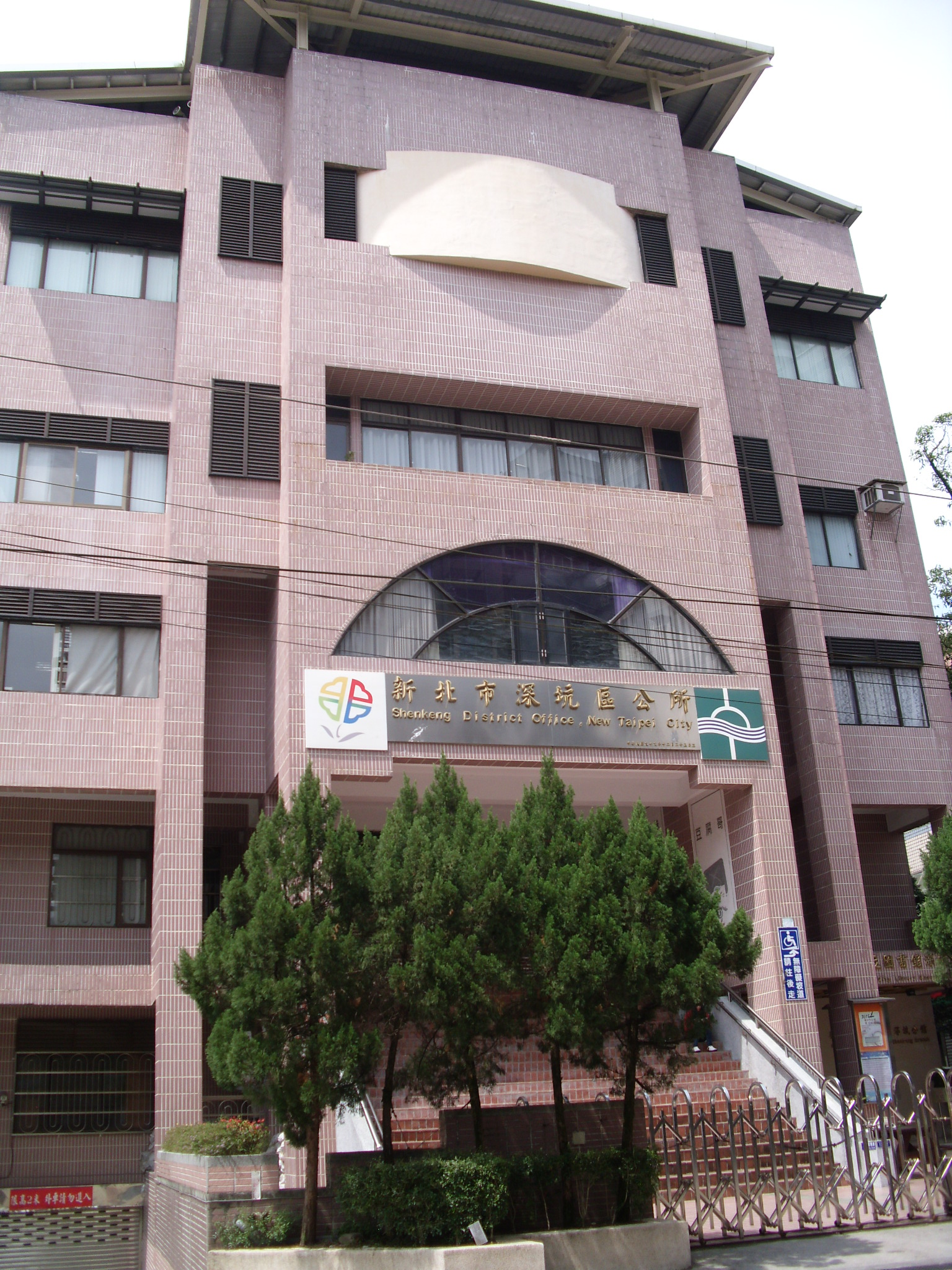
Shenkeng District office

Shenkeng District (Chinese: 深坑區; pinyin: Shēnkēng Qū; Pe̍h-ōe-jī: Chhim-khiⁿ-khu / Chhim-kheⁿ-khu) is a rural district in central New Taipei City in northern Taiwan. Formerly an agricultural and mining town, it is now famous for its numerous tofu restaurants and vendors.

== History ==
The area is first recorded as the preserve of a tribe of Pingpu aborigines during the Qing dynasty period in Taiwan. When Han Chinese farmers eventually moved in to develop the area, they bought the low-lying land from the aborigines and began cultivation in the main valley. The modern name of the township, Shenkeng, literally means deep pit or deep mine. The area used to have several active coal mines. The name has also been explained with reference to the mountains surrounding Shenkeng on all sides, which make the terrain similar to a pit.

On December 25, 2010, Shenkeng Township (深坑鄉) became Shenkeng District (深坑區).

== Geography ==
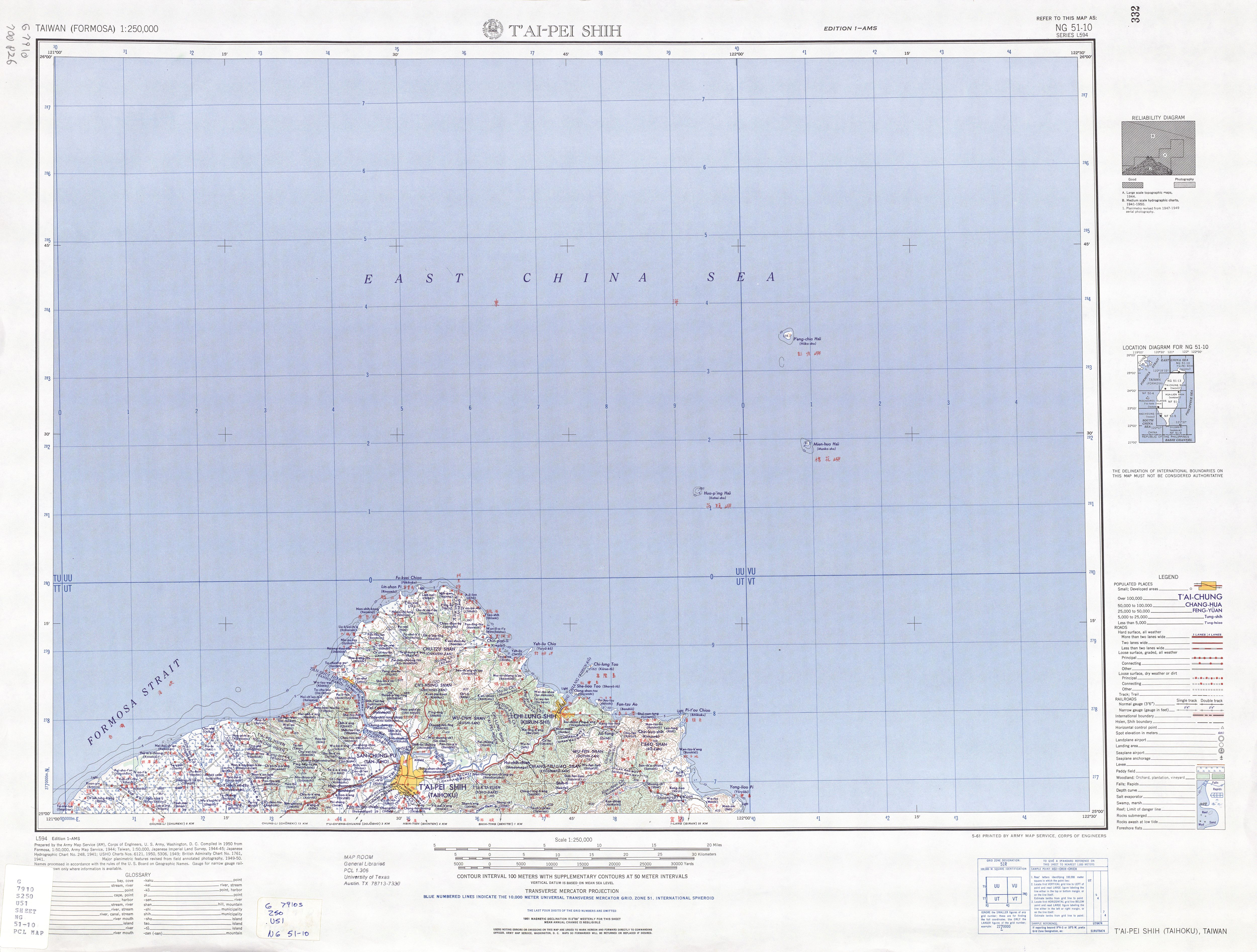
Map including Shenkeng (labeled as Shen-k’eng (Shinkō) 深坑) (1950)

Shenkeng is a rural district which borders Taipei City's Wenshan District to the west, Nangang District to the north, and the Shiding District of New Taipei City to the east.

== Politics and government ==
Politics in Shenkeng have largely been uneventful; the town is considered a safe seat for the Kuomintang. An exception was in 1996, when several members of the council were arrested on suspicion of connection with organised crime.

=== Administrative divisions ===
Shenkeng District includes eight urban villages:

- Shenkeng (深坑里), Puxin (埔新里), Wanshun (萬順里), Wanfu (萬福里), Tuku (土庫里), Laizhong (賴仲里), Arou (阿柔里), Shenggao (昇高里)

== Demographics ==
Historical population
| Year | Pop. | ±% |
|---|---|---|
| 2012 | 23,569 | — |
| 2013 | 23,622 | +0.2% |
| 2014 | 23,636 | +0.1% |
| 2015 | 23,594 | −0.2% |
| 2016 | 23,683 | +0.4% |
| 2017 | 23,660 | −0.1% |

In the years 2012 to 2017, the population of Shenkeng District hovered around 23,600 with a steadily ageing population.

== Education ==
Shenkeng is home to Tungnan University, a private technical university. There is also a Junior High School and an Elementary School in the town.

== Tourist attractions ==
The economy of Shenkeng is centred on tourism, and that tourism is based largely on tofu. The district is sufficiently well known in culinary circles that it has been a subject of media interest in Japan and Hong Kong. The tofu from Shenkeng has an unusual ratio of soybean to gypsum, giving it a yellowish colour and distinctive flavour. The town has become so readily identified with tofu that it has earned the epithet "The Tofu Capital".

There are also extensive hiking trails, some of which were in use during the Japanese era by anti-Japanese guerilla fighters.

- Shenkeng Old Street

== Transportation ==
Transportation in Shenkeng is limited to roads only; there is as yet no railway or mass transit service, although proposals have been made to extend the Wenshan Line of the Taipei Metro into Shenkeng. Three bus companies offer passenger services within Shenkeng and between Shenkeng and surrounding settlements.

== See also ==
- New Taipei City
