= Wenshan District =

District in Taipei, Taiwan

Coordinates: 24°59′23″N 121°34′20″E

Wenshan 文山區 Wunshan
- District
- Wenshan District
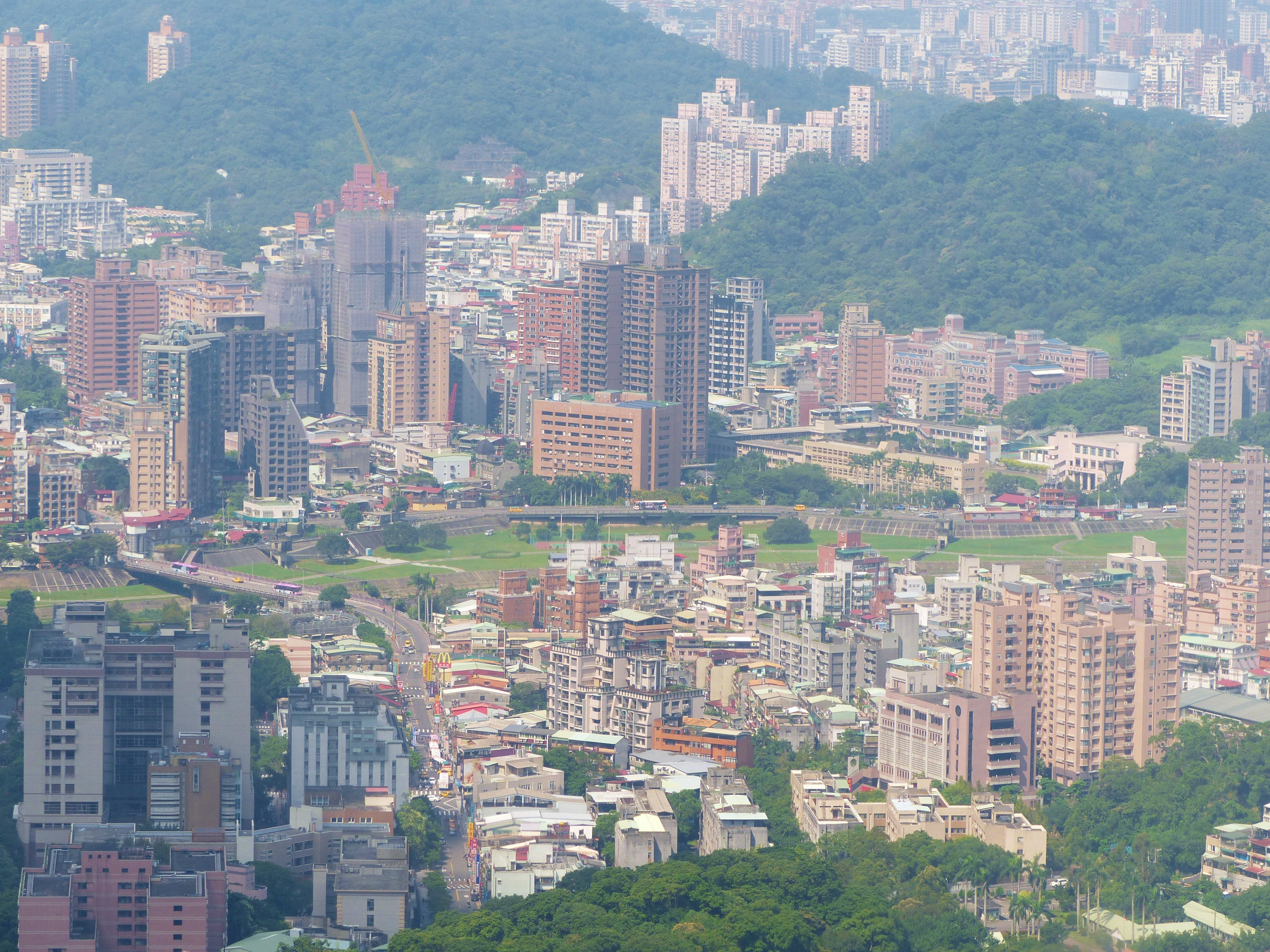

- Country: Republic of China (Taiwan)
- Region: Southern Taipei
- Divisions: List: 43 villages; 997 neighborhoods

Area
  - Total: 31.5090 km^{2} (12.1657 sq mi)
  - Rank: Ranked 4th of 12

Population (January 2023)
  - Total: 258,279
  - Rank: Ranked 4th of 12
  - Density: 8,196.99/km^{2} (21,230.1/sq mi)
- Postal code: 116
- Website: wsdo.gov.taipei (in Chinese)

Wenshan District
- Traditional Chinese: 文山區
Transcriptions
Standard Mandarin
- Hanyu Pinyin: Wénshān Qū
- Wade–Giles: Wen-shan Chü
Southern Min
- Hokkien POJ: Bûn-san-khu

Jingmei (old name)
- Traditional Chinese: 景美
Transcriptions
Southern Min
- Hokkien POJ: Kéng-bóe / Kéng-bé

Muzha (old name)
- Traditional Chinese: 木柵
Transcriptions
Southern Min
- Hokkien POJ: Ba̍k-sa

Wenshan District (Chinese: 文山區; pinyin: Wénshān Qū) is a district in Taipei, Taiwan. It is the southernmost district of the twelve districts in Taipei. Wenshan previously referred to the region south of the Taipei Basin (including Xindian and Pinglin).

== History ==
In 1894 (late Qing era), the local gentry changed the name from "Fist Mountain" (拳山) to the more elegant "Fort Wenshan" (文山堡, from 文山秀氣). The greater Wenshan area (大文山區) is roughly the area of Bunsan District (文山郡), Taihoku Prefecture from the Japanese era. It included modern Wenshan district as well as Xindian, Shenkeng, Shiding, Pinglin, and Wulai.

=== Republic of China ===
After the handover of Taiwan from Japan to the Republic of China in 1945, the government divided the region into three areas, which are Jingmei, Muzha and Shenkeng on 1 March 1950. On 1 July 1968, Jingmei and Muzha townships were reassigned to Taipei City from Taipei County and later combined to become Wenshan District on 12 March 1990.

== Geography ==
Wenshan District is surrounded by mountains on three sides, separating it from nearby areas in Taipei and New Taipei. The Jingmei River and Xindian River run respectively along the south and west of Wenshan District.

Wenshan District is bordered to the north by Zhongzheng, Daan, Xinyi, and Nangang Districts in Taipei City. Wenshan District is bordered to the east and south by New Taipei City's Shenkeng and Xindian Districts, respectively. To the west across the Xindian River are Yonghe and Zhonghe Districts, also in New Taipei City.

== Culture ==
Notable attractions in this district include the Zhinan Temple (指南宮), Taipei Zoo, Maokong, Jingmei Night Market, Xianji Rock (仙跡岩) and Fudekeng Environmental Restoration Park. The Examination Yuan and the National Chengchi University are also located in this district.

The Brown Line, Green Line, and Maokong Gondola serve this district. There are 10 transit stations located in Wenshan District: Xinhai, Wanfang Hospital, Wanfang Community, Muzha, and Taipei Zoo on the Brown Line, Wanlong and Jingmei on the Green Line, and Taipei Zoo South, Zhinan Temple Station, and Maokong on the Maokong Gondola.

Wenshan District also contains the city mayor's residence.

== Government institutions ==
- Coast Guard Administration
- Examination Yuan

== Education ==
- National Chengchi University
- Taiwan Police College
- Taipei Municipal Muzha Vocational High School
- Taipei Jingmei Girls High School
- Taipei Municipal Wanfang Senior High School

== Infrastructure ==
- Muzha Refuse Incineration Plant

== Transportation ==
The district is served by the following stations of the Taipei Metro:

- Taipei Zoo station
- Muzha metro station
- Wanfang Community metro station
- Wanfang Hospital metro station
- Xinhai metro station
- Jingmei metro station
- Wanlong metro station

Additionally, the following may also be reached from Wenshan District:

- Maokong Gondola
- Formosa Freeway, Nat'l Hwy no.3
  - Muzha Interchange at 20 km
- Taipei connection line
  - 萬芳交流道 (3)
  - 木柵交流道 (5)
- Tai 9 line (Beixin Road), County Road 106 (Muzha Road)
- Xinyi Expressway

== See also ==
- District (Taiwan)
