= Waste management in Taiwan =

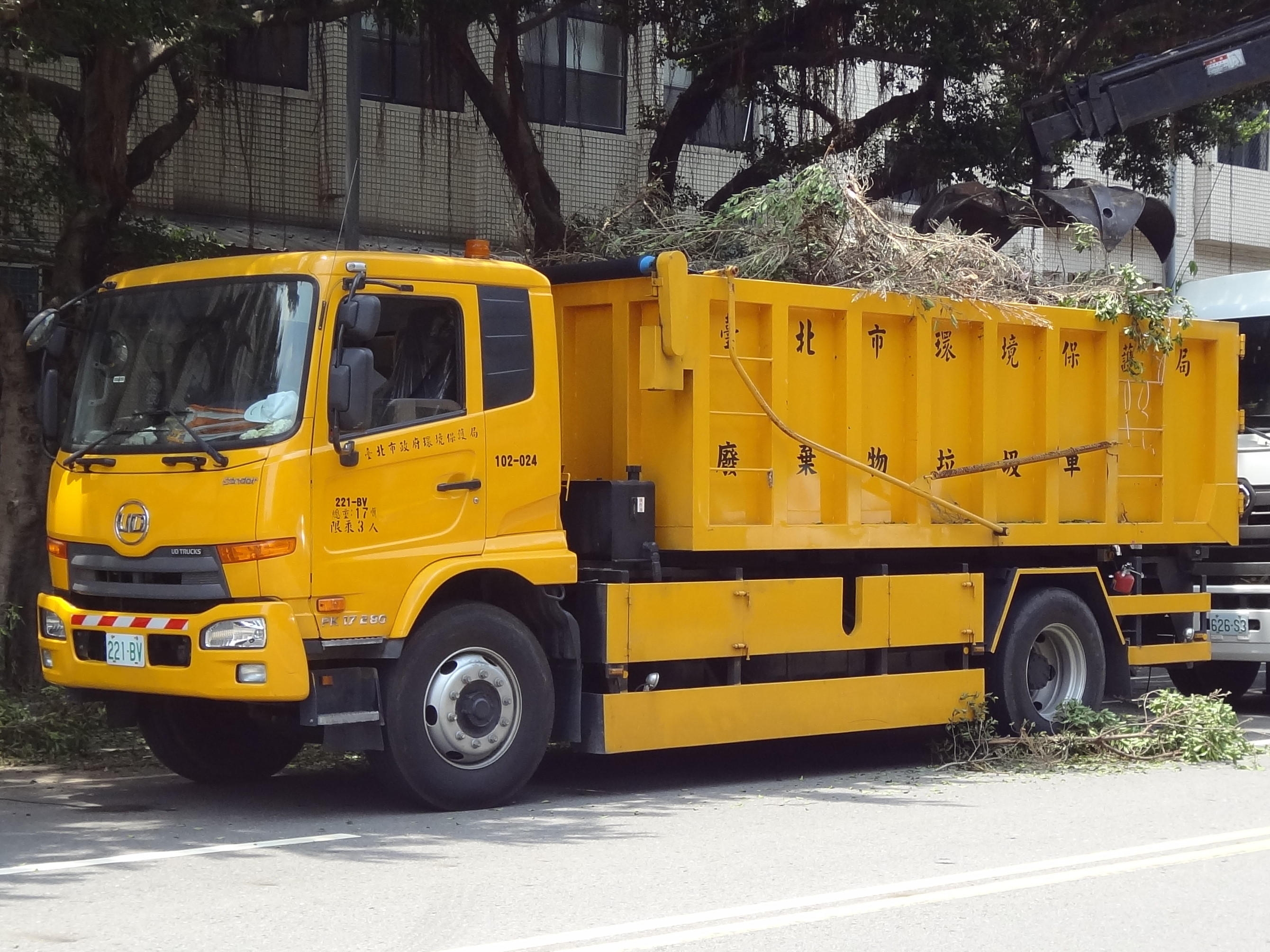
Waste collection truck of Taipei City Government's Department of Environmental Protection

Waste management in Taiwan refers to the management and disposal of waste in Taiwan. It is regulated by the Department of Waste Management of the Ministry of Environment of the Executive Yuan.

== History ==
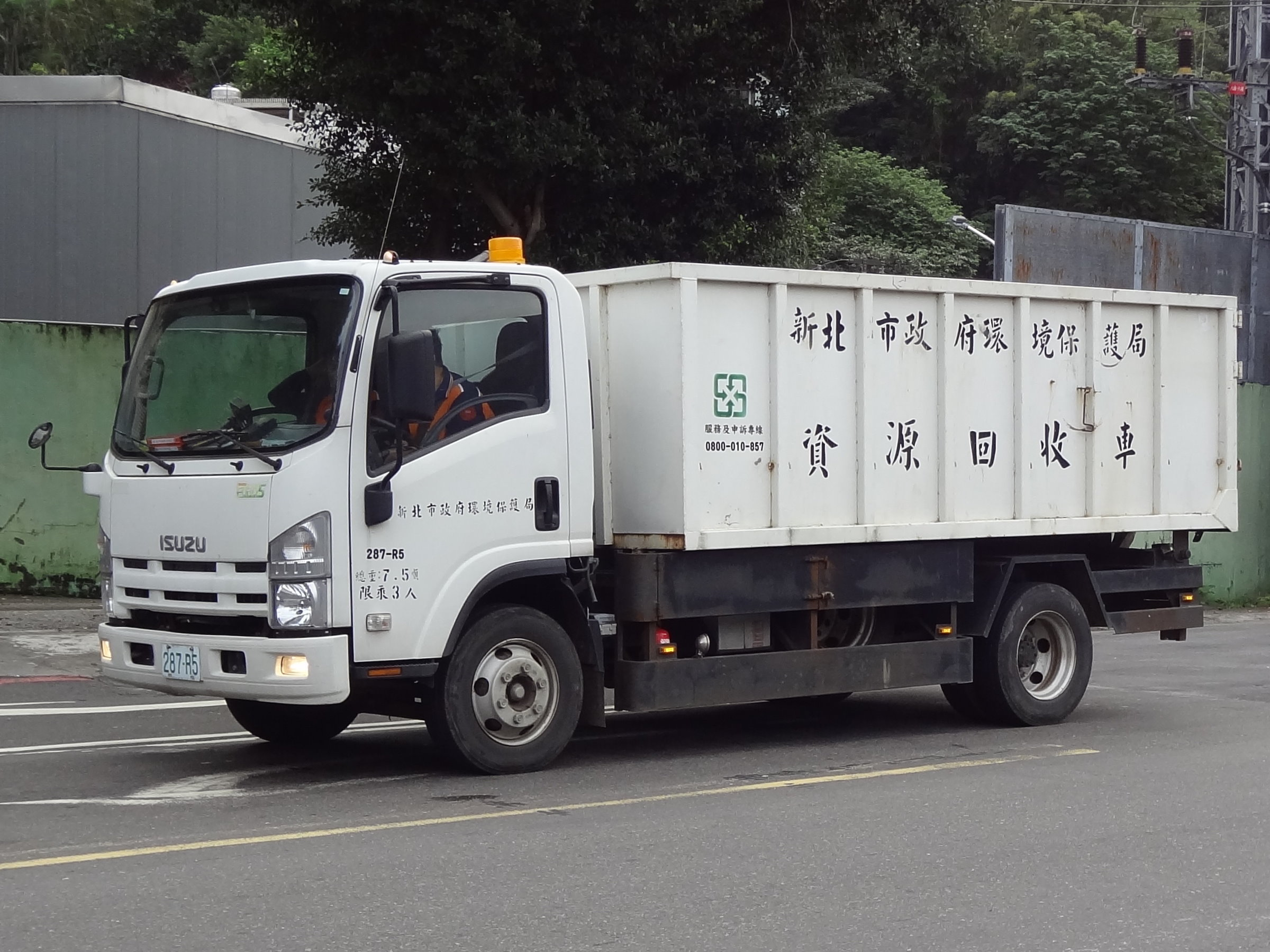
Recycling truck of New Taipei City Government's Department of Environmental Protection

Waste management was not centrally regulated during the early years of Meiji era Japan. In 1900, the Sewage Disposal Law, the Waste Cleaning Act, and the Dirt Removal Law were enacted. The legislation was aimed at improving sanitation in Japanese cities and made waste disposal a municipal responsibility. At the time, Taiwan was a territory of Japan.

Under the Republic of China, Taiwan began to industrialize by the 1950s and 1960s. In the following decades, industrialization occurred more rapidly, leading to a higher waste output. Taiwan then became known as the Garbage Island. To combat increased levels of waste, a recycling program began in 1989, following a 1987 amendment to the Waste Disposal Act. Recycling in Taiwan started as a private effort, but the initiative soon became overrun with fraud and other scandals due to ineffective government regulation. The private organizations and industries in charge of the program were free to falsely report recycling rates.The government established the 3R Foundation (reduce, reuse, recycle) in 1994 to discourage instances of fraud and other scandals. Recyclables were reclassified into eight groups: containers, tires, pesticide containers, lubricant oil, lead-acid batteries, vehicles, home appliances, and communication products. Each of these materials were the responsibility of one commission, and the commissions themselves were overseen by the Environmental Protection Administration. The eight separate committees initially established by recyclable material were eventually merged into the Resource Recycling Fund Management Committee. General oversight of the recycling program has been placed under the purview of the Resource Recycling Fund Management Committee, but a separate committee handles the establishment of recycling fees, and another committee is called on to periodically audit the recycling program itself.

== Waste collection and disposal ==
Taiwan's limited space to build trash incinerators and landfills were recognized as a problem, but from the 1980s and as late as 1996, waste was freely placed in the streets for collection. At the time, Taiwan had five incinerators in operation; at full capacity, only 10% of annual combustible waste was disposed of via incineration. Other methods of garbage disposal placed a large amount of stress on existing landfills. In 1997, the Environmental Protection Administration tracked the usage of 316 landfills. Of these landfills, 82 were full and another 55 were closed during that year because they were too close to rivers.

In the 1990s, the government began enforcing waste sorting procedures. People are responsible for bringing their own trash to the collection point. In some areas such as Taipei City, nonrecyclables must be collected in colour-coded bags that can be bought at convenience stores. Raw food waste is processed to be further used as fertilizer by farmers. Cooked food waste is processed to be further turned into food for livestock. Not all recyclables are collected daily; the most common recyclables have a specially designated pickup day. There are 33 items considered recyclable, which in turn fall into 13 categories.

Garbage collection trucks are known to play music to alert people of their presence at collection points. Songs played include Tekla Bądarzewska-Baranowska's "Maiden's Prayer" and Ludwig van Beethoven's "Für Elise." Starting in 2003, recycling trucks played Hou Dejian's composition, "Any Empty Wine Bottles for Sale?" as first recorded by Su Rui for the 1983 film Papa, Can You Hear Me Sing. Trucks picking up waste from indigenous areas play indigenous folk tunes. Christmas music is played during Christmas, and at Chinese New Year, recordings of Chinese traditional tunes play. Local governments have occasionally changed the garbage collection song. Other prerecorded tracks played on the trucks include short English-language lessons.

== Power generation ==
In 2016, 76.8% of fly ash from coal-fired power plants in Taiwan were reused in the construction areas, totaling to 1.703 million tons. Any remaining industrial waste from power generation industries, such as wire, cables and scrap were reused by waste disposal contractors through open bidding process. In 2016, there was 4,950 tons of such waste sold, which generated a revenue of NT$533 million.

== Recycling facilities ==
=== Incinerators ===
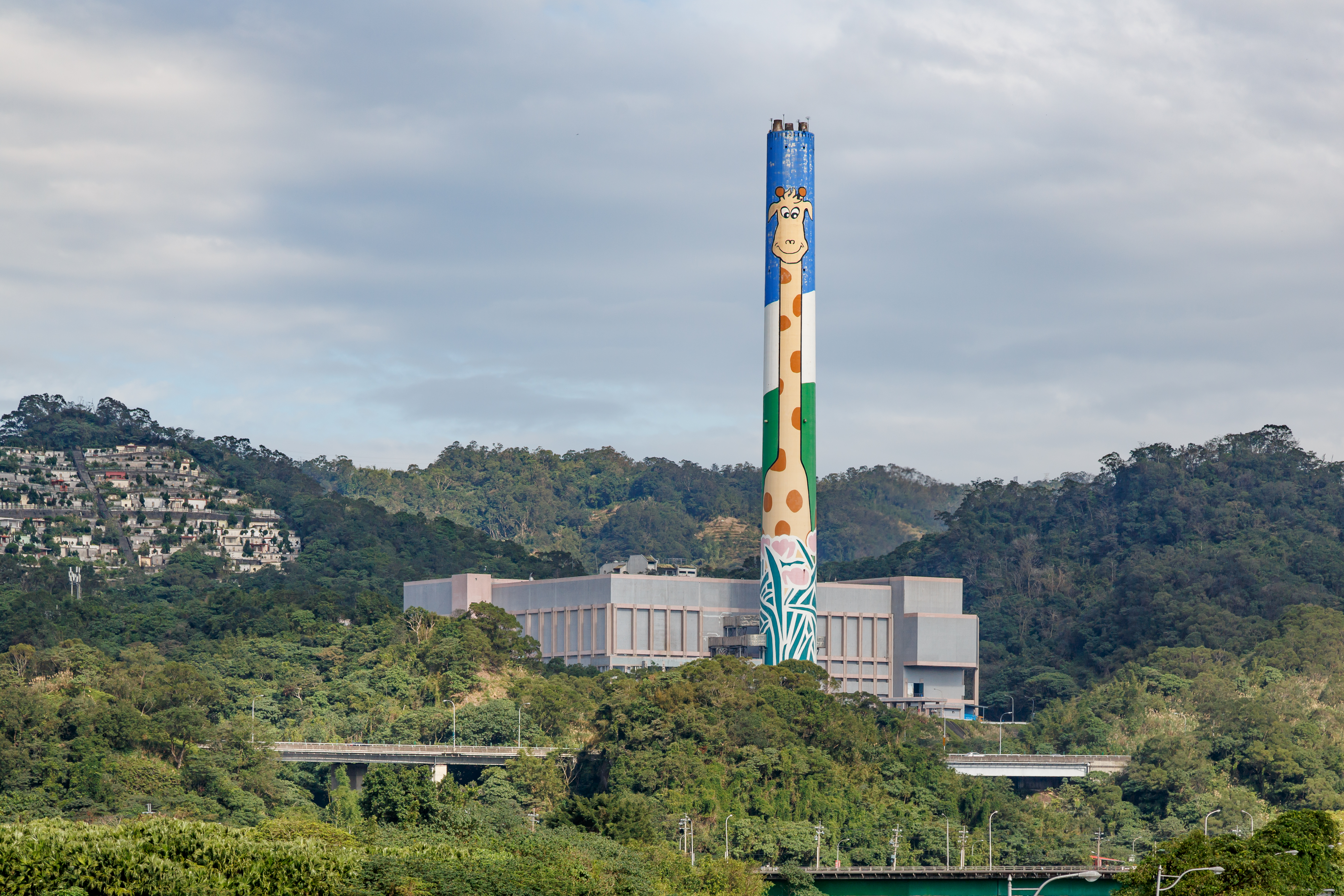
Muzha Refuse Incineration Plant in Taipei.

As of August 2023, there are currently 25 large-scale waste incineration plants in operation. Among them, 22 plants are publicly owned with 5 publicly operated and 17 privately operated. The remaining three plants are privately owned and operated.

Facility	City	Capacity	Electric Power Output	Height of smokestack	Year opened	Coordinates	Remarks
Beitou	Taipei	1800 tons/d	48 MW	150 m	1999	25°06′29″N 121°29′58″E	chimney with observation deck and restaurant
Neihu	Taipei	900 tons/d	144 MW	73 m	1991	25°03′47″N 121°36′20″E	
Muzha	Taipei	1200 tons/d	13.5 MW	147 m	1994	25°00′18″N 121°35′16″E	
Bali	New Taipei City	1350 tons/d	35.7 MW	150.5 m	2001	25°08′03″N 121°22′04″E	
Shulin	New Taipei City	450 tons/d	22.3 MW	118 m	1995	24°58′02″N 121°22′48″E	
Xindian	New Taipei City	900 tons/d	14.6 MW	120 m	1994	24°57′29″N 121°29′50″E	
Keelung	Keelung	600 tons/d	15.8 MW	100 m	2005	25°07′22″N 121°46′32″E	
Lize	Yilan County	600 tons/d	14.7 MW	120 m	2005	24°39′40″N 121°50′08″E	
Taoyuan	Taoyuan	1350 tons/d	35.1 MW	80 m	2001	24°59′32″N 121°14′59″E	
Hsinchu City	Hsinchu City	900 tons/d	23.7 MW	67 m	2000	24°50′03″N 120°54′59″E	
Miaoli	Miaoli County	500 tons/d	11.8 MW	70 m		24°40′24″N 120°50′09″E	
Taichung	Taichung	900 tons/d	26.2 MW	120 m	1995	24°09′10″N 120°35′53″E	
Houli	Taichung	900 tons/d	26.2 MW	120 m	2000	24°17′16″N 120°41′50″E	
Wujih	Taichung	900 tons/d		100 m	2004	24°05′46″N 120°37′11″E	
His-Chou	Changhua County	900 tons/d	22.6 MW	118.3 m	2000	23°49′35″N 120°27′37″E	
Linnei	Yulin County	300 tons/d			2005	23°46′46″N 120°36′12″E	Never started operation due to corruption case against former magistrate of Yunlin County
Chiayi	Chiayi City	300 tons/d	2.4 MW	68 m	1998	23°26′39″N 120°26′29″E	
Lutsao	Chiayi County	900 tons/d		120 m	2001	23°26′57″N 120°16′49″E	
Taitung	Taitung County	300 tons/d			2005	22°43′52″N 121°08′09″E	
Chengxi	Tainan	900 tons/d	14.3 MW	124 m	1999	23°02′44″N 120°04′28″E	
Yongkang	Tainan	900 tons/d	22.5 MW	100 m	2008	23°02′22″N 120°16′59″E	
Renwu	Kaohsiung	1350 tons/d	150 MW	118.8 m	2000	22°41′59″N 120°22′08″E	
Gangshan	Kaohsiung	1350 tons/d	38 MW	60 m	2001	22°48′39″N 120°16′13″E	
Kaohsiung Central	Kaohsiung	900 tons/d	25.5 MW	100 m	1999	22°39′54″N 120°19′53″E	
Kaohsiung South	Kaohsiung	1800 tons/d	49 MW	87.6 m	2000	22°32′58″N 120°22′38″E	
Kanting	Pingtung County	900 tons/d	22.5 MW	100 m	2000	22°29′59″N 120°29′55″E	
