= Renwu Refuse Incineration Plant =

Incinerator in Renwu, Kaohsiung, Taiwan

Renwu Refuse Incineration Plant 仁武垃圾焚化廠
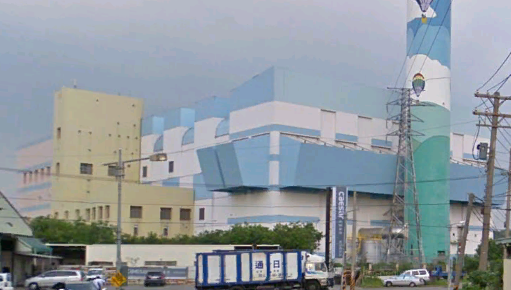
- Built: February 2000
- Location: Renwu, Kaohsiung, Taiwan
- Coordinates: 22°41′59.5″N 120°22′9.9″E
- Industry: waste management
- Products: processed waste, electricity
- Style: incinerator
- Volume: 1,350 tons of garbage per day

The Renwu Refuse Incineration Plant (traditional Chinese: 仁武垃圾焚化廠; simplified Chinese: 仁武垃圾焚化厂; pinyin: Rénwǔ Lèsè Fénhuà Chǎng) is an incinerator in Renwu District, Kaohsiung, Taiwan.

== History ==
The construction of the plant was completed in February 2000 led by Mitsubishi Heavy Industries and CTCI Corporation. In December 2012, the plant implemented a computerized maintenance management system. The project started in January 2013 and went online in September later that year.

== Technical details ==
The plant can treat 1,350 tons of garbage per day and produce 809 MWh of electricity per day. Its operation is run by Swire SITA Waste Services. As of 2020, it received a total of 35,430 tons of garbage annually and incinerated 36,887 tons of them.

== See also ==
- Air pollution in Taiwan
- Waste management in Taiwan
