= Taitung Incinerator =

Incinerator in Taitung City, Taitung County, Taiwan

Taitung Incinerator 臺東垃圾焚化廠
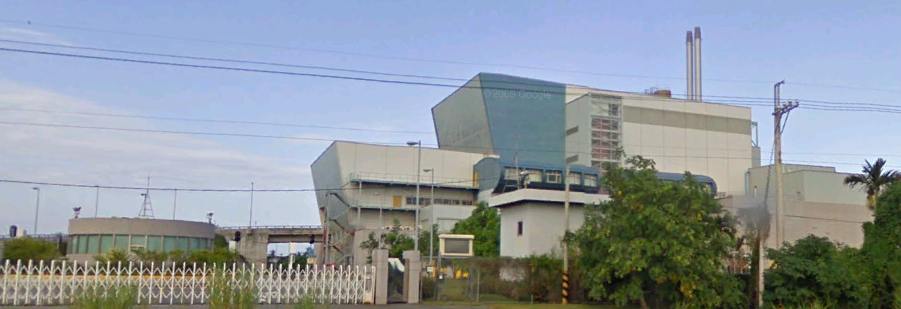
- Built: 2006
- Operated: June 2022 (planned)
- Location: Taitung City, Taitung County, Taiwan
- Coordinates: 22°43′54.0″N 121°08′08.0″E
- Industry: waste management
- Style: incinerator

The Taitung Incinerator (traditional Chinese: 臺東垃圾焚化廠; simplified Chinese: 台东垃圾焚化厂; pinyin: Táidōng Lèsè Fénhuà Chǎng) is an incinerator in Taitung City, Taitung County, Taiwan.

== History ==
The construction of the incinerator began in 2001. The construction was completed five years later in 2006 and trial operation started afterwards. However, the Taitung County Government soon refuse to approve the land where the incinerator stands to be used for it to become operational. In 2011, legal case arises between the incinerator contractor and the county government, resulting the county government to buy back the plant and the land for NT$1.96 billion. Soon later, the county government decided to relaunch the incinerator. On 15 February 2022, the county government began to retest the incinerator for a planned operation in June 2022.

== See also ==
- Air pollution in Taiwan
- Waste management in Taiwan
