= Gangshan Refuse Incineration Plant =

Incinerator in Gangshan, Kaohsiung, Taiwan

Gangshan Refuse Incineration Plant 岡山垃圾焚化廠
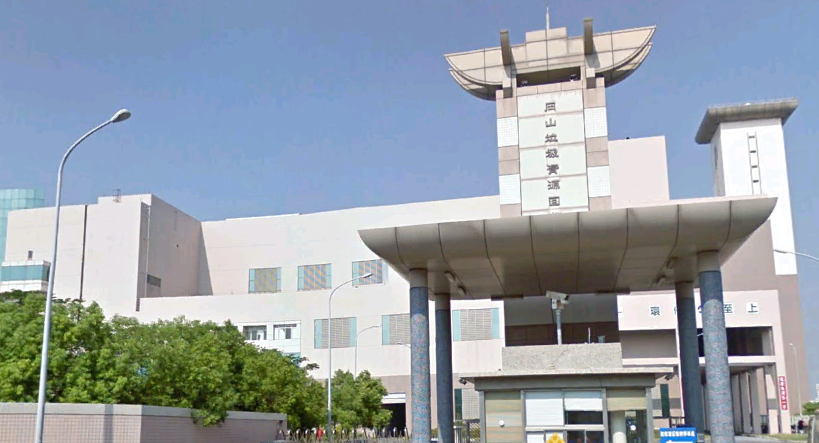
- Built: February 2001
- Location: Gangshan, Kaohsiung, Taiwan
- Coordinates: 22°48′40.8″N 120°16′10.7″E
- Industry: waste management
- Products: processed waste, electricity
- Style: incinerator
- Area: 7.24 ha (17.9 acres)
- Volume: 1,350 tons of garbage per day

The Gangshan Refuse Incineration Plant (traditional Chinese: 岡山垃圾焚化廠; simplified Chinese: 冈山垃圾焚化厂; pinyin: Gāngshān Lèsè Fénhuà Chǎng) is an incinerator in Gangshan District, Kaohsiung, Taiwan.

== History ==
The construction of the plant was completed in February 2001 led by Takuma Co. Ltd. and China Steel. In May 2017, the ECOVE Environment Service Corp. was contracted to do the revamping work of the plant. The first phase of the work was completed in November 2017.

== Architecture ==
The plant building covers an area of 7.24 hectares.

== Technical details ==
The plant can treat 1,350 tons of garbage per day and produce 912 MWh of electricity per day and run by Taiwan Sugar Corporation. As of 2020, it received a total of 31,324 tons of garbage annually and incinerated 33,026 tons of them.

== Transportation ==
The plant is accessible northwest of Gangshan station of Taiwan Railway and Kaohsiung Metro.

== See also ==
- Air pollution in Taiwan
- Waste management in Taiwan
