= Beitou Refuse Incineration Plant =

Incinerator in Beitou, Taipei, Taiwan

Beitou Refuse Incineration Plant 北投垃圾焚化廠
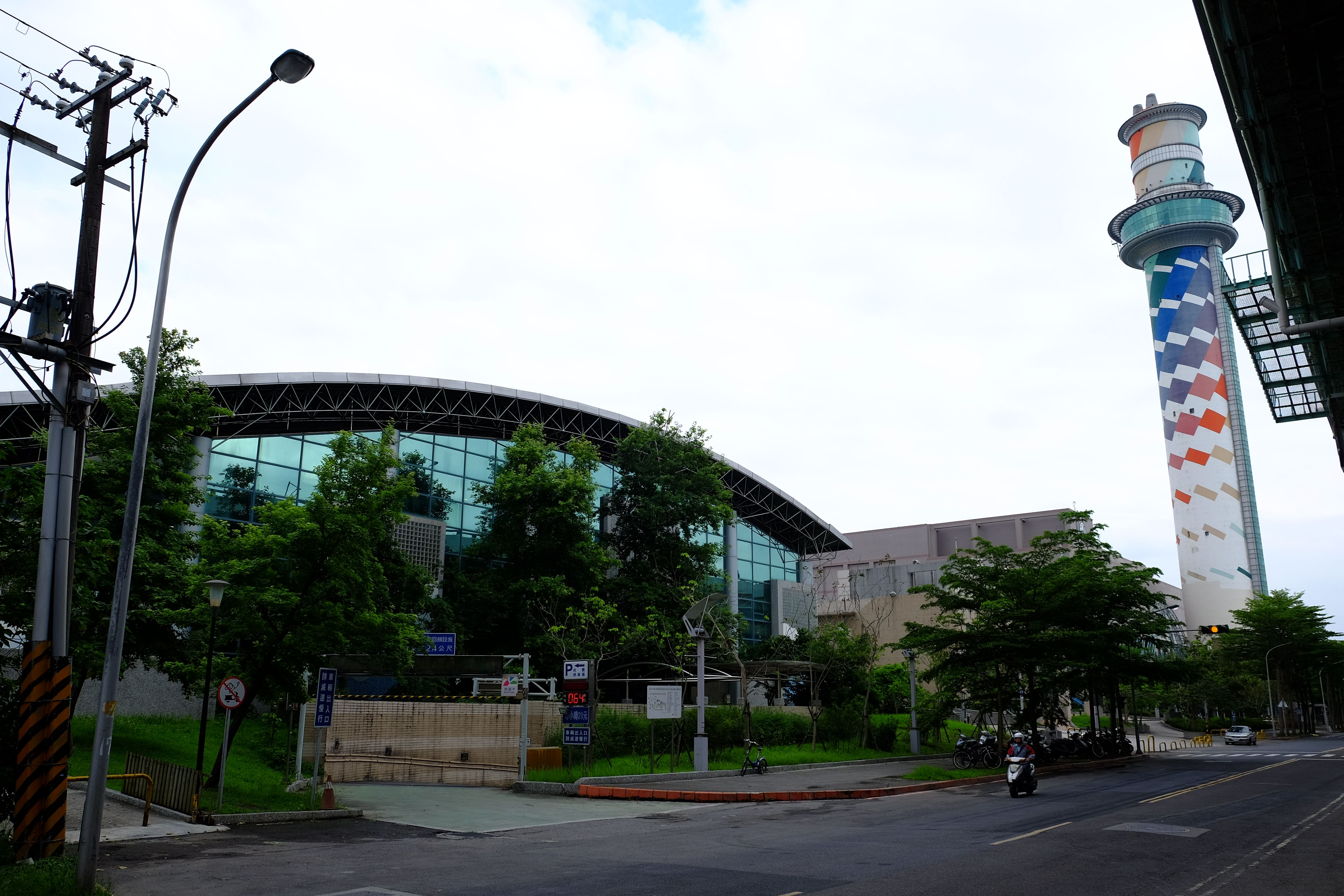
- Operated: 1999
- Location: Beitou, Taipei, Taiwan
- Coordinates: 25°6′28.8″N 121°30′1.1″E
- Industry: waste management
- Style: incinerator
- Area: 10.6 ha (26 acres)
- Owners: Department of Environmental Protection, Taipei City Government

The Beitou Refuse Incineration Plant (traditional Chinese: 北投垃圾焚化廠; simplified Chinese: 北投垃圾焚化厂; pinyin: Běitóu Lèsè Fénhuà Chǎng) is an incinerator in Zhoumei Borough, Beitou District, Taipei, Taiwan.

== History ==
The plant was originally established as the Shilin Refuse Incineration Plant on 1 July 1991. On 1 July 1995, the plant was renamed Beitou Refuse Incineration Plant and it was made a unit of the Department of Environmental Protection of the Taipei City Government.

== Technical details ==
The plant spans an area of 10.6 hectares (26 acres). It can treat 1,800 tonnes (1,800 long tons; 2,000 short tons) of garbage from the Taipei area per day.

== Facilities ==
The plant's smokestack is equipped with an observation deck at an altitude of 116 metres (381 ft). On 1 January 2000, a revolving restaurant opened above it (claimed to be world's first restaurant on a waste incinerator chimney), which seats 120 guests and is powered by energy from the incinerator.

== Transportation ==
The plant is accessible within walking distance southwest of Shipai Station of Taipei Metro.

== See also ==
- Air pollution in Taiwan
- Waste management in Taiwan
- Neihu Refuse Incineration Plant, also located in Taipei
