= Hsinchu City EPB Incinerator Plant =

Incinerator in North, Hsinchu City, Taiwan

Hsinchu City EPB Incinerator Plant 新竹市垃圾焚化廠
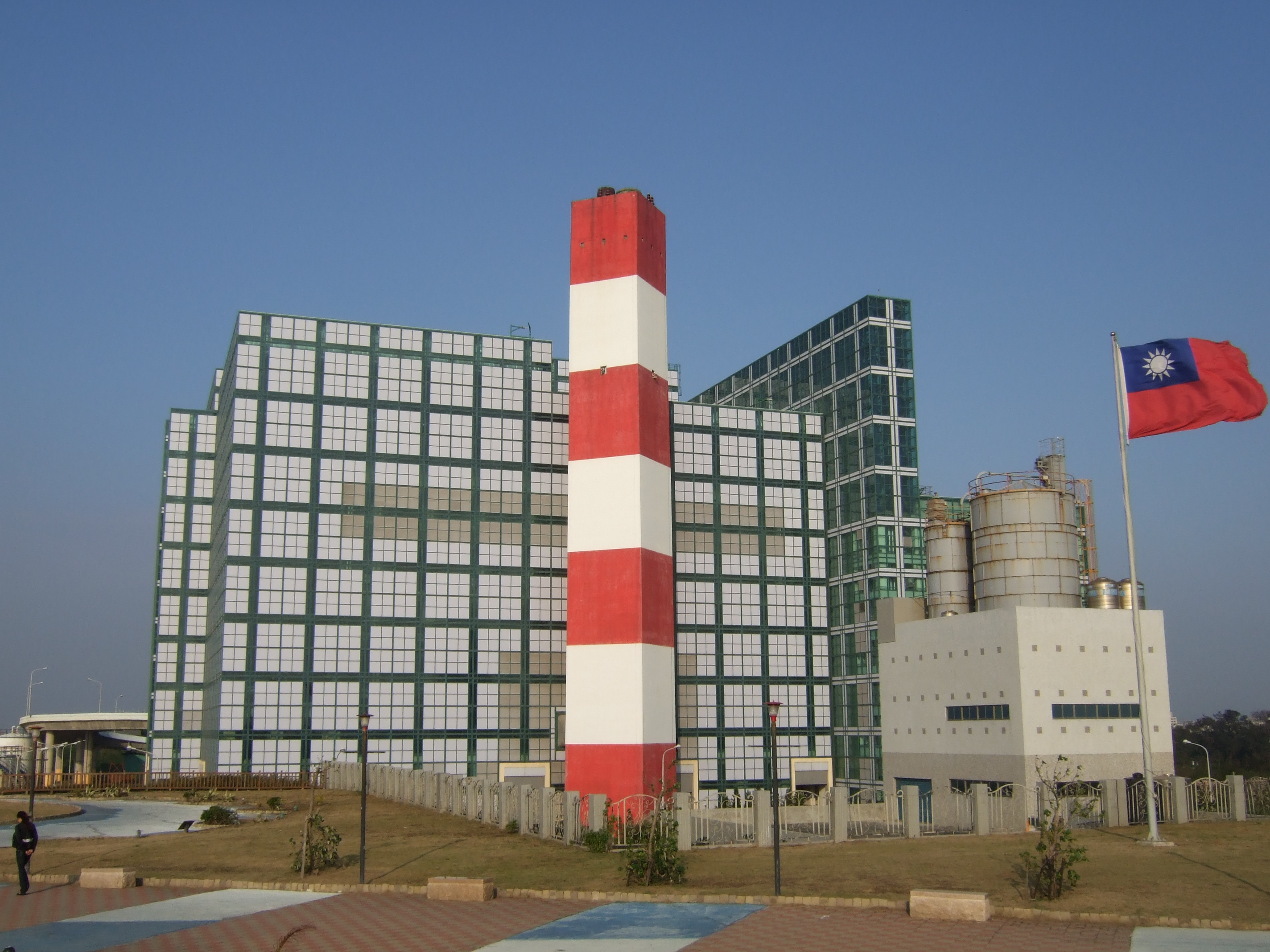
- Built: August 2000
- Operated: 16 February 2001
- Location: North, Hsinchu City, Taiwan
- Coordinates: 24°50′3.3″N 120°55′0.5″E
- Industry: waste management
- Products: processed waste, electricity
- Style: incinerator
- Area: 5.5 ha (14 acres)
- Volume: 900 tons of garbage per day

The Hsinchu City EPB Incinerator Plant (traditional Chinese: 新竹市垃圾焚化廠; simplified Chinese: 新竹市垃圾焚化厂; pinyin: Xīnzhú Shì Lèsè Fénhuà Chǎng) is an incinerator in North District, Hsinchu City, Taiwan.

== History ==
The construction plan of the plant was approved by Environmental Protection Administration on 2 September 1991. The architect of the plant was appointed in 1992 and contract for the construction work was signed in April 1994. On 11 April 1995, the construction work began and finished in August 2000. The plant began its operation on 16 February 2001.

== Geology ==
The site was constructed at the Nanliao landfill area with an area of 30 hectares. The area used to be a beach but was transformed into a landfill in 1973 but was eventually closed in November 1994.

== Architecture ==
The plant was designed by architect Ieoh Ming-pei. It occupies a 5.5 hectares of land.

== Technical details ==
The plant can treat 900 tons of garbage per day from Hsinchu City, Miaoli County and Taoyuan City and produce 24 MWh of electricity per day. As of 2020, it received a total of 22,606 tons of garbage annually and incinerated 21,827 tons of them.

== See also ==
- Air pollution in Taiwan
- Waste management in Taiwan
