= Neihu Refuse Incineration Plant =

Incinerator in Neihu, Taipei, Taiwan

Neihu Refuse Incineration Plant 內湖垃圾焚化廠
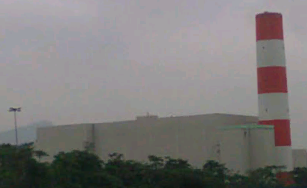
- Built: January 1992
- Location: Neihu, Taipei, Taiwan
- Coordinates: 25°3′43.9″N 121°36′16.2″E
- Industry: waste management
- Style: incinerator
- Owner: Environmental Protection Bureau of Taipei City Government

The Neihu Refuse Incineration Plant (traditional Chinese: 內湖垃圾焚化廠; simplified Chinese: 内湖垃圾焚化厂; pinyin: Nèihú Lèsè Fénhuà Chǎng) is an incinerator in Neihu District, Taipei, Taiwan.

== History ==
The construction of the plant was completed in January 1992, led by Takuma Co. Ltd. as the main contractor.

== Technical details ==
The plant can treat 900 tons of garbage per day and produce 144 MWh of electricity per day. As of 2020, it received a total of 4,855 tons of garbage annually and incinerated 410 tons of them.

== See also ==
- Air pollution in Taiwan
- Waste management in Taiwan
- Beitou Refuse Incineration Plant, also located in Taipei
