= Recycling in Taiwan =

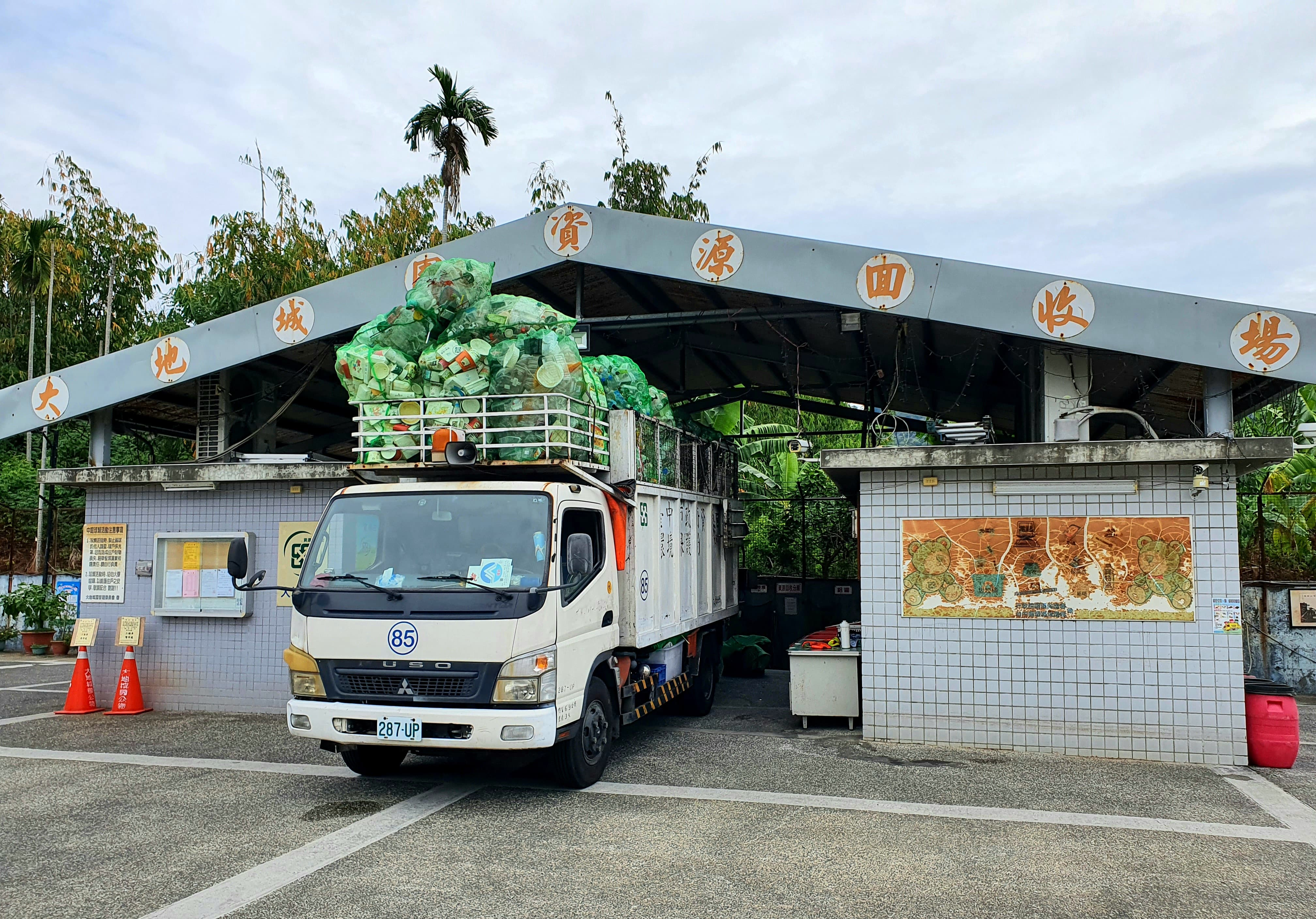
Garbage truck in Taichung, Taiwan

Taiwan has one of the most efficient recycling programs globally, with a 55% collection rate from households and businesses and a 77% collection rate from industrial waste in 2019.

== History ==
The history of recycling in Taiwan can be traced back to the Revisions to Articles 4, 11 and 20 and addition of Articles 10-1 and 23-1 promulgated by presidential order on November 11, 1988. A second effort was made through the Revisions to Articles 10-1, 23-1 and 31 promulgated by presidential order on March 28, 1997 (See Legislative History of Waste Disposal Act), and the 4-in-1 recycling program initiated by the Environmental Protection Administration and implemented in 1997. The 4-in-1 recycling program serves as a recycling and disposal system that collects fees to establish a recycling fund to further promote the waste management system of Taiwan. Prior to the introduction of the recycling program, Taiwan's landfills were filling up due to rapid economic growth during the late 1970s. The economic development of the island led to 8,800 metric tonnes of MSW (municipal solid waste) accumulating a day by 1979, 18,800 by 1990, and around 21,900 tonnes by 1992. By the mid-'90s, the waste management infrastructure included a little more than 400 nearly full landfills, resulting in Taiwan being nicknamed "garbage island".

The 4-in-1 recycling program is part of Taiwan's extended producer responsibility (EPR) scheme. The fees charged by this program are paid by manufacturers and importers to the government, which uses this money to fund recycling programs such as educational campaigns and the development of new recycling programs. In 1997, the recycling rate in Taiwan was 5.87%; however, that has increased to over 60% in some areas as of 2011, with a nationwide average of 55%. At the same time, household daily waste has decreased from 1.14kg to 0.43kg. Furthermore, by 2002, MSW production has dropped by 27% from 1997.

Taiwan has sought to contribute to the global frontier in tackling issues of waste management; however, due to Taiwan not being a member of the United Nations or the World Health Organization, reports stemming from Taiwan have often been disregarded.

== Residential recycling ==
Taiwan's household recycling rate in 2017 was over 50%, making it second in the world to Germany.

The government encourages its residents to recycle by implementing policies where residents have to purchase specific types and colors of trash bags that are based on where one lives. The bags vary in size and price, which assists in supporting the costs of the Taiwanese waste management system. Residents place the items in the appropriate bags and then they are normally picked up by two different trucks. Some trucks collect regular waste, while others collect recyclable waste and a variety of food waste.

In Taiwan's neighborhoods, garbage trucks signal their arrival by playing Ludwig van Beethoven's Fur Elise or "Maiden's Prayer" by Tekla Bądarzewska-Baranowska. People then know that it is time to bring out their trash, and some residents use this opportunity to socialize with neighbors; some have noted that this nightly ritual not only helps to keep the nation clean but also helps to build a sense of civic responsibility among citizens.

== Recycling categories ==
According to Article 5 of Taiwan's Waste Disposal Act, which is defined by Recycling Regulations in Taiwan and the 4-in-1 Recycling Program, regulated recyclable waste, otherwise known as RRW, includes 13 categories and 33 different items. The categories include metal containers, aluminum containers, Tetra Pak brand containers, paper tableware, plastic containers, containers of pesticides, batteries, automobiles/motorcycles, tires, lead-acid batteries, computer appliances, electrical appliances, and lightbulbs/tubes. Of these regulated recyclable wastes, depending on whether it falls under general or industrial waste, according to Article 15 of Taiwan's Waste Disposal Act, it is the responsibility of manufacturers, importers, and retailers to accept these wastes from customers for recycling purposes. Depending on the locality, recycling categories can exceed 15 or more. For example, Taoyuan City's multilingual flyer shows 18 recycling categories.

=== Lightbulbs and tube lights ===
The recycling rates of fluorescent lamps in Taiwan are 88% as of 2019. The most common method used involves thermal desorption.

=== General batteries ===
The recycling rates for dry batteries in Taiwan are 45% as of 2019. The most common method used involves batch process distillation.

== Recycling of hazardous materials ==
According to Article 15 of Taiwan's Waste Disposal Act, manufacturers, importers and retailers are responsible for recycling and treating hazardous substances that have been disposed because they may have serious polluting effects on the environment.

== iTrash stations ==
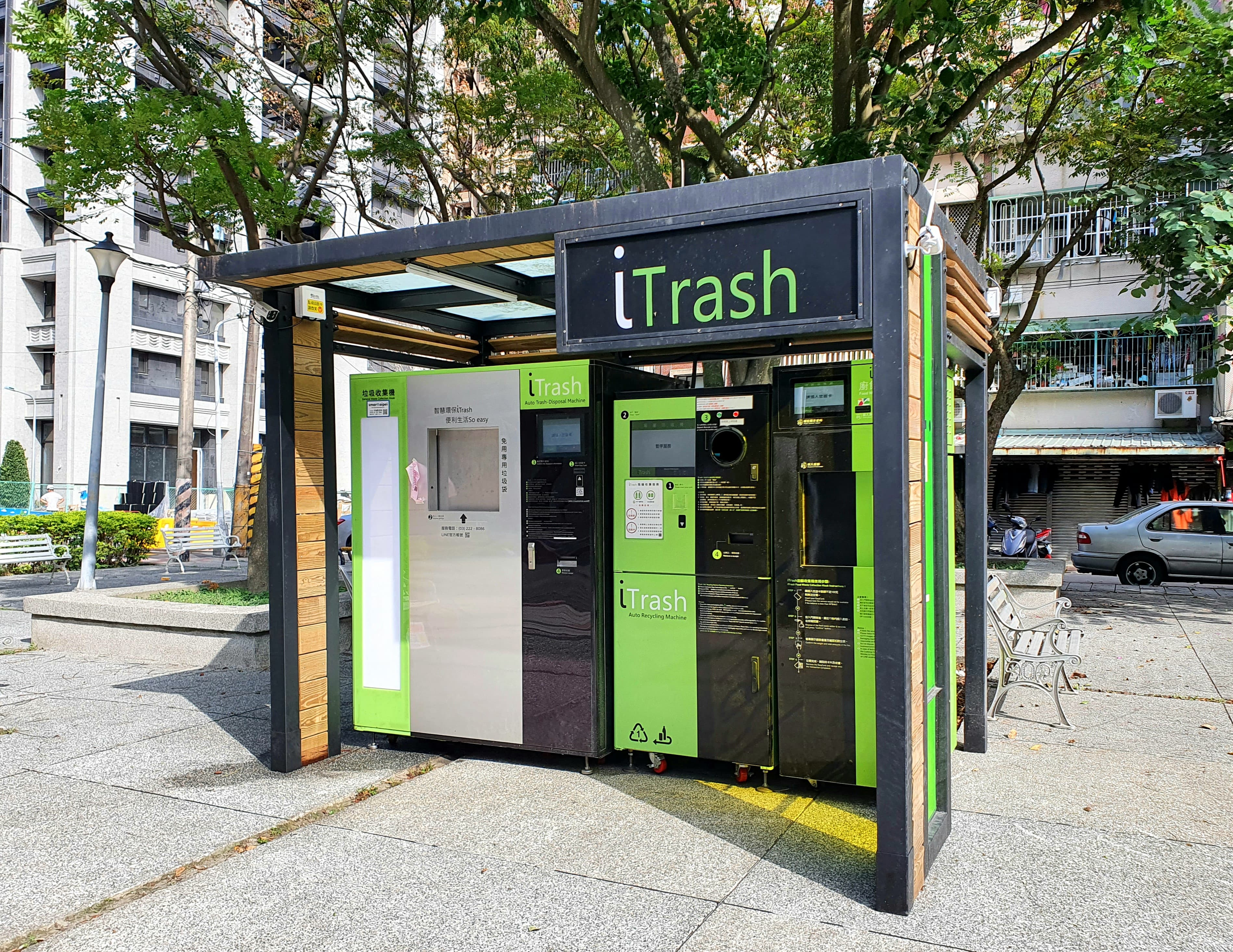
3iTrash Station located in Taipei, Taiwan

Taiwan has implemented iTrash stations, designed by Hao-Yang Environment Technology Ltd., which is essentially a reverse vending machine that charges for household garbage and pays for recycling. The iTrash stations offer credit on users' EasyCard, which serves as a smartcard that can be used for payments for Taipei Metro, public transportation and can even be used in businesses in Taipei. Initially, the iTrash station project started as a four month long trial in Taipei and in response to the trial, Liou Ming-lone, the commissioner of Technology Conservation Group's Department of Environmental Protection, stated that more iTrash stations will be implemented around the city of Taipei in 2019.

== See also ==
- Waste management in Taiwan
- Waste minimisation
