= Miaoli County Refuse Incineration Plant =

Incinerator in Zhunan, Miaoli County, Taiwan

Miaoli County Refuse Incineration Plant 苗栗縣垃圾焚化廠
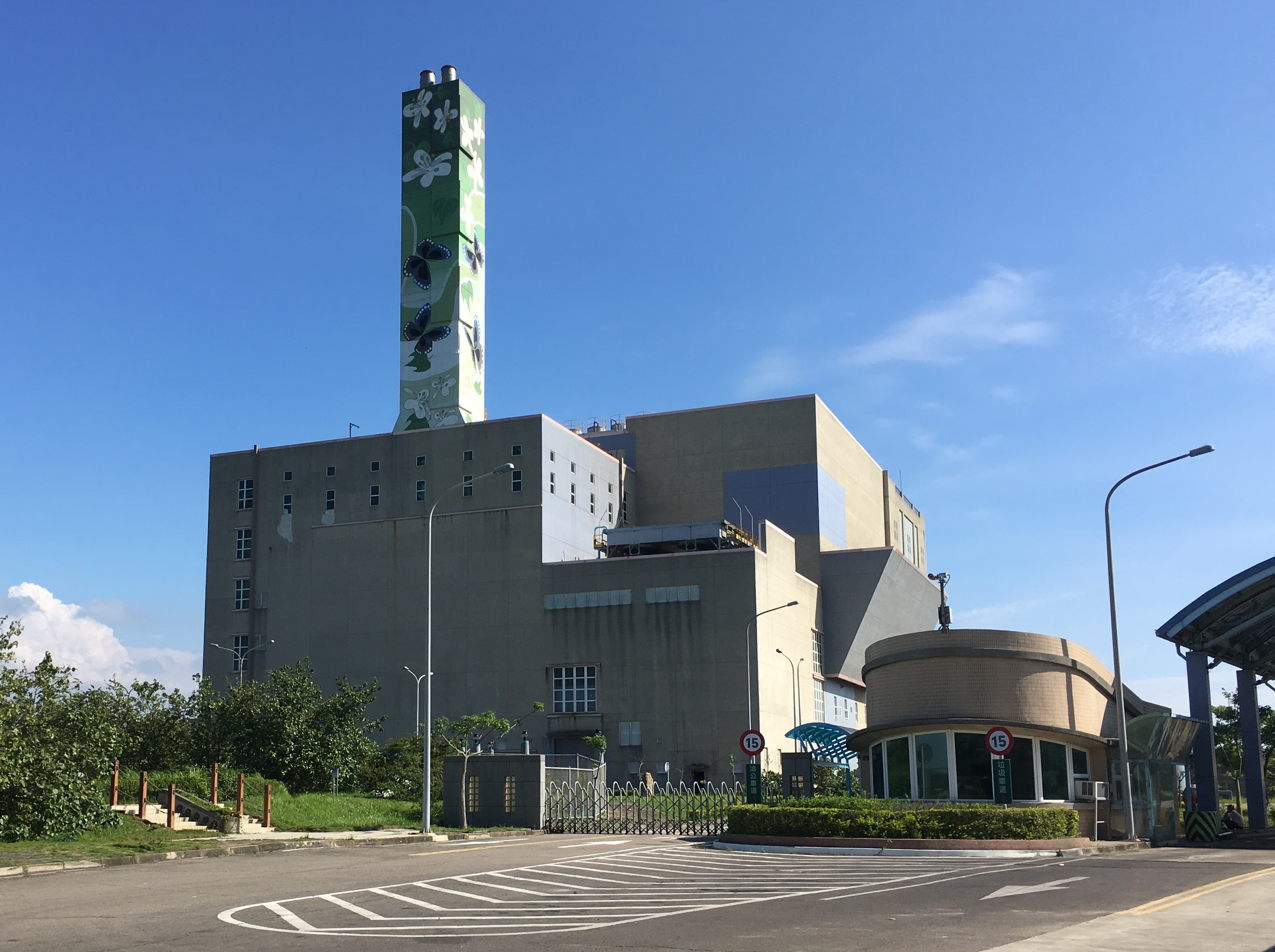
- Built: 13 September 2002
- Operated: 29 February 2008
- Location: Zhunan, Miaoli County, Taiwan
- Coordinates: 24°40′23.7″N 120°50′08.6″E
- Industry: waste management
- Style: incinerator
- Owner: Miaoli County Government

The Miaoli County Refuse Incineration Plant (traditional Chinese: 苗栗縣垃圾焚化廠; simplified Chinese: 苗栗县垃圾焚化厂; pinyin: Miáolì Xiàn Lèsè Fénhuà chǎng) is an incinerator in Zhunan Township, Miaoli County, Taiwan. As of December 2019, monthly the incinerator received about 14,260 tons of waste and 14,316 tons of them was incinerated. The plant produced 8.193 GWh of electricity and 83.79% of it was sold to Taipower. It produced 2,454 tones of ashes.

== History ==
The Miaoli County Refuse Incineration Plant is owned by Miaoli County Government. The construction of the incinerator began on 13 September 2002 and completed on 28 February 2008. It began its commercial operation on 29 February 2008. In 2017, the incinerator began to promote waste sorting before it reaches the plant. On 3 July 2018, the incinerator was awarded the Distinguished Honor Award in a ceremony held at Dragon Valley Hotel in Heping District, Taichung.

== Technical specifications ==
The incinerator has a daily capacity of 500 tones. It currently operates at 93.74% operation rate. The waste it receives can generate an annual power production of 95 GWh. As of 2020, it received a total of 15,564 tons of garbage annually and incinerated 14,740 tons of them.

== See also ==
- Air pollution in Taiwan
