= Renwu District =

District in Kaohsiung, Taiwan

Coordinates: 22.697021°N 120.357773°E

Renwu 仁武區
- District
- Renwu District
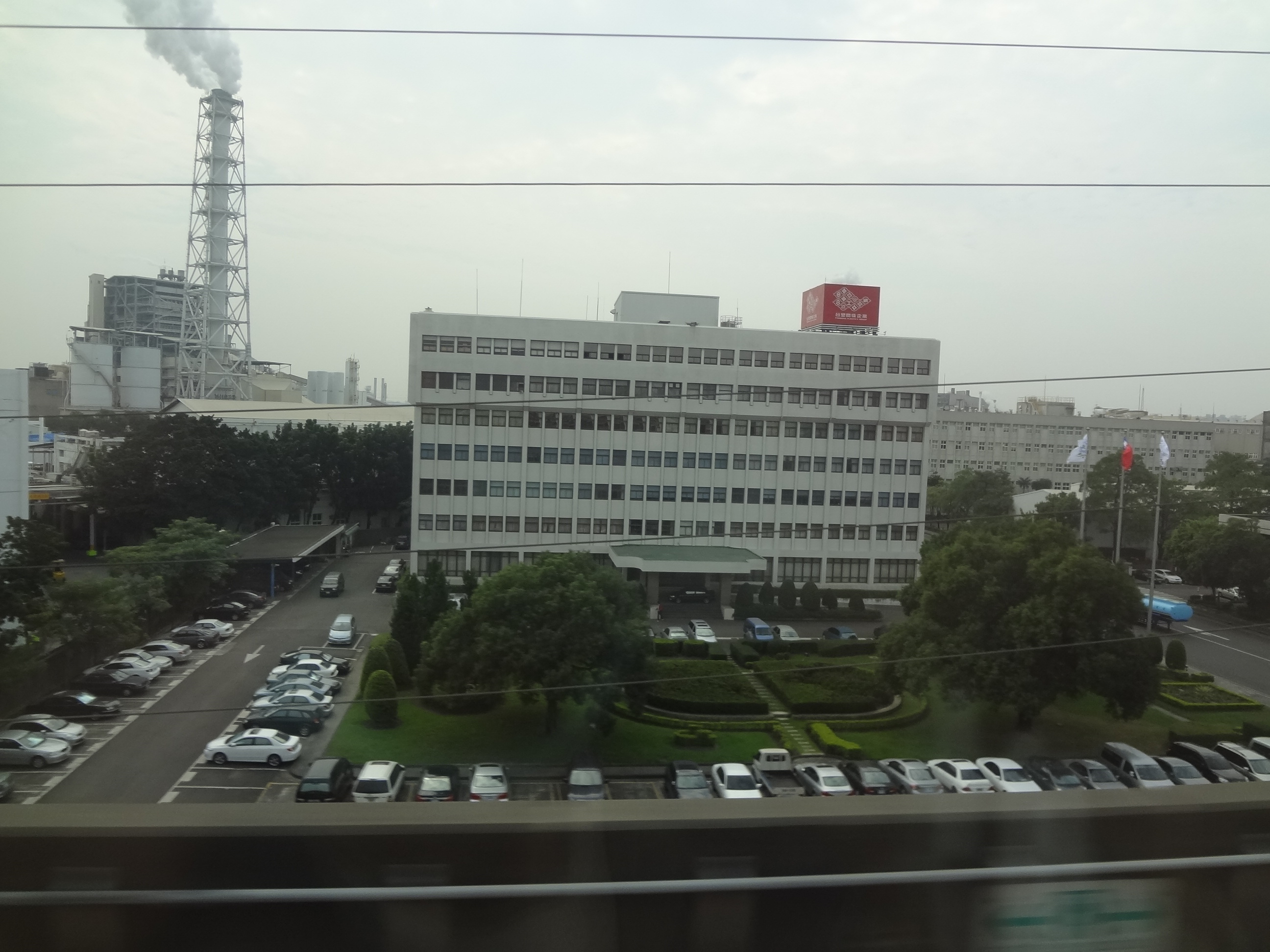

- Renwu District in Kaohsiung City
- Country: Taiwan
- Region: Southern Taiwan

Area
  - Total: 36.08 km^{2} (13.93 sq mi)

Population (October 2023)
  - Total: 97,155
  - Density: 2,693/km^{2} (6,974/sq mi)
- Website: rwdo.kcg.gov.tw/en/

Renwu District or Jenwu District (Chinese: 仁武區; pinyin: Rénwǔ Qū; Wade–Giles: Jen^{2}-wu^{3} Ch'ü^{1}) is a district of Kaohsiung City in southern Taiwan.

== History ==
After the handover of Taiwan from Japan to the Republic of China in 1945, Renwu was organized as a rural township of Kaohsiung County. On 25 December 2010, Kaohsiung County was merged with Kaohsiung City and Renwu was upgraded to a district of the city.

== Geography ==
It has 97,155 inhabitants as of October 2023 and an area of 36.0808 km^{2}.

== Administrative divisions ==
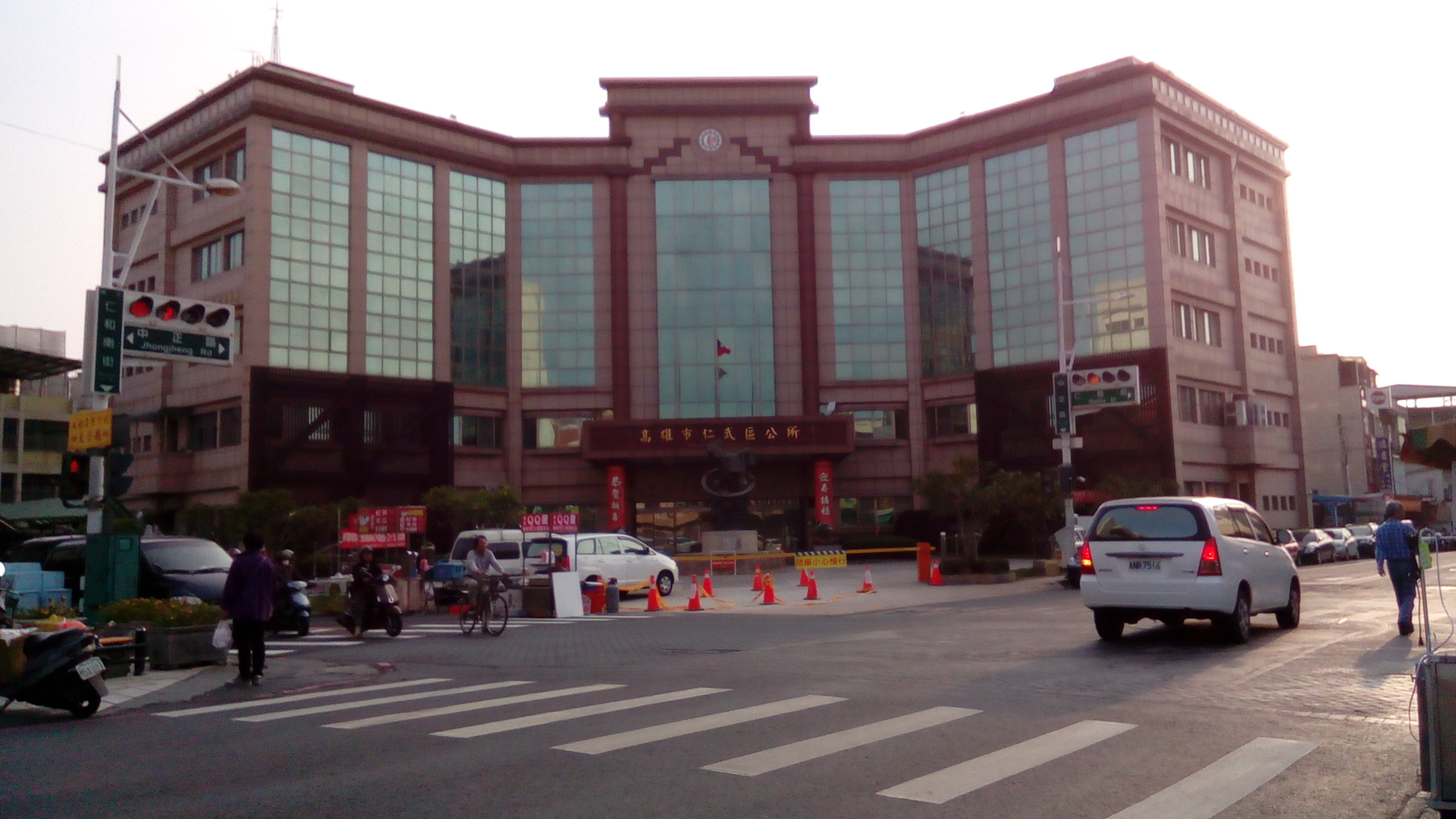
Renwu District Office

The district consists of Dawan, Wannei, Kaotan, Wulin, Renfu, Renwu, Wenwu, Zhuhou, Bagua, Gaonan, Houan, Zhonghua, Wuhe, Renhe, Chishan and Renci Village.

== Infrastructures ==
- Renwu Refuse Incineration Plant

== Transportation ==
Renwu is served by National Freeway 1 and National Freeway 10, as well as Provincial Highway 1. Taiwan Railway's Western Trunk line and Taiwan High Speed Rail both pass through Renwu, but no station is currently planned.

== See also ==
- Kaohsiung
