= Bali Refuse Incineration Plant =

Incinerator in Bali, New Taipei, Taiwan

Bali Refuse Incineration Plant 八里垃圾焚化廠
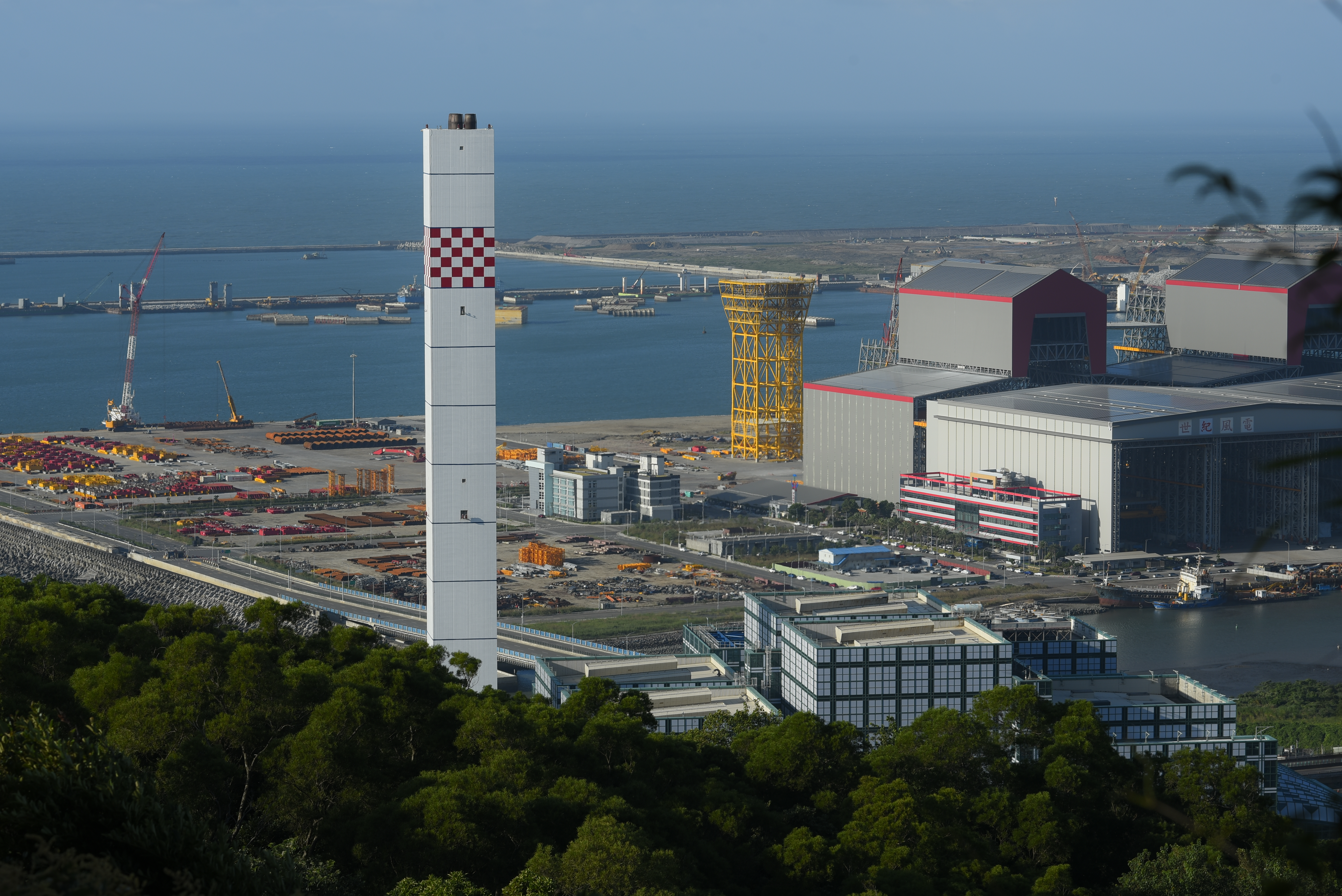
- Built: 1997
- Operated: 2001
- Location: Bali District, New Taipei, Taiwan
- Coordinates: 25°08′04″N 121°22′04″E
- Industry: waste management
- Architect: I. M. Pei
- Style: incinerator
- Area: 3.5 ha (8.6 acres)
- Owner: New Taipei City Government

The Bali Refuse Incineration Plant (traditional Chinese: 八里垃圾焚化廠; simplified Chinese: 八里垃圾焚化厂; pinyin: Bālǐ Lèsè Fénhuà Chǎng) is an incinerator in Bali District, New Taipei, Taiwan. The chimney of the incineration plant is 150 m (490 ft) tall.

== History ==
The construction of the plant started in 1997 and completed in 2001. With a total area of 3.5 hectares, the plant began its commercial operation the same year.

== Technical details ==
The plant has a capacity of treating 1,350 tons of garbage per day. To prevent the dissolved dioxin components from recomposing back to life due to temperature drop, an activated carbon injection unit is installed to adsorb heavy metals and dioxins by its porous nature, resulting in a clean air treatment.

== See also ==
- Air pollution in Taiwan
