= Muzha Refuse Incineration Plant =

Incinerator in Wenshan, Taipei, Taiwan

Muzha Refuse Incineration Plant 木柵垃圾焚化廠
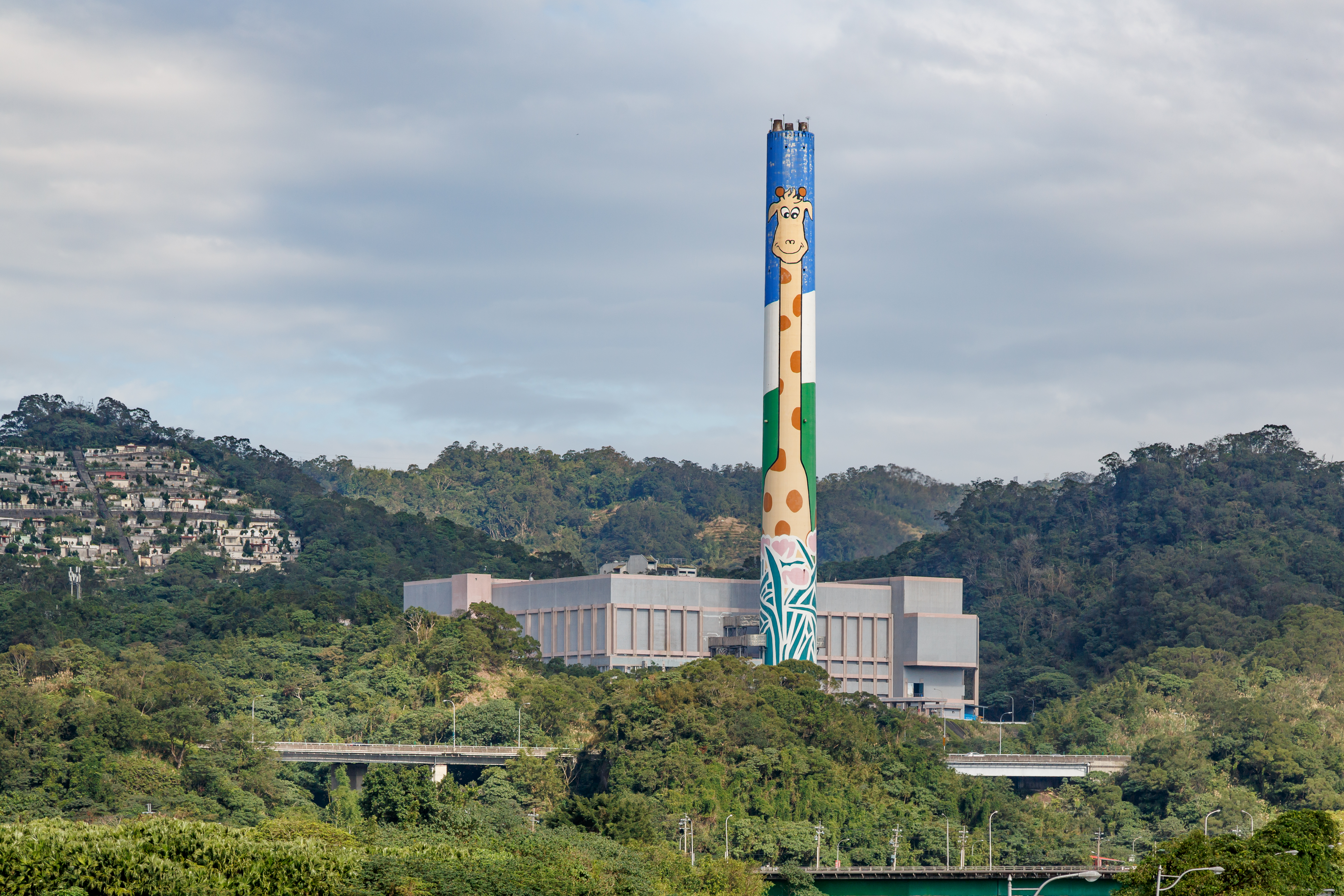
- Built: January 1994
- Operated: 28 March 1995
- Location: Wenshan, Taipei, Taiwan
- Coordinates: 25°00′20.7″N 121°35′16.4″E
- Industry: waste management
- Style: incinerator
- Area: 3.9 ha (9.6 acres)

The Muzha Refuse Incineration Plant (traditional Chinese: 木柵垃圾焚化廠; simplified Chinese: 木栅垃圾焚化厂; pinyin: Mùshān Lèsè Fénhuà Chǎng) is an incinerator in Muzha, Wenshan District, Taipei, Taiwan.

== History ==
The construction of the plant started on 1 July 1989 and completed in January 1994. It began its commercial operation on 28 March 1995. On 13 June 2018, Taipei Mayor Ko Wen-je announced that the plant will undergo refurbishment works, such as the upgrading of its gas treatment and electrical system, repainting of the stack with images of blue magpies, rhododendrons and banyan trees.

== Architecture ==
The plant consists of one stack with a height of 150 meters. It is decorated with images of giraffes.

== Technical details ==
The plant has a capacity of treating 1,200 tons of garbage per day from its four boilers. As of 2020, it received a total of 26,073 tons of garbage annually and incinerated 25,682 tons of them.

== Transportation ==
The plant is within walking distance of Taipei Zoo Station.

== See also ==
- Air pollution in Taiwan
