= Rose China Town light rail station =

Light rail station in New Taipei, Taiwan

Rose China Town K02 玫瑰中國城站
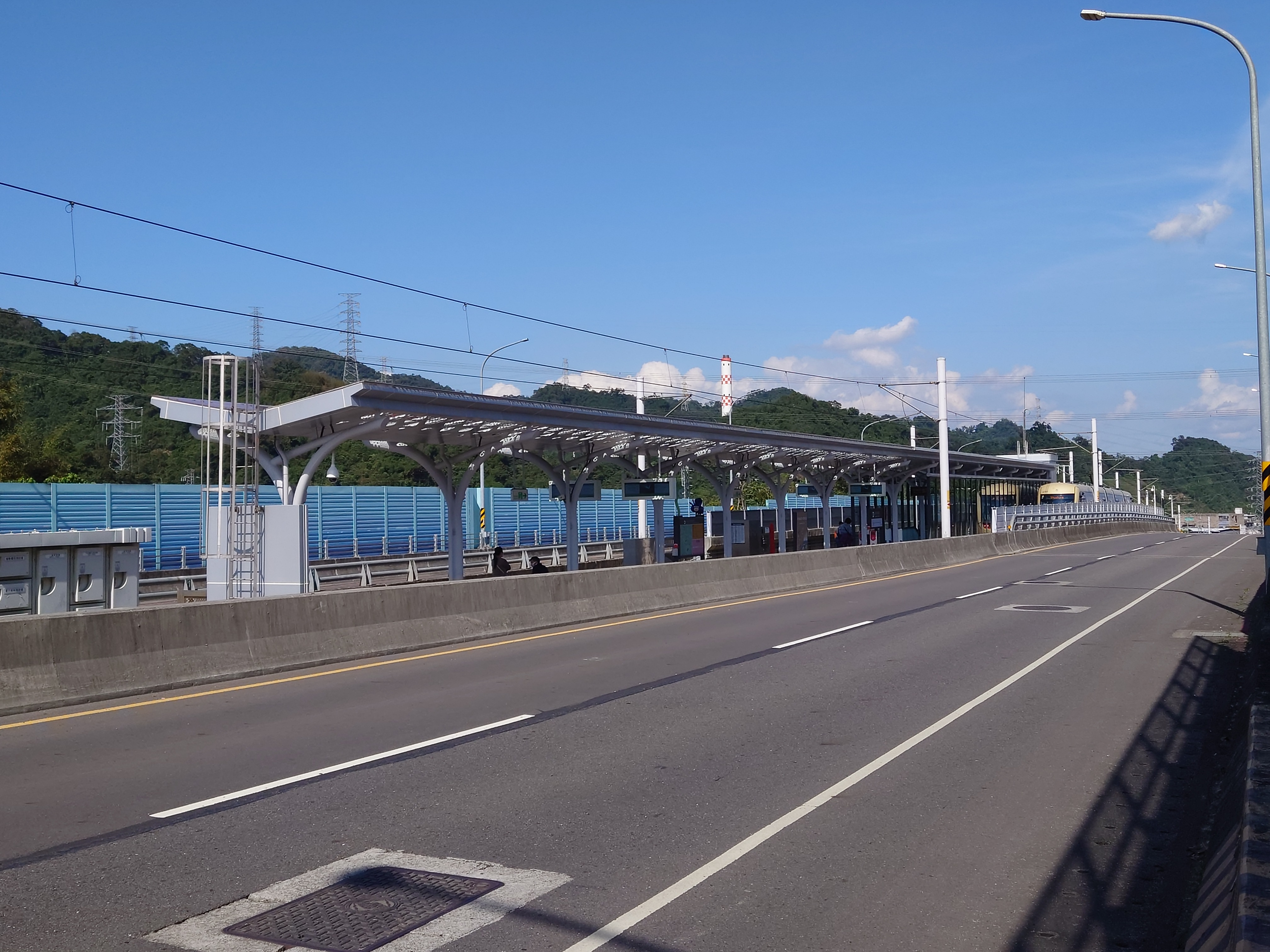
- Station exterior

General information
- Location: Xindian, New Taipei; Taiwan
- Coordinates: 24.9509°N 121.4940°E
- Operated by: New Taipei Metro
- Platforms: Island platform
- Connections: Bus stop

Construction
- Structure type: Elevated
- Accessible: Yes

Other information
- Station code: K02

History
- Opened: February 10, 2023

Services
Preceding station	New Taipei Metro	Following station
Shuangcheng Terminus	Ankeng LRT	Taipei Xiaocheng towards Shisizhang
Location

Rose China Town (Chinese: 玫瑰中國城站; pinyin: Méiguī zhōngguó chéng zhàn) is a light rail station of the Ankeng light rail, operated by the New Taipei Metro, in Xindian, New Taipei, Taiwan.

== Station overview ==
This is an elevated station with an island platform. It is located on Section 3, Anyi Road, near its intersection with Meigui Road.

== Station layout ==
Second floor	← Ankeng light rail to Shuangcheng (K01 terminus)
Second floor	Island platform, doors open on the left
Second floor	→ Ankeng light rail to Shisizhang (K03 Taipei Xiaocheng) →
Second floor	Entrance/exit
Street level	Entrance/exit

== Around the station ==
- Zhongyang Park
- Rose China Town

== Bus connections ==
Buses 648 and 909 stop at this station.

== History ==
Construction of the station started in 2014 and finished in 2022. The station opened on February 10, 2023.

== See also ==
- Ankeng light rail
- New Taipei Metro
- Rail transport in Taiwan
