= Sports Park station =

Sports Park station may refer to

- Sports Park station (Busan Metro), a metro station in Busan, South Korea
- Sports Park station (Chongqing Rail Transit), a metro station in Chongqing, China, on the Loop line of Chongqing Rail Transit
- Sports Park station (Harbin Metro), a metro station in Harbin, China, on Line 3 of Harbin Metro
- Sports Park station (Nantong Metro), a metro station under construction in Nantong, China, on Line 2 of Nantong Metro

== See also ==
- Sports Kōen Station (literally Sports Park Station), a railway station in Echizen, Fukui Prefecture, Japan
- Lugu Sports Park station, on Line 6 of Changsha Metro, in Changsha, Hunan Province, China
- Sunshine Sports Park station, a station on Ankeng light rail in Xindian District, New Taipei City, Taiwan
- Taoyuan Sports Park metro station, a metro station in Zhongli, Taoyuan City, Taiwan
