= Xinhe Elementary School light rail station =

Light rail station in New Taipei, Taiwan

Xinhe Elementary School K08 新和國小站
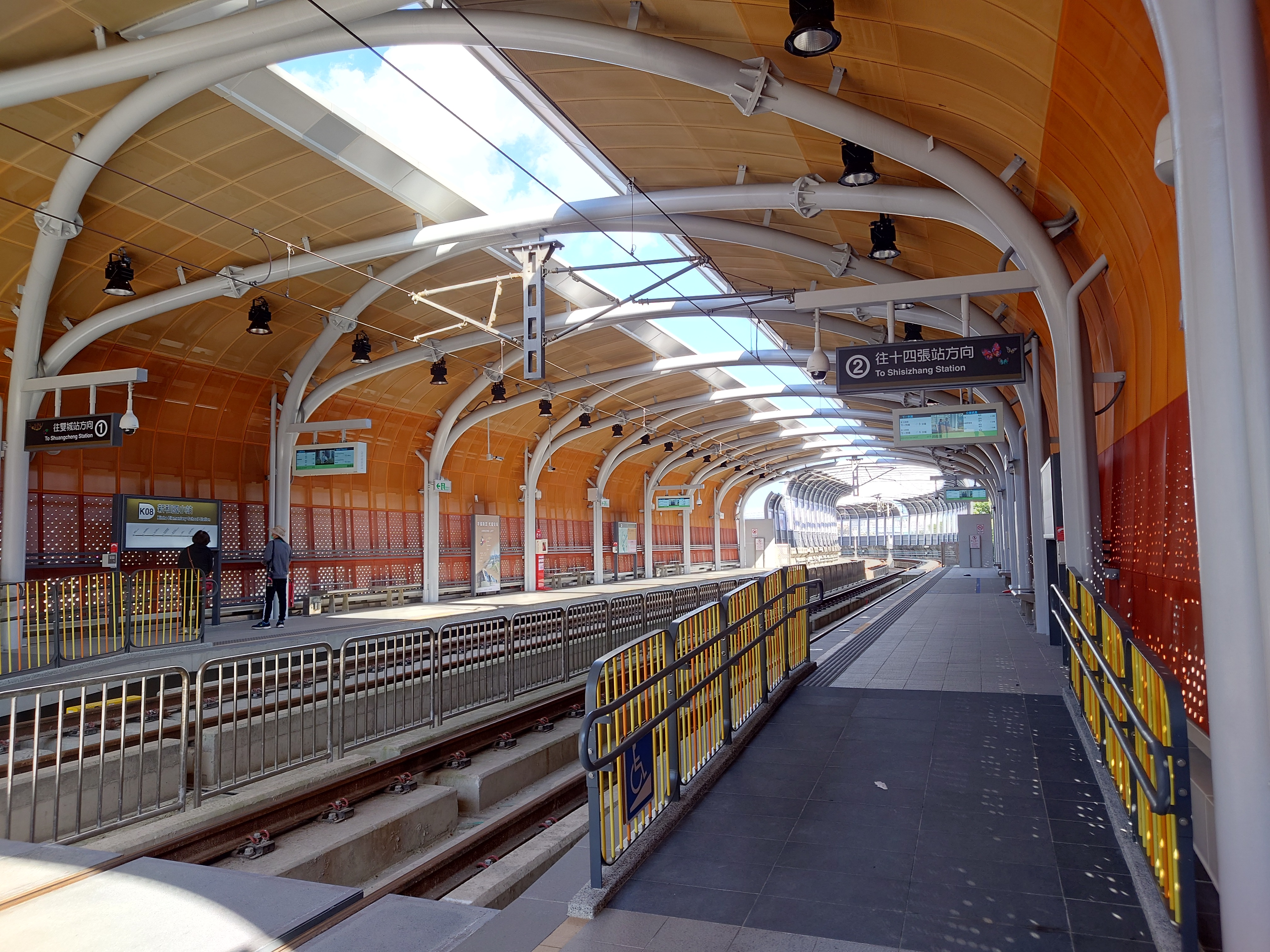
- Station exterior

General information
- Location: Xindian, New Taipei; Taiwan
- Coordinates: 24.9835°N 121.5186°E
- Operated by: New Taipei Metro
- Platforms: 2 side platforms
- Connections: Bus stop

Construction
- Structure type: Elevated
- Accessible: Yes

Other information
- Station code: K08

History
- Opened: February 10, 2023

Services
Preceding station	New Taipei Metro	Following station
Sunshine Sports Park towards Shuangcheng	Ankeng light rail	Shisizhang Terminus
Location

Xinhe Elementary School (Chinese: 新和國小站; Pinyin: Xīnhé guóxiǎo zhàn) is a light rail station of the Ankeng light rail, operated by the New Taipei Metro, in Xindian, New Taipei, Taiwan.

== Station overview ==
The station is an elevated station with 2 side platforms. It is located on Section 3, Anhe Road, near the Xindian office of the Water Resources Agency.

== Station layout ==
Second floor	Side platform, doors open on the right
Second floor	Platform 1	← Ankeng light rail to Shuangcheng (K07 Sunshine Sports Park)
Second floor	Platform 2	→ Ankeng light rail to Shisizhang (K09 Terminus) →
Second floor	Side platform, doors open on the right
Ground level	Entrance	Elevator, escalator, stairs

== Around the station ==
- Water Resources Bureau Research Institute
- Xinhe Elementary School
- Xindian Yong-an Post Office Banqiao Branch 56

== Bus connections ==
Buses 8, 202, 208, 576, 624, 897, O1, and O9 stop at this station.

== History ==
Construction of the station started on November 7, 2014 and finished in 2022. The station opened on February 10, 2023.

== See also ==
- Ankeng light rail
- New Taipei Metro
- Rail transport in Taiwan
