= Sunshine Sports Park light rail station =

Light rail station in New Taipei, Taiwan

Sunshine Sports Park K07 陽光運動公園站
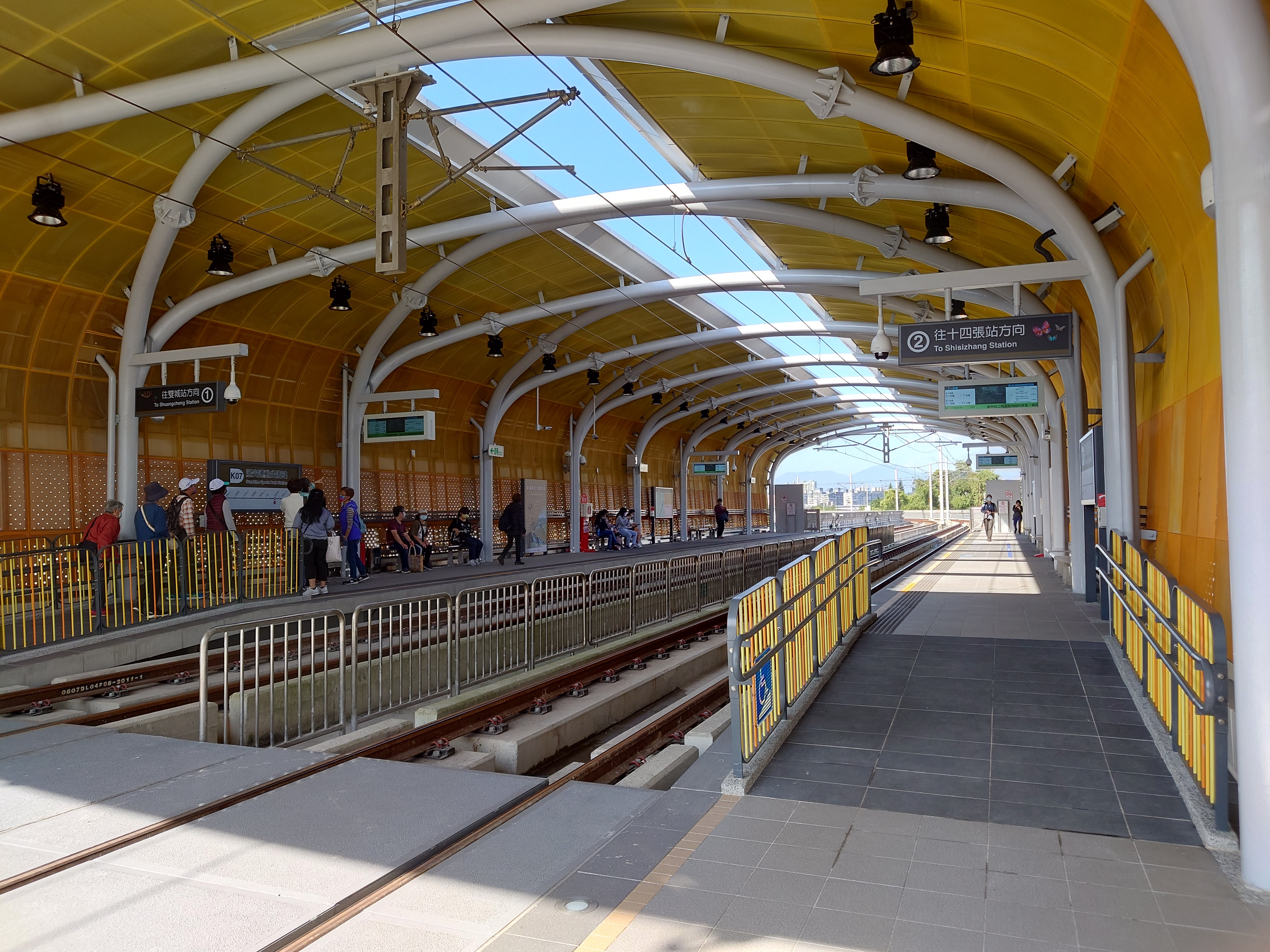
- Station exterior

General information
- Location: Xindian, New Taipei; Taiwan
- Coordinates: 24.9724°N 121.5196°E
- Operated by: New Taipei Metro
- Platforms: 2 side platforms
- Connections: Bus stop

Construction
- Structure type: Elevated
- Accessible: Yes

Other information
- Station code: K07

History
- Opened: February 10, 2023

Services
Preceding station	New Taipei Metro	Following station
Ankang towards Shuangcheng	Ankeng LRT	Xinhe Elementary School towards Shisizhang
Location

Sunshine Sports Park (Chinese: 陽光運動公園站; Pinyin: Yángguāng yùndòng gōngyuán zhàn) is a light rail station of the Ankeng light rail, operated by the New Taipei Metro, in Xindian, New Taipei, Taiwan.

== Station overview ==
The station is an elevated station with two side platforms. It is located on Section 2, Anhe Road, near the intersection of Anli Street.

== Station layout ==
Second floor	Side platform, doors open on the right
Second floor	Platform 1	← Ankeng light rail to Shuangcheng (K06 Ankang)
Second floor	Platform 2	→ Ankeng light rail to Shisizhang (K08 Xinhe Elementary School) →
Second floor	Side platform, doors open on the right
Ground level	Entrance	Elevator, escalator, stairs

== Around the station ==
- Sunshine Sports Park

== Bus connections ==
Buses 8, 202, 208, 248, 576, 624, 897, 913, 935, O1, and O9 stop at this station.

== History ==
Construction of the station started on November 7, 2014, and was completed in 2022. The station opened on February 10, 2023.

== See also ==
- Ankeng light rail
- New Taipei Metro
- Rail transport in Taiwan
