= Ankang light rail station =

Light rail station in New Taipei, Taiwan

Ankang K06 安康站
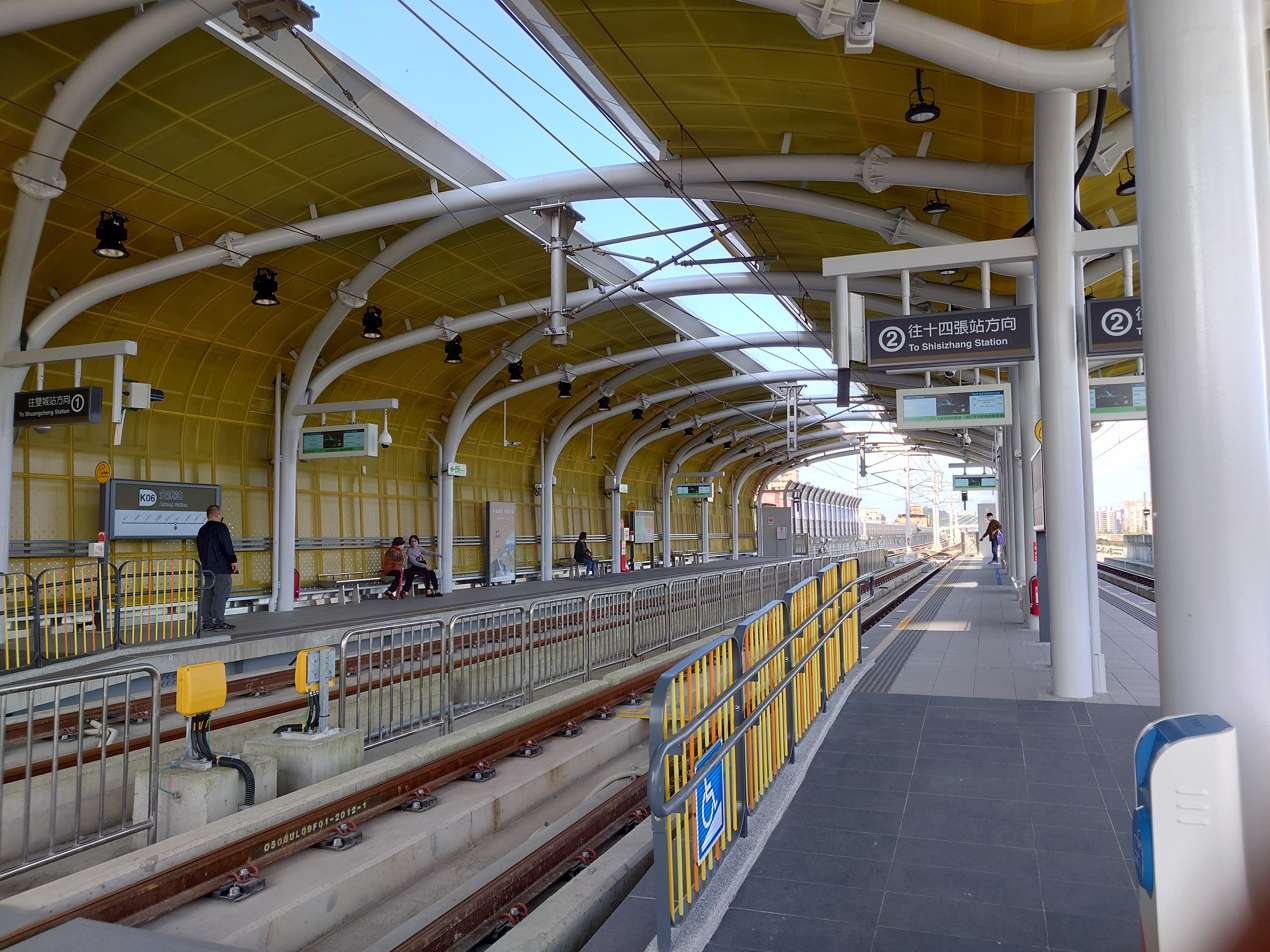
- Station exterior

General information
- Location: Xindian, New Taipei; Taiwan
- Coordinates: 24.9652°N 121.5173°E
- Operated by: New Taipei Metro
- Platforms: 1 side platform, 1 island platform
- Connections: Bus stop

Construction
- Structure type: Elevated
- Accessible: Yes

Other information
- Station code: K06

History
- Opened: February 10, 2023

Services
Preceding station	New Taipei Metro	Following station
Jinwen University of Science and Technology towards Shuangcheng	Ankeng light rail	Sunshine Sports Park towards Shisizhang
Location

Ankang (Chinese: 安康站; Pinyin: Ānkāng zhàn) is a light rail station of the Ankeng light rail, operated by the New Taipei Metro, in Xindian, New Taipei, Taiwan.

== Station overview ==
The station has an elevated station with 1 side platform and 1 island platform. It is located on the intersection of Section 1, Anhe Road, and Section 1, Ankang Road.

== Station layout ==
Second floor	Side platform, doors open on the right
Second floor	← Ankeng light rail to Shuangcheng (K05 Jinwen University of Science and Technology )
Second floor	Ankeng light rail to Shisizhang (K07 Sunshine Sports Park) →
Second floor	Island platform, doors open on the left, right
Second floor	Ankeng light rail to Shisizhang (K07 Sunshine Sports Park) →
Ground level	Entrance	Elevator, escalator, stairs

== Around the station ==
- Ankang Flower Market

== Bus connections ==
Buses 8, 202, 576, 624, 897, 913, 935, 951, O1, and O9 stop at this station.

== History ==
Construction of the station started on November 7, 2013, and finished in 2022. The station opened on February 10, 2023.

== See also ==
- Ankeng light rail
- New Taipei Metro
- Rail transport in Taiwan
