= Dapinglin =

Dapinglin may refer to:

- Dapinglin (大坪林), a place name in Xindian District, New Taipei City, Taiwan.
- Dapinglin metro station, a metro station of the Taipei Metro.
