= Shuangcheng =

Shuangcheng may refer to:

- Shuangcheng, Harbin, Heilongjiang, China
- Shuangcheng, Liangzhou, Wuwei, Gansu, China
- Shuangcheng light rail station, a light rail station of the Ankeng light rail
- Shuangcheng Subdistrict, Cuiping, Yibin, Sichuan, China
