= NCDR =

NCDR may refer to:

- Kool Smiles in Georgia, United States
- National Science and Technology Center for Disaster Reduction in New Taipei, Taiwan
