= 安康 (disambiguation) =

安康 is Chinese for Ankang, a city in Shaanxi Province, China.

安康 may also refer to:

- Angang-eup, a town of Gyeongju City, South Korea
- Emperor Ankō (401–456), 20th Emperor of Japan

== See also ==
- Ankang station (disambiguation)
