= New Taipei Municipal An Kang High School =

An Kang Senior High School, founded in 1980, is located in Xindian District, the southern part of New Taipei City, Taiwan. Covering a campus of about 2.795 hectares, this school is a general senior high school with both junior high and preschool departments.

Originally, the school only established the junior high department. Due to the declining fertility rate, the scale of the junior high department decreased gradually. Recently, the junior high department consists around 20 classes. High school enrollment began in 1998 and had 4 regular classes at the earliest stage. Then, specialized athletics and special education classes were steadily added to the high school department. Beginning from 2014, each grade will recruit 11 classes. In three years, the school will develop into a medium-sized senior high school of 33 classes in total. The pre-school department was founded in 1999 and recruits 1 class.

== Timeline ==
- 1976 January: founding and incorporation of Wenshan Junior High School of Guan Hua Division.
- 1980 July: approval of independence, known as An Kang Junior High School of Taipei County.
- 1996 August: establishment of continuation school of junior high education.
- 1998 August: reformation as a six-year high school, Senior High Department founded.
- 1999 August: establishment of kindergarten, then reformation as a subsidiary kindergarten of An Kang Senior High School in August 2011.
- 2000 October: renamed as An Kang Senior High School of Taipei County.
- 2001 August: establishment of athletic specialized class in Senior High Department.
- 2003 August: establishment of continuation school of senior high education.
- 2010 December 25: Second renamed as New Taipei Municipal An Kang Senior High School.
