= New Taipei Municipal Hsin Tien Senior High School =

Coordinates: 24°58′31.9″N 121°31′54.0″E

New Taipei Municipal Hsin Tien High School

Location
- No.93, Zhongyang Rd., Xindian Dist., New Taipei City 231, Taiwan

Information
- Other name: 新北市立新店高級中學
- Type: Combined junior and senior high school
- Motto: Love and Ideal
- Established: 1992
- School district: New Taipei City, Xindian District, Taiwan
- Principal: Qing-Rong Guo (郭清榮)
- Website: www.htsh.ntpc.edu.tw

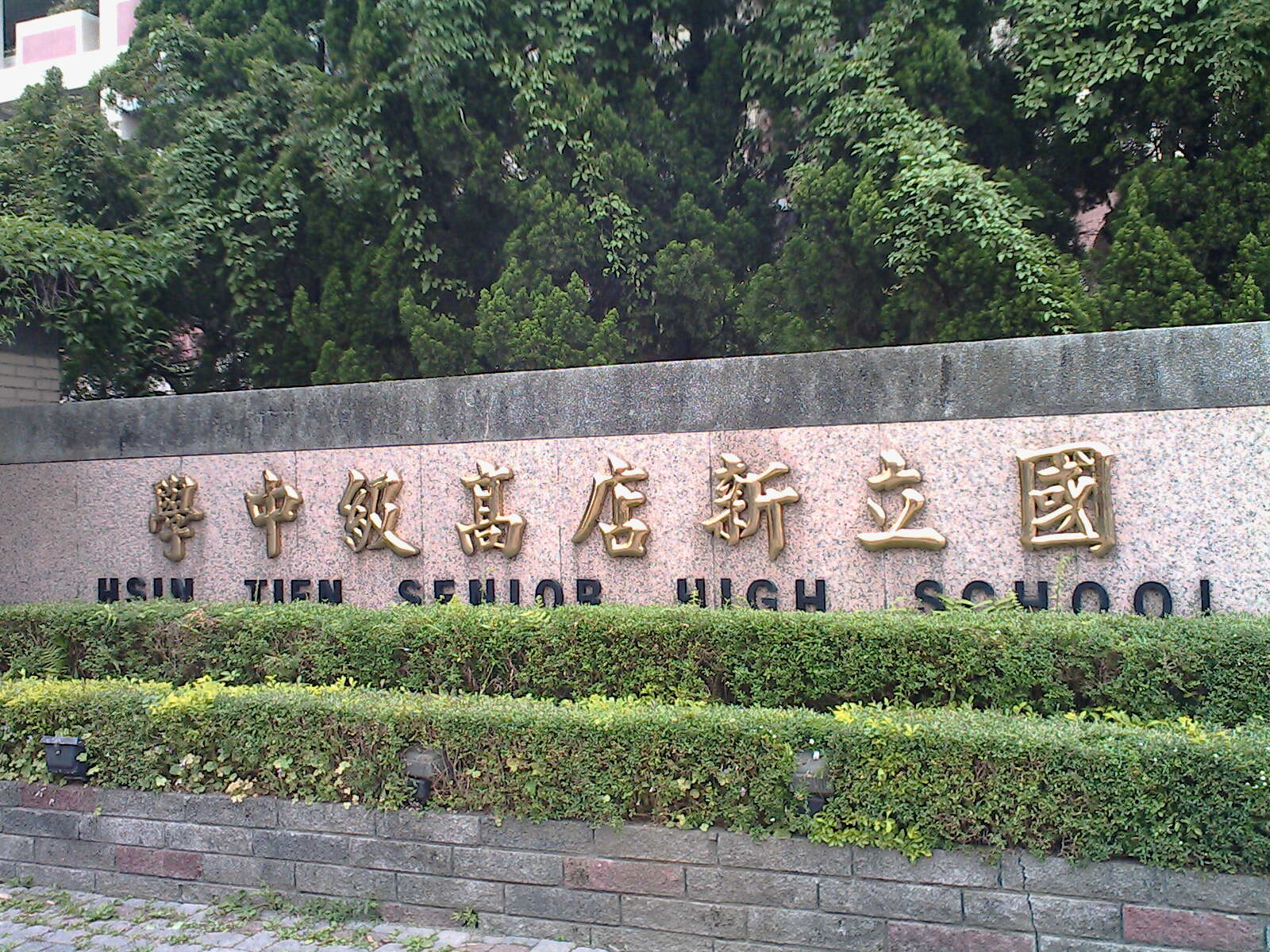
Hsin-Tien Senior High School.jpg

The New Taipei Municipal Hsin Tien Senior High School (Chinese: 新北市立新店高級中學) is a senior high school in Xindian District, New Taipei, Taiwan which was founded in 1992.

== School activities ==
- Chinese poem recital contest
- English singing contest
- Oath-taking ceremony for seniors
- International exchange with Japanese schools
- Foreign exchange programs
- Club Performances
- Performances by the music class at National Music Hall
- Reading Club Presentations
- Volunteer camps
- Literature and Arts camps

== Transportation ==
The school is accessible within walking distance north of Xiaobitan Station of Taipei Metro.

== See also ==
- Education in Taiwan
