= Ankang station =

Ankang (Chinese: 安康; pinyin: Ānkāng) station may refer to the following stations:

- Ankang light rail station, a light rail station of the Ankang light rail
- Ankang railway station, a railway station of the Xiangyang–Chongqing railway, Xi'an–Ankang railway and Yangpingguan–Ankang railway
