= Ankeng LRT =

LRT system in Ankeng, Xindian District, New Taipei City

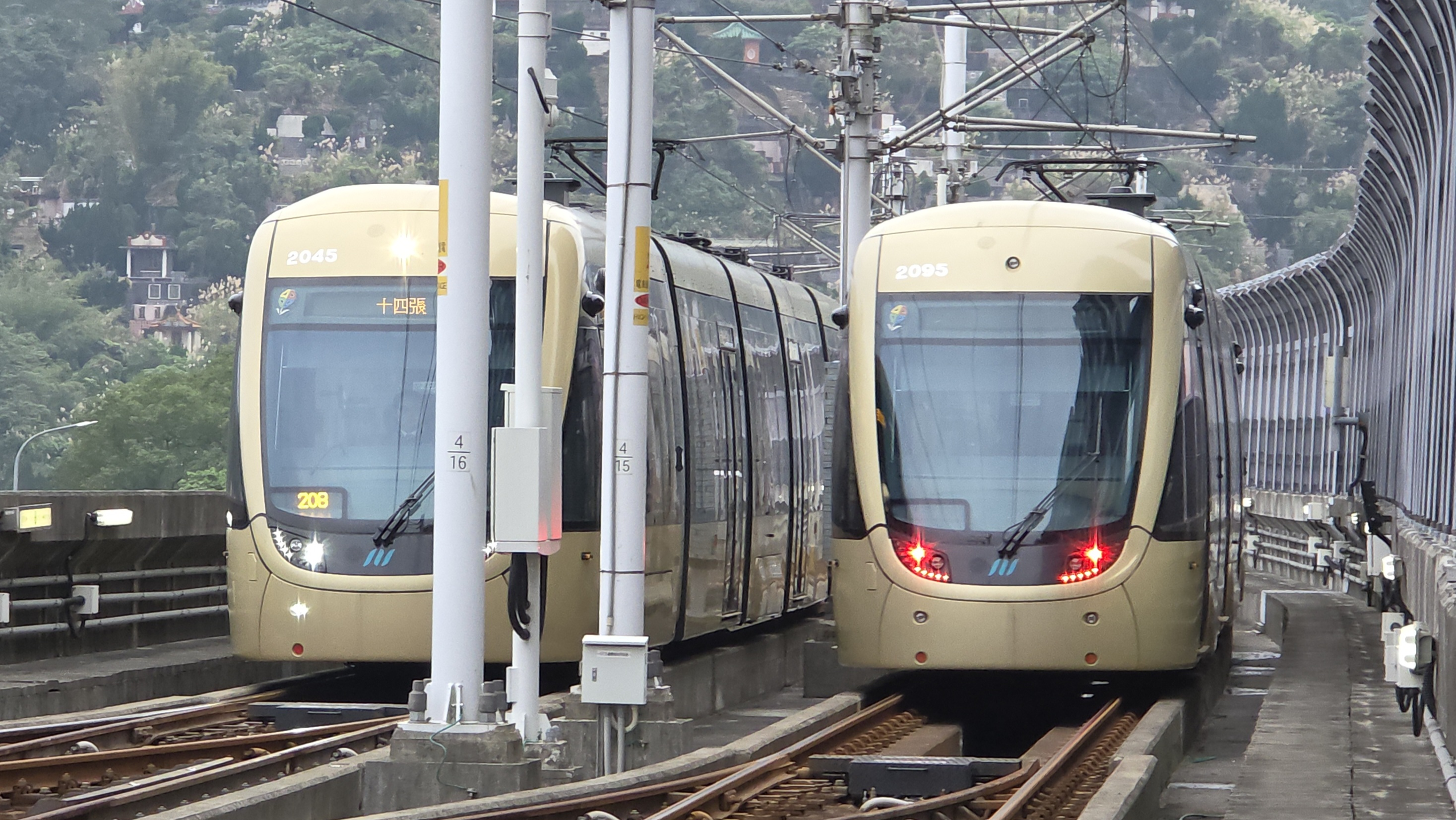
- Ankeng LRT trams near Ankang, on January 7, 2026

Overview
- Native name: 安坑輕軌
- Status: In service
- Owner: New Taipei DORTS
- Line number: K
- Locale: Xindian, New Taipei City, Taiwan
- Termini: Shuangcheng; Shisizhang
- Stations: 9
- Color on map: Khaki

Service
- Type: Light rail
- System: New Taipei Metro
- Operator: New Taipei Metro Co.
- Depot: Ankeng Depot
- Rolling stock: Ankeng LRV

History
- Opened: 10 February 2023

Technical
- Line length: 7.67 km (4.77 mi)
- Num of tracks: 2
- Character: Ground level, elevated
- Track gauge: 1,435 mm (4 ft 8 1/2 in) standard gauge

The Ankeng LRT (Chinese: 安坑輕軌; code K) is a light rail transit (LRT) line in Xindian District, New Taipei City, Taiwan, operated by New Taipei Metro. The route begins in Shuangcheng, terminating at Shisizhang where it links with the Circular line. The line is known in the New Taipei Metro system as the Khaki line, or line K. It opened on 10 February 2023 and began service the following day. The rolling stock for the line is produced in Taiwan.

The trams on the Ankeng LRT are a partial battery-powered tram service, with some parts - especially the road running areas - battery powered while the rest is via overhead line electrification catenary at 750V DC. The line uses trams from the Taiwan Rolling Stock Company, most likely the same type of trams used for the Danhai light rail.

Construction started around April 2016 on the road level part between Shuangcheng and Jinwen University of Science and Technology stations, with the first tracks laid in November 2018.

A depot is located just past Shuangcheng station, near Antai Road. The depot is built on (or on the side of) a mountain, with a single bore tunnel capable of two tracks inside going through the mountain to arrive at Shuangcheng station, The train yard construction site is visible on Google Maps.

As of September 2022, the line was 92.54% complete. As of December 2021, the elevated section was still under construction, although the Anxin bridge over the Xindian river was 98.13% completed. As of February 2022, the first trams had arrived and entered testing on the track.

On February 10, 2023, the Ankeng LRT officially started operations and passengers could ride for free during the first month.

== Stations ==
Code	Station name	Station type		Locale		Sta. distance (km)		Opened date	Transfer
Code	Station name	Structure	Platform	Locale		Previous	Total	Opened date	Transfer
Ankeng LRT
K01	Shuangcheng 雙城	Ground	Side	Xindian	New Taipei	—N/a	0.000	2023-2-10	—N/a
K02	Rose China Town 玫瑰中國城	Elevated	Island	Xindian	New Taipei	0.622	0.622	2023-2-10	—N/a
K03	Taipei Xiaocheng 台北小城	Ground	Side	Xindian	New Taipei	0.669	1.291	2023-2-10	—N/a
K04	Cardinal Tien Hospital Ankang Branch 耕莘安康院區	Ground	Side	Xindian	New Taipei	0.520	1.811	2023-2-10	—N/a
K05	Jinwen University of Science and Technology 景文科大	Ground	Side	Xindian	New Taipei	0.660	2.471	2023-2-10	—N/a
K06	Ankang 安康	Elevated	Hybrid	Xindian	New Taipei	1.345	3.816	2023-2-10	—N/a
K07	Sunshine Sports Park 陽光運動公園	Elevated	Side	Xindian	New Taipei	0.860	4.676	2023-2-10	—N/a
K08	Xinhe Elementary School 新和國小	Elevated	Side	Xindian	New Taipei	1.425	6.101	2023-2-10	—N/a
K09	Shisizhang 十四張	Elevated	Island	Xindian	New Taipei	1.097	7.198	2023-2-10	Circular Line

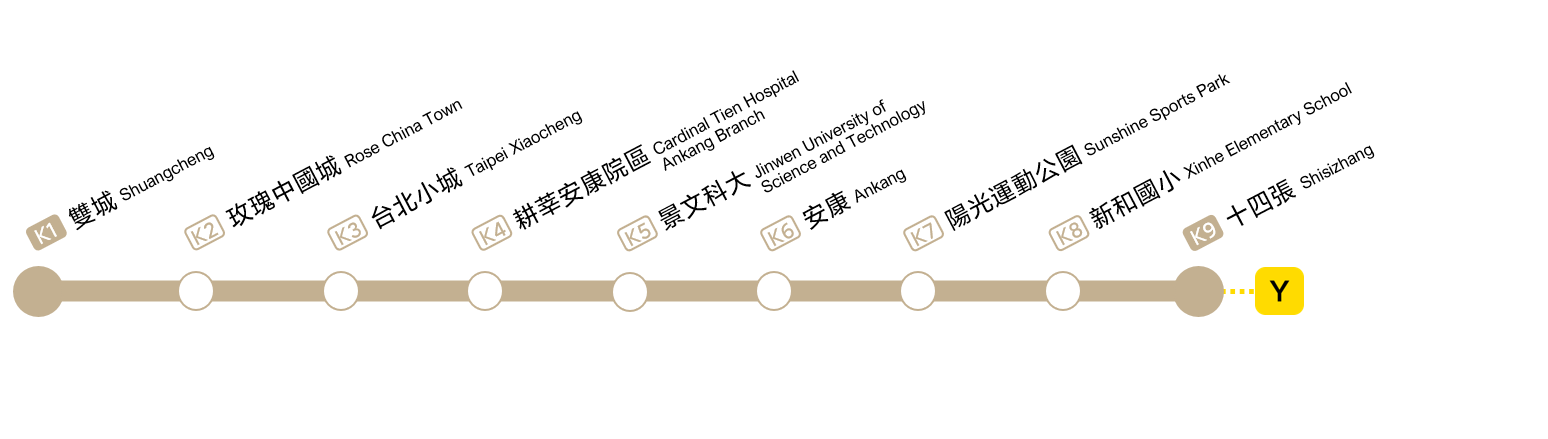

== Fares ==
Fares start at NT$20, and are modeled on the Danhai Light Rail's fares. Fees are charged according to the distance of the route: NT$20 for less than 5 kilometers, NT$25 for 5 to 8 kilometers, and NT$25 for one trip at most. The Frequent Passenger Program is also applicable, and there is a NT$50 discount for every NT$200 spent onboarding.

== See also ==
- Rail transport in Taiwan
- List of railway stations in Taiwan
- Danhai light rail
- Sanying line
