= National Science and Technology Center for Disaster Reduction =

Government agency of the Republic of China based in New Taipei, Taiwan

Coordinates: 24.984252°N 121.541354°E

- 國家災害防救科技中心

Agency overview
- Formed: July 2003
- Jurisdiction: Taiwan
- Headquarters: Xindian, New Taipei
- Agency executives: Chen Liang-chun, Director; Chen Hon-gey, Deputy Director
- Parent agency: Ministry of Science and Technology
- Website: Official website

The National Science and Technology Center for Disaster Reduction (NCDR; Chinese: 國家災害防救科技中心; pinyin: Guójiā Zāihài Fángjiù Kējì Zhōngxīn) is the agency under the Ministry of Science and Technology (Taiwan) serving as the technical adviser to the Executive Yuan on disaster prevention and reduction affairs.

== History ==
The legal basis for the establishment of the agency was the Disaster Prevention and Protection Act enacted in 2000. The agency was officially established in July 2003. In 2014, it became an administrative entity under the Ministry of Science and Technology.

== Organizational structure ==
- Meteorology Division
- Flood and Drought Disaster Reduction Division
- Slopeland Disaster Reduction Division
- Earthquake Disaster Reduction Division
- Technology and Manmade Disaster Reduction Division
- Management System and Policy Division
- Socio-Economic System Division
- Information Division
- Planning Division
- Administration Division

== Transportation ==
NCDR building is accessible within walking distance North of Dapinglin Station of Taipei Metro.

== Awards ==
In 2023, NCDR received the Zero Project Award for an innovative disaster preparedness handbook for persons with disabilities.
