= Danhai LRV =

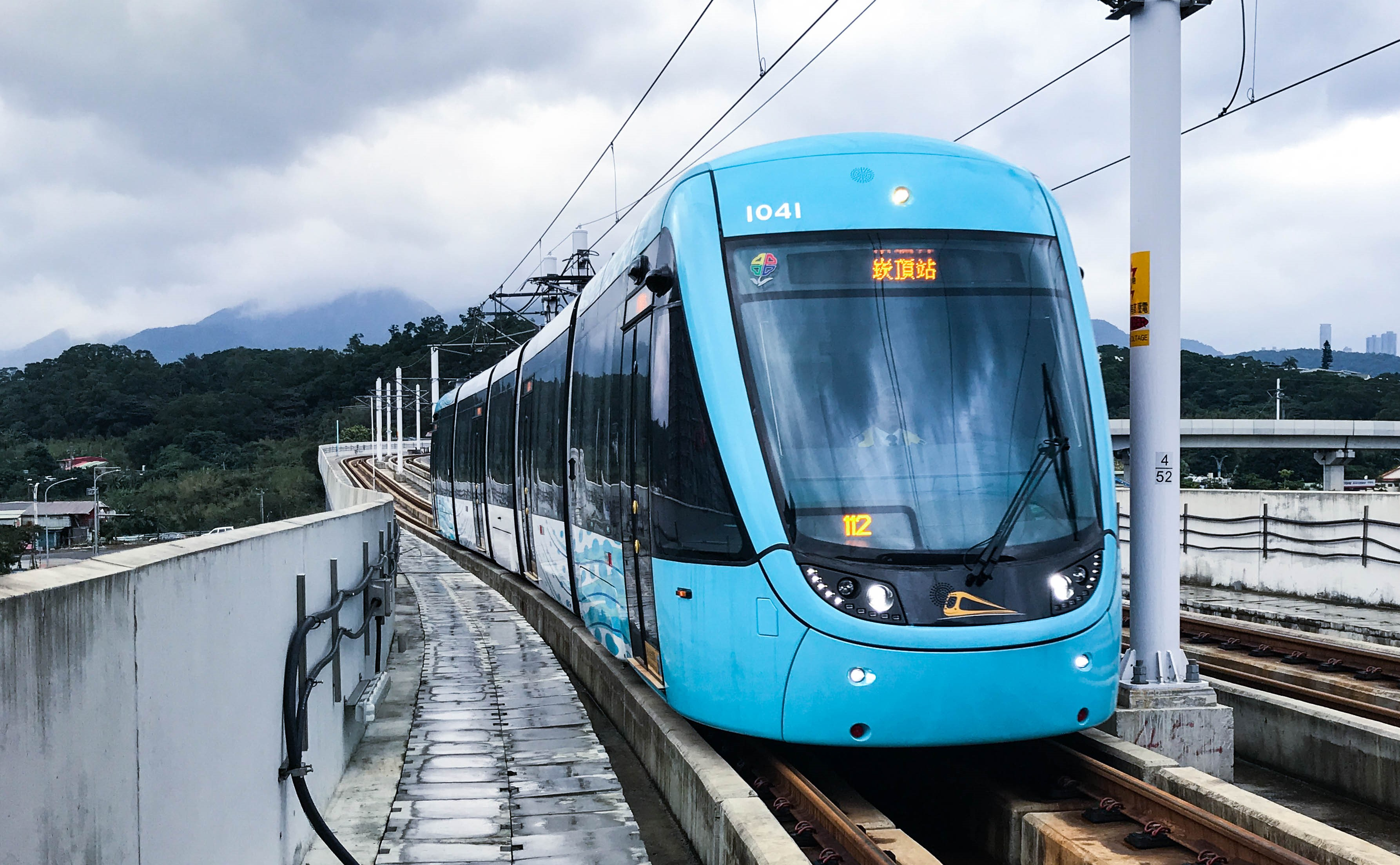
- A Danhai LRV train at Tamsui District Office
- In service: 2018–present
- Manufacturer: Taiwan Rolling Stock Company
- Constructed: 2016–2017
- Entered service: 23 December 2018
- Number built: 75 cars (15 sets)
- Number in service: 75 cars (15 sets)
- Formation: 5-module sets
- Fleet numbers: 1011–1155
- Capacity: 265
- Operator: New Taipei Metro Corporation
- Depot: Danhai Depot
- Line served: Danhai LRT

Specifications
- Car body construction: Steel, Aluminium
- Train length: 34,450 mm (113 ft 0 in)
- Width: 2,650 mm (8 ft 8 in)
- Height: 3,750 mm (12 ft 4 in)
- Doors: 4 per set
- Maximum speed: 70 km/h (43 mph) (with overhead power); 50 km/h (31 mph) (with battery power)
- Acceleration: 1.1 m/s^{2} (3.6 ft/s^{2})
- Deceleration: 1.2 m/s^{2} (3.9 ft/s^{2}) (service); 2.8 m/s^{2} (9.2 ft/s^{2}) (emergency)
- Current collection: Pantograph
- UIC classification: Bo′+0′+2′+0′+Bo′

The Danhai Light Rail EMU (Chinese: 淡海輕軌電聯車), nicknamed Warrior (Chinese: 行武者號) is a light rail train operating on New Taipei Metro's Danhai Light Rail line. A total of 15 5-module train sets were manufactured by Taiwan Rolling Stock Company (TRSC), along with assistance from Voith's Engineering Services located in Germany. The entirely domestic production of the Danhai LRV is an important milestone for Taiwan in moving towards domestically manufactured trains.

The first trainset finished production in late-2016, with the rest of the order being completed by 2017 in time for the Danhai Light Rail line's opening in December 2018.

== Nickname ==
In 2015, the New Taipei City Transportation Government Bureau held a public vote for the design theme of the train, with the three options being "Star of Wisdom (智多星)", "Warrior (行武者)", and "Spirit of the Sea (海精靈)". The "Warrior" theme, originally planned with a yellow colour scheme, won with 37.48% of votes, however, the designer of the train later changed the colour scheme to a light blue colour to reflect the line's seaside characteristic.

== Design ==
The train's design is similar to the counterparts used in Kaohsuing, both using modular carriages. The third module serves as the middle, with symmetrical designs at the front and rear. Modules 2 and 4 are bogie-less and are connected to other carriages via articulated joints. Only the first, third, and fifth modules have bogies. The train's design allows for future expansion by adding modules when the future passenger demand increases.

=== Exterior design ===
The main body of the train is constructed of a mix of stainless and weathering steel. The driver's cab window has a full curved glass, and has a LED display on the top indicating the destination of the train, along with another, smaller LED display in the bottom left indicating the train run number. Each entryway door are double panel doors, with LED displays being located above the doors also displaying the destination. For safety, bogie covers are installed on the sides of the bogies. In terms of paint, the front of the train is painted with a light blue background and oval color blocks, while the middle section is painted with a pure white background and the glass frame is surrounded by black color blocks.

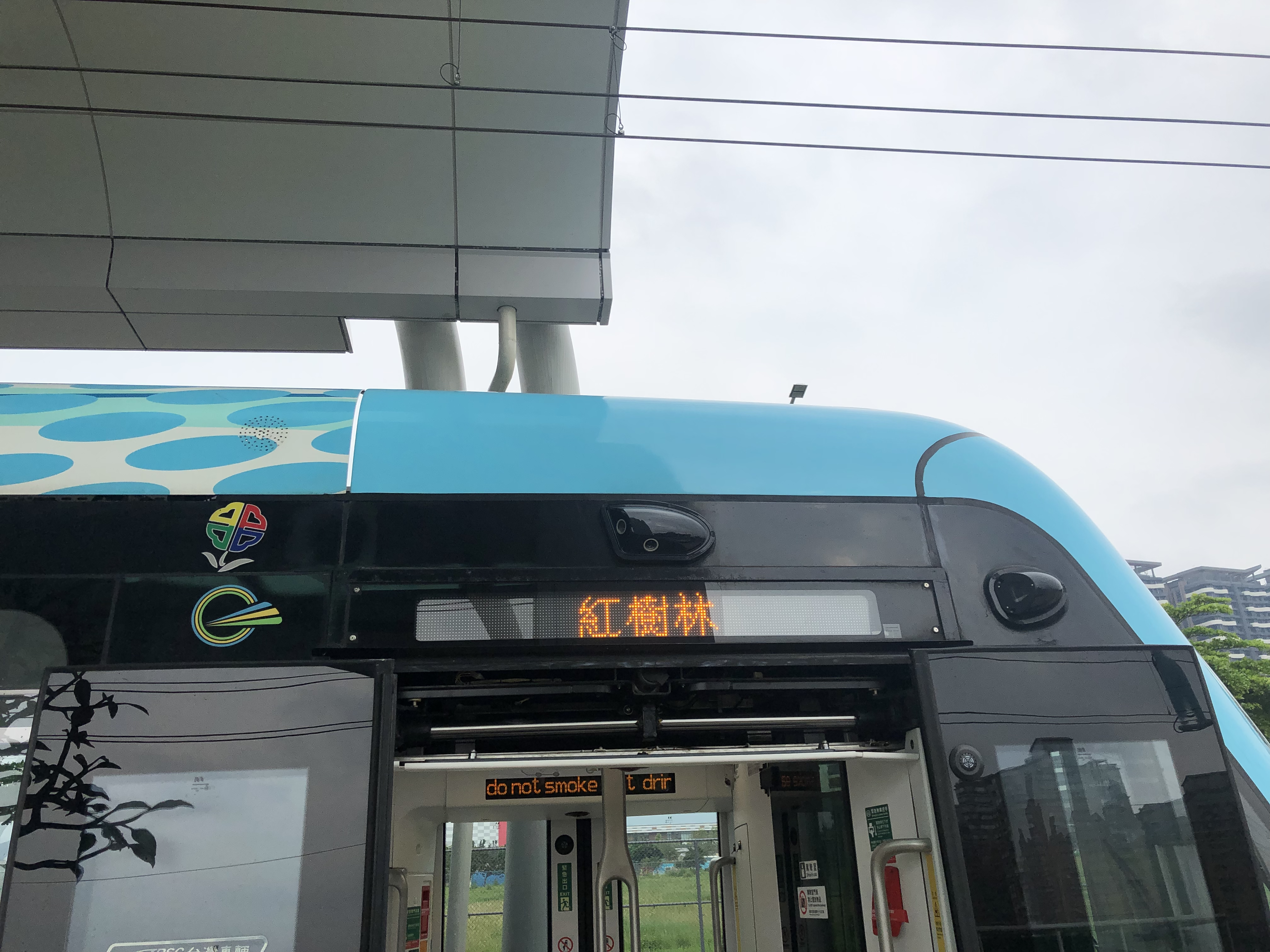
Destination indicator above doors

=== Interior design ===
The interior features a mostly low-floor design, with ergonomically designed seats. Some seats are arranged laterally due to the location of bogies, and steps are provided due to their high placement. Just like the exterior, the seats are designed in a blue color scheme, and there are handles above the seat back, thus replacing additional handles through the train. For lighting, both the interior and exterior of the train make use LED lights, and large viewing windows are provided for bright illumination and exterior views. There is a double forked pillar between each pair of doors for better grip, and to draw people away from leaning against and directly clogging the doors. The height of handrails in the accessible areas are lowered to make it easier for people with disabilities and children to grasp onto.

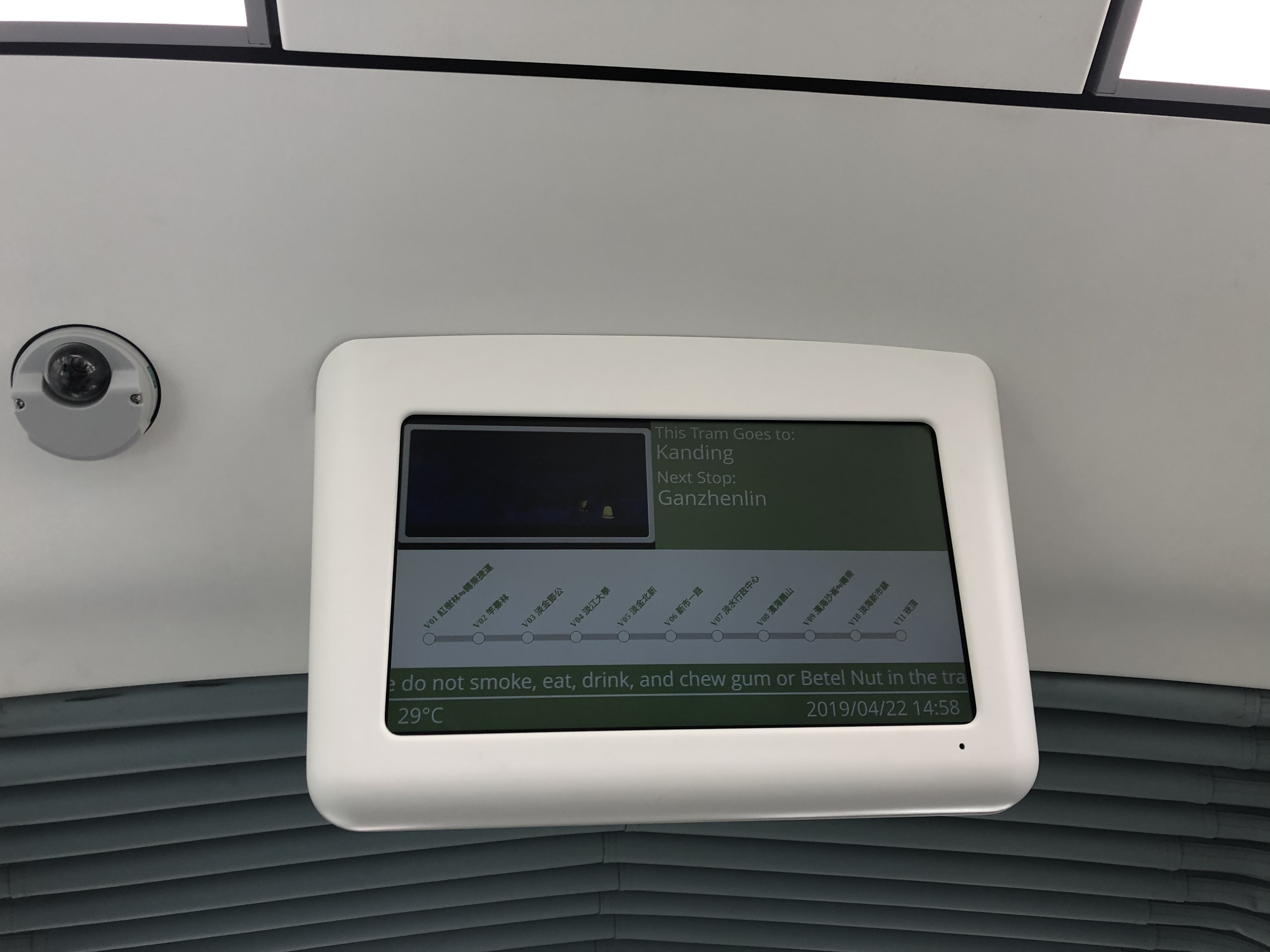
Interior passenger information display

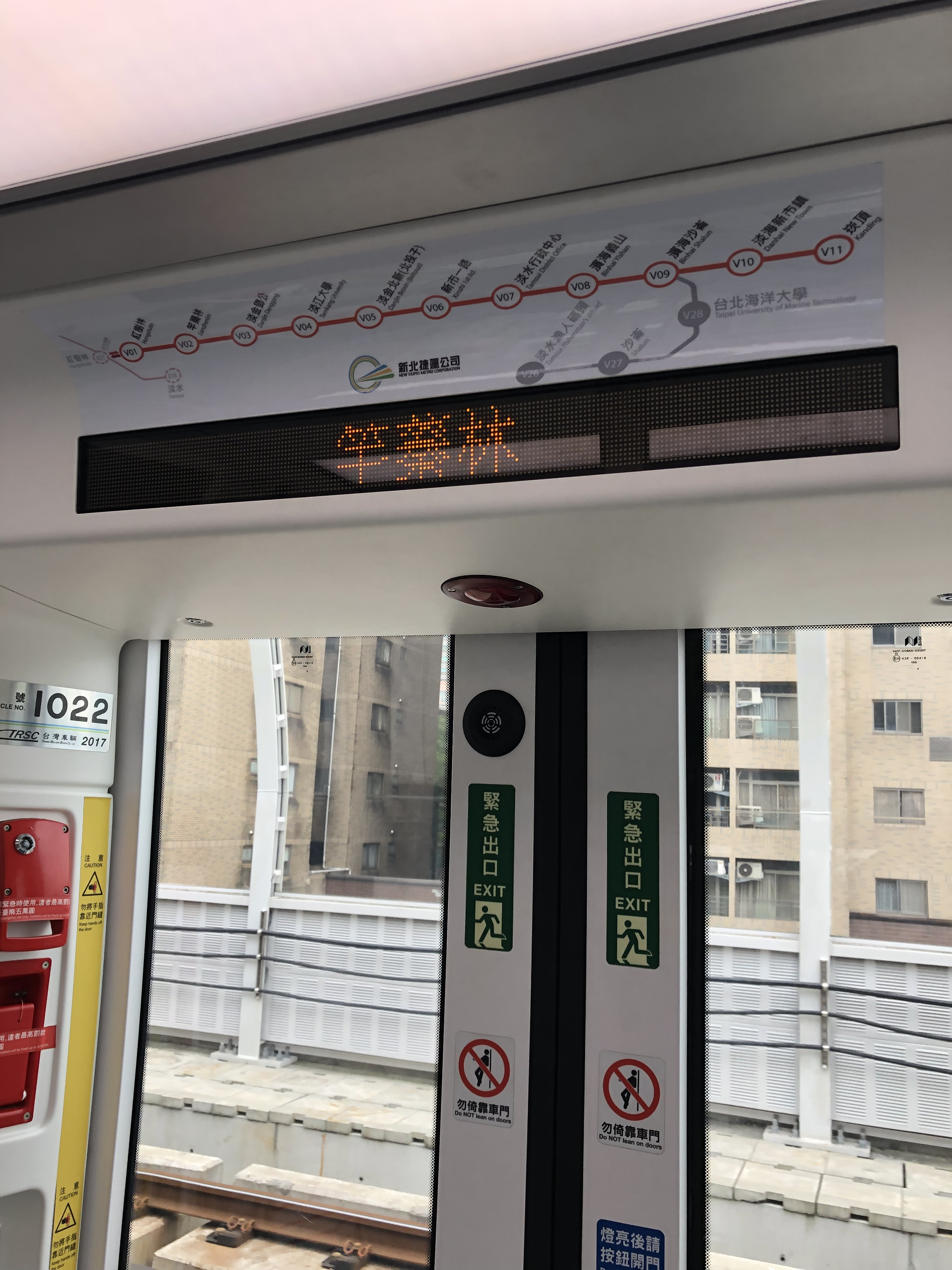
Traveller information and route map above door

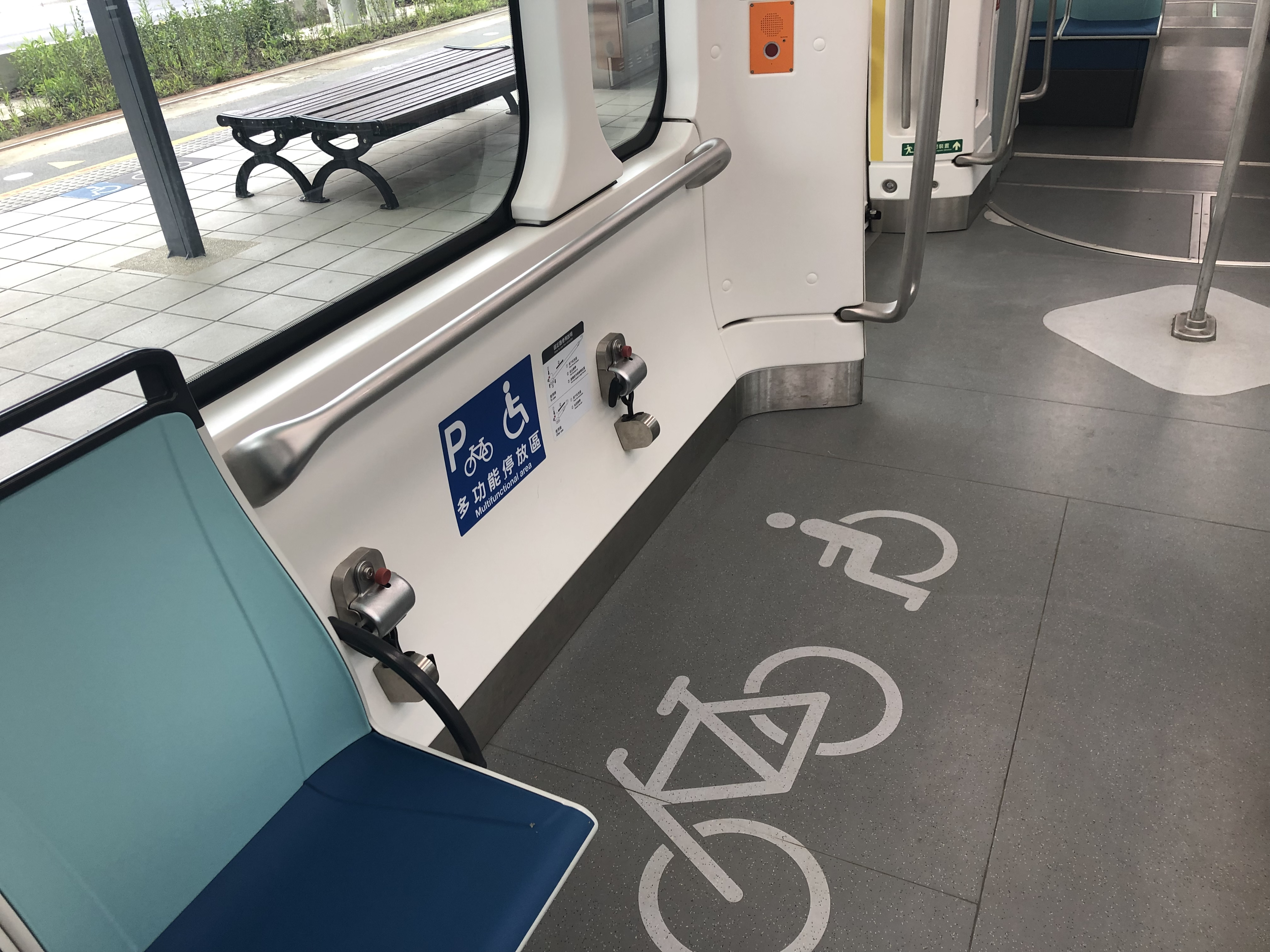
Multipurpose-use space in even-numbered cars

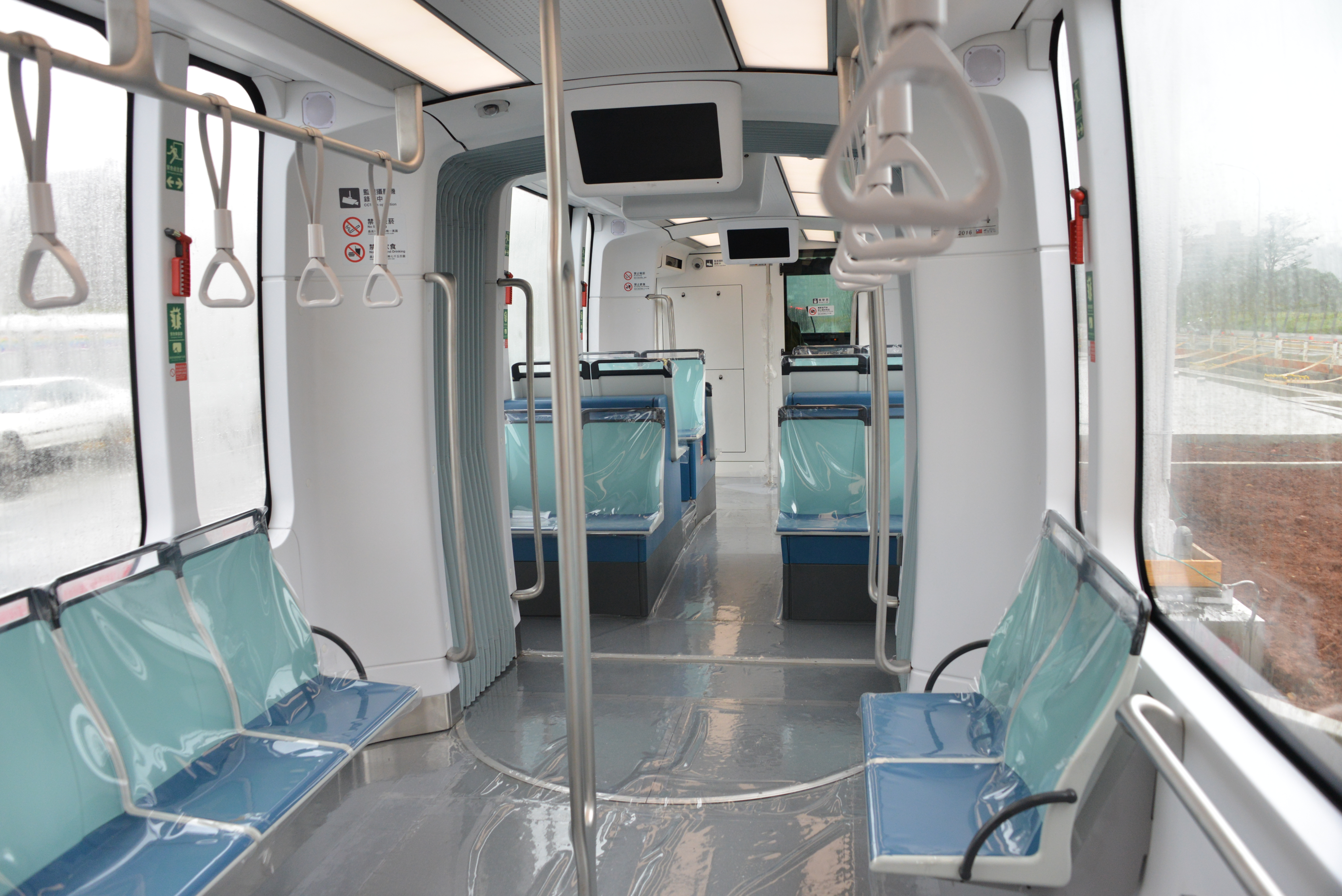
Longitudinal seating in even-numbered cars

== Formation ==
		← Kanding/Tamsui Fisherman's Wharf Hongshulin →					Key: ：Barrier-free Space; ：Bicycle Storage Area; ：Free Wi-Fi
Car No.		1	2	3	4	5	Key: ：Barrier-free Space; ：Bicycle Storage Area; ：Free Wi-Fi
Equipment		VVVF	Battery	Single Arm Pantograph	Battery	VVVF	Key: ：Barrier-free Space; ：Bicycle Storage Area; ：Free Wi-Fi
Trolley Type		Power		No power		Power	Key: ：Barrier-free Space; ：Bicycle Storage Area; ：Free Wi-Fi
Car Amenities		Door,	Door,,,		Door,,,	Door,	Key: ：Barrier-free Space; ：Bicycle Storage Area; ：Free Wi-Fi
Seating Arrangement		Horizontal	Directional	Horizontal	Directional	Horizontal	Key: ：Barrier-free Space; ：Bicycle Storage Area; ：Free Wi-Fi
Seating Capacity		62					Key: ：Barrier-free Space; ：Bicycle Storage Area; ：Free Wi-Fi
Maximum Capacity		265					Key: ：Barrier-free Space; ：Bicycle Storage Area; ：Free Wi-Fi
Train NumberYear Produced	～2018	1011 : 1071	1012 : 1072	1013 : 1073	1014 : 1074	1015 : 1075	Key: ：Barrier-free Space; ：Bicycle Storage Area; ：Free Wi-Fi
Train NumberYear Produced	～Oct. 2019	1081 : 1151	1082 : 1152	1083 : 1153	1084 : 1154	1085 : 1155	Key: ：Barrier-free Space; ：Bicycle Storage Area; ：Free Wi-Fi
