= Dapinglin metro station =

Metro station in New Taipei, Taiwan

Dapinglin / 大坪林
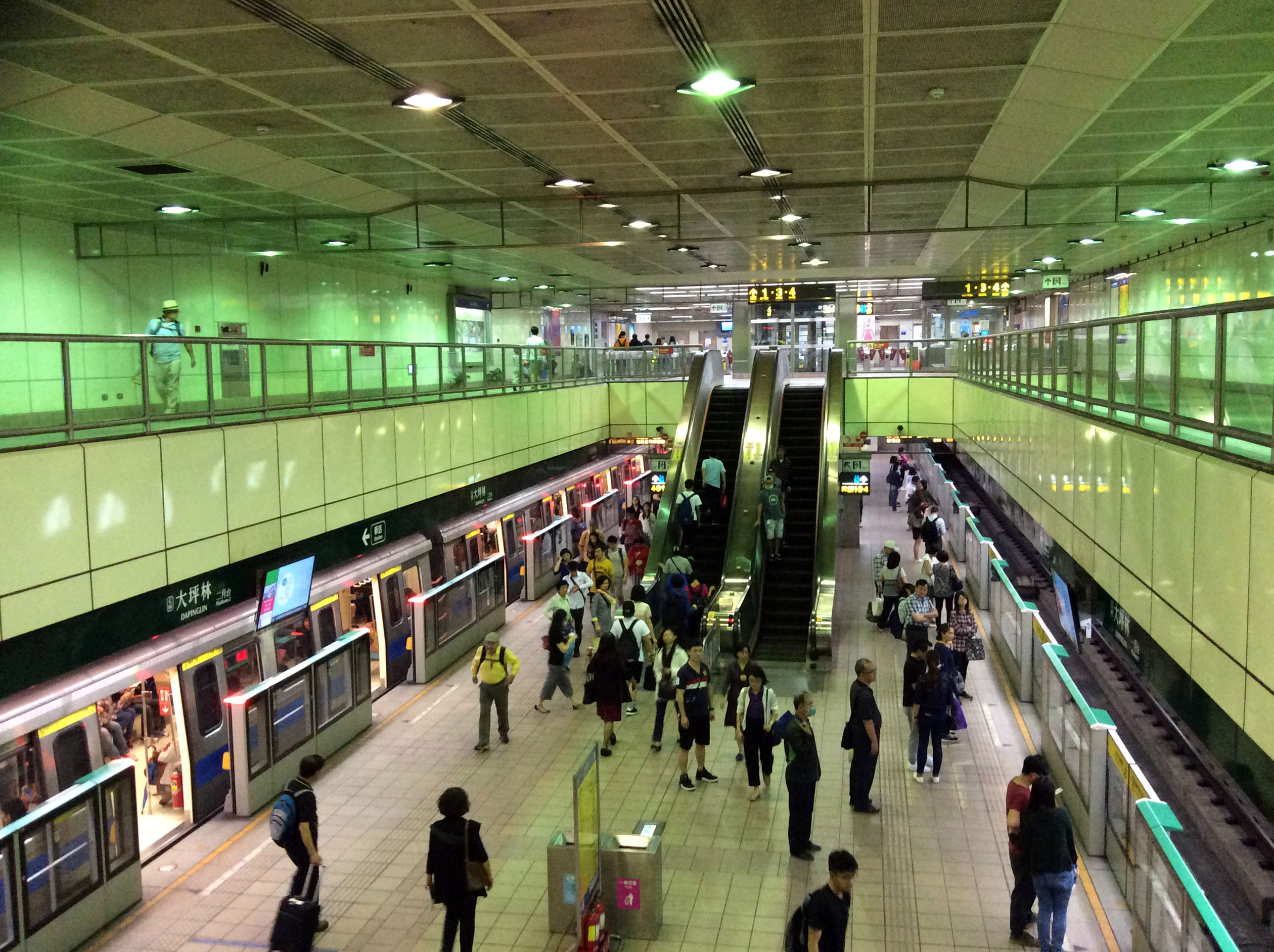
- Green line platform

Chinese name
- Chinese: 大坪林
Transcriptions
Standard Mandarin
- Hanyu Pinyin: Dàpínglín
- Bopomofo: ㄉㄚˋ ㄆㄧㄥˊ ㄌㄧㄣˊ
- Wade–Giles: Ta⁴ P'ing²-lin²
Hakka
- Pha̍k-fa-sṳ: Thai-phiàng-lìm
Southern Min
- Tâi-lô: Tuā-pînn-nâ

General information
- Location: No. 190, Sec. 3, Beixin Rd. Xindian, New Taipei; Taiwan
- Coordinates: 24.982939°N 121.541362°E
- Operated by: Taipei Metro, New Taipei Metro (until June 2030)
- Lines: Songshan–Xindian line; Circular line
- Platforms: 2 island platforms
- Tracks: 4
- Connections: Bus stop

Construction
- Structure type: Underground

Other information
- Station code: ,

History
- Opened: 11 November 1999; 26 years ago

Passengers
- 53,198 daily (December 2024)
- Rank: (Ranked 31 of 119)

Services
Preceding station	Taipei Metro	Following station
Jingmei towards Songshan	Songshan–Xindian line	Qizhang towards Xindian
Preceding station	New Taipei Metro	Following station
Terminus	Circular line	Shisizhang towards New Taipei Industrial Park
Future services
Preceding station	New Taipei Metro	Following station
Baduocuo towards Taipei Zoo	Circular line Future Service	Shisizhang towards Jiannan Road
Location

The Taipei Metro and New Taipei Metro Dapinglin station (formerly transliterated as Ta Pinglin Station until 2003) is located in Xindian District, New Taipei, Taiwan. It is a station on the Songshan–Xindian line and the Circular line.

Circular line construction at the station began on 8 October 2010.

== Station overview ==
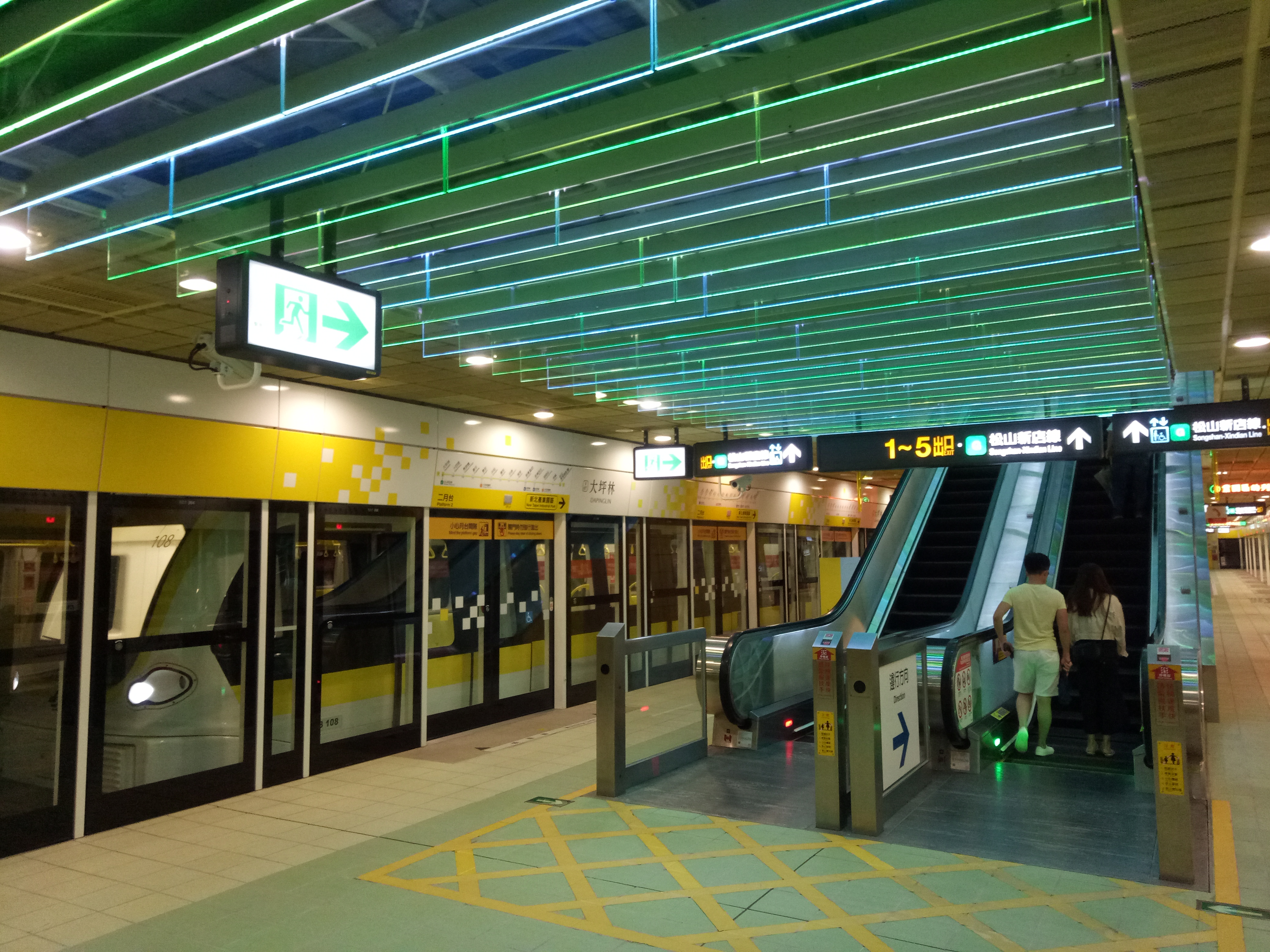
Circular line platform

This four-level, underground station has two island platforms and five exits.

Due to the plans for the Circular line being unknown during construction of the Xindian line, there was no space reserved for the transfer to the future Circular line. This can be noted in today's transfer route at Dapinglin station, where passengers from the Songshan–Xindian line (B2) transferring to the Circular line (B4) or vice versa need to go to the concourse (B1) first before transferring to the other line, whereas at Zhongxiao Xinsheng station, which had reserved space for transferring to the Xinzhuang line during the construction of the Nangang line, can go directly from the Nangang line (B2) to the Xinzhuang line (B3) or vice versa without having to go to the concourse (B1).

== Station History ==
- 11 November 1999: Station opens.
- 31 January 2020: The Circular line opens for service.

== Station layout ==
Street level	Entrance/exit	Entrance/exit
B1	Concourse	Lobby, information desk, automatic ticket dispensing machines, one-way faregates
B1	Concourse	Restrooms (south side, outside fare zone, near exit 3)
B2	Platform 1	← Songshan–Xindian line toward Songshan (G05 Jingmei)
B2	Island platform, doors will open on the left
B2	Platform 2	Songshan–Xindian line toward Xindian (G03 Qizhang) →
B4	Platform 1	← Circular line toward New Taipei Industrial Park (Y08 Shisizhang)
B4	Island platform, doors will open on the left, right
B4	Platform 2	← Circular line toward New Taipei Industrial Park (Y08 Shisizhang)

== Around the station ==
- Jing-Mei White Terror Memorial Park
- Muzha Riverside Park
