= New Taipei Metro =

Light rail/rapid transit system in Taiwan

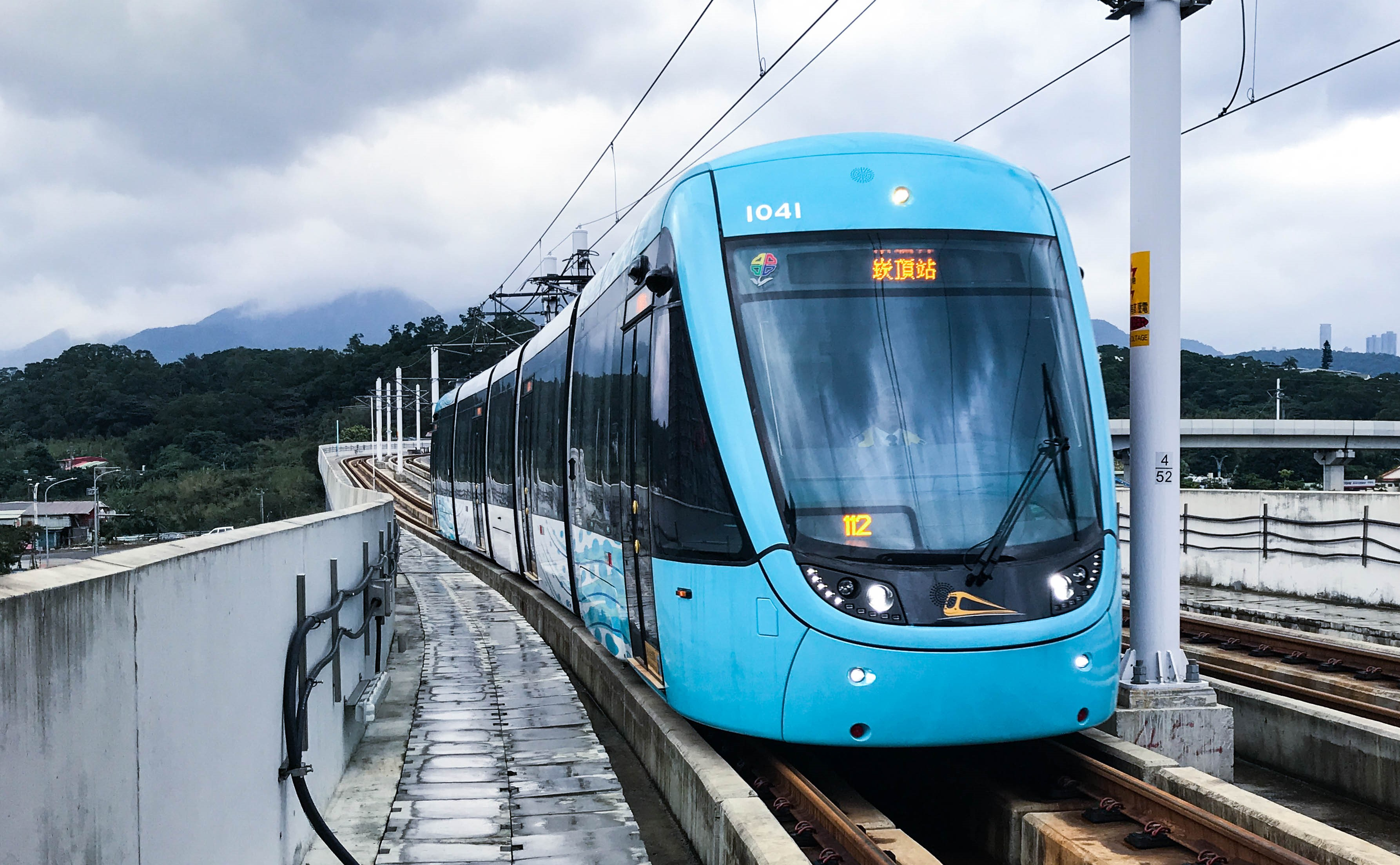
- Danhai light rail

Overview
- Native name: 新北捷運
- Owner: Department of Rapid Transit Systems, New Taipei City Government
- Area served: New Taipei City, Taipei
- Locale: New Taipei City
- Transit type: Light rail; Rapid transit
- Number of lines: 4 (Note: Including Circular line, a part of Taipei Metro system)
- Number of stations: 49
- Daily ridership: 82,522 (2025)
- Annual ridership: 30,090,000 (2025)
- Chief executive: Lin Youxian (林祐賢)
- Headquarters: New Taipei City
- Website: www.ntmetro.com.tw

Operation
- Began operation: December 12, 2018; 7 years ago (light rail); January 31, 2020; 6 years ago (rapid transit)
- Operator: New Taipei Metro Corporation
- Character: Elevated, underground, at-grade

Technical
- System length: 44.67 km (27.76 mi)
- Track gauge: 1,435 mm (4 ft 8 1/2 in) standard gauge
- Electrification: 750 V DC
Future system map
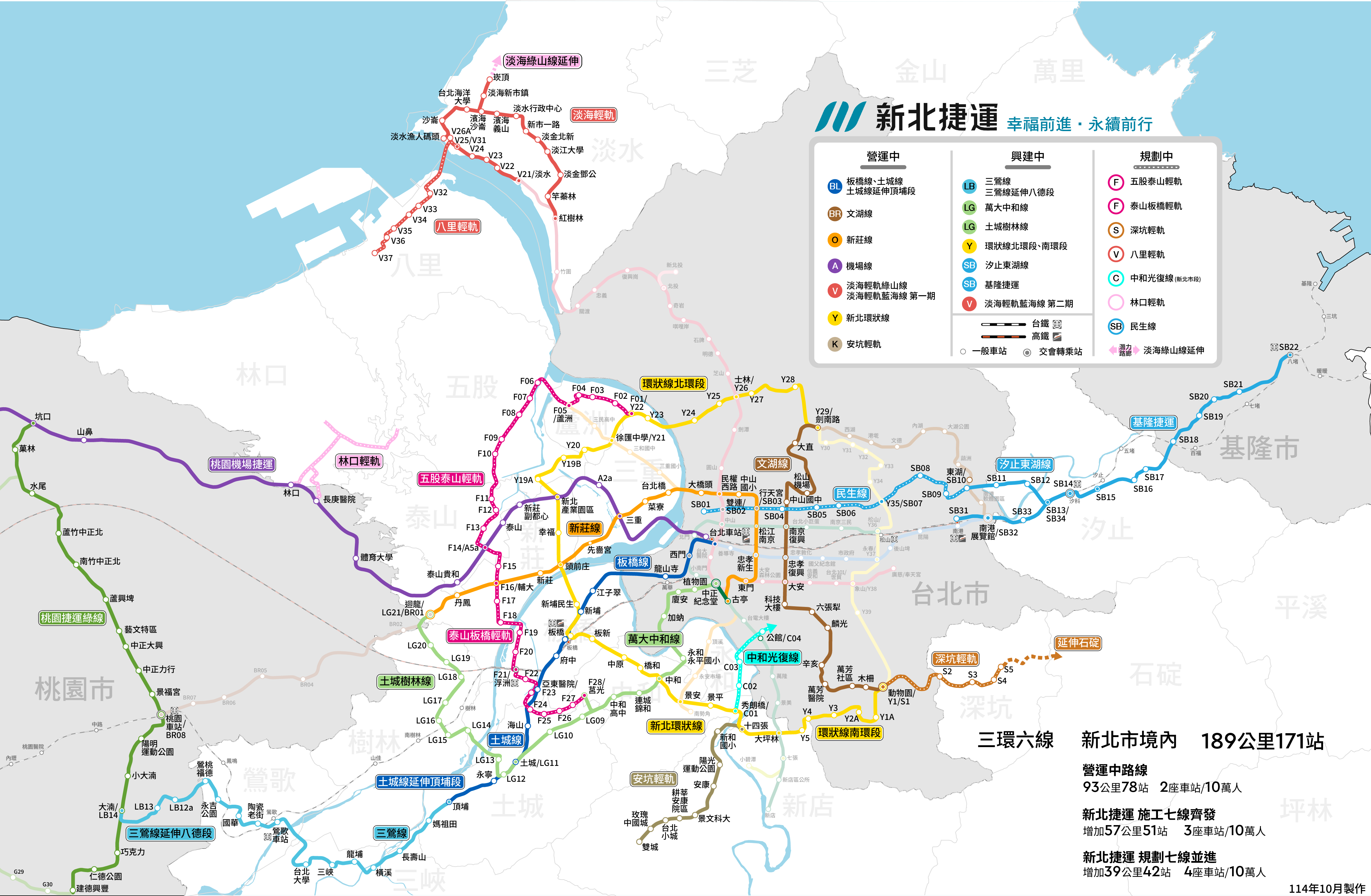

New Taipei Metro (Chinese: 新北捷運; pinyin: Xīnběi Jiéyùn; Zhuyin Fuhao: ㄒㄧㄣ ㄅㄟˇ ㄐㄧㄝˊ ㄩㄣˋ) is a transit system serving New Taipei, Taiwan, operated by New Taipei Metro Corporation. The Danhai light rail, Ankeng light rail, Circular line, and Sanying line are currently in operation, with further lines are in various planning stages. Currently, these services are connected to Taipei Metro but operate independently, with the exception of the Circular line which is completely integrated into the Taipei Metro system but operated by New Taipei Metro.

== Timeline of services ==
Line	Termini		Type	Date open	Length (km)	Stations
Danhai light rail	Kanding	Hongshulin	Light rail	December 23, 2018	7.3	14
Danhai light rail	Tamsui Fisherman's Wharf	Binhai Shalun	Light rail	November 21, 2020	7.3	14
Ankeng light rail	Shuangcheng	Shisizhang	Light rail	February 10, 2023	7.67	9
Circular line	Dapinglin	New Taipei Industrial Park	Light metro	January 31, 2020 (Note: The line was transferred from Taipei Metro to New Taipei Metro on May 5, 2023.)	15.4	14
Sanying line	Dingpu	Yingtao Fude	Light metro	June 30, 2026	14.3	12

== Lines ==
=== Danhai light rail ===
The Danhai light rail is a light rail transit (LRT) network located in Tamsui District, New Taipei, Taiwan. It opened on 24 December 2018. The network connects to the Taipei Metro at Hongshulin.

=== Ankeng light rail ===
Ankeng LRT serves the Xindian District (Ankeng) of New Taipei City by connecting the Circular line's Shisizhang metro station with Shuangcheng light rail station. Construction started around April 2016 and is well away on the road level part between station K1 and K5, with the first tracks having been laid in November 2018. As of October 2021 the project was 83.69% complete. From station K6 to K9 the tracks are elevated, as well as K2. As of June 2018, the entire section from station K1 to K6 is clearly visible on Google Maps running down the middle of Anyi Rd and then turning right onto Anjie Rd, passing through a cemetery and going across Ankang Road. As of September 2018, work has started on the bridge across the Xindian River to Shisizhang station. On February 10, 2023, the Ankeng LRT officially started operations and passengers could ride for free during the first month.

=== Circular line ===
On 31 January 2020, the Circular line opened. Stage I construction consists of 14 stations running from New Taipei Industrial Park on Taoyuan Airport MRT to Dapinglin on Songshan–Xindian Line and is about 15.4 km (9.6 mi) long. Electromechanical equipment for the line is supplied by Hitachi Rail STS, including driverless technology and CBTC Radio signalling. In February 2020, free rides were offered to passengers in order to raise awareness and test the route's popularity. On 5 May 2023, the Circular line was transferred from the Taipei Metro to the New Taipei Metro; however, the fare system is still integrated with the Taipei Metro. It is the first automated metro entirely within New Taipei City, with the only other driverless line in Greater Taipei currently in operation being the Wenhu line. The western section of the line officially opened on 31 January 2020. The line is currently 15.4 km (9.6 mi) long, with 14 stations. It uses CBTC Radio signalling from Ansaldo STS.

=== Sanying line ===
The Sanying line first section is 14.29 km (8.88 mi) long, has twelve stations and serving Tucheng, Sanxia and Yingge districts. The line shares the same terminus with the Taipei Metro Bannan Line's terminal station at Dingpu.

== Rolling stock ==
=== Light rail trains ===
The Danhai light rail uses its own rolling stock, which entered service in December 2018 with the opening of the first section. The Ankeng light rail uses its own rolling stock, similar to those used on the Danhai light rail, which entered service in February 2023 with the opening of the line. Both types of trains run on 1,435 mm (4 ft 8 1/2 in) standard gauge.

=== Rapid transit trains ===
The Hitachi Rail Italy Driverless Metro is used on the Circular Line, which entered service in January 2020 with the opening of the first section. Each train consists of a 4-car EMU set and with open-gangway connection between cars. The trains run on 1,435 mm (4 ft 8 1/2 in) standard gauge without onboard operators.

=== Fleet roster ===
==== Light rail fleet ====
Car type	Photo	Year built	Builder(s)	Train length (m)	Capacity (seated/standing)	Max. speed (Note: Design/service) (km/h)	Fleet total	Car set numbers	Line(s)	Depot(s)	Notes
Danhai LRV		2016-2017	TRSC	34.5	62/265	70 (overhead line)/50 (no overhead line)	15	1011–1155	Danhai light rail	Danhai	Open gangway connection
Ankeng LRV		2016-2023	TRSC	34.5	62/265	70 (overhead line)/50 (no overhead line)	15	2011–2155	Ankeng light rail	Ankeng	Open gangway connection

==== Rapid transit fleet ====
Car type	Photo	Year built	Builder(s)	Train length (m)	Capacity (seated/standing)	Max. speed (Note: Design/service) (km/h)	Fleet total	Car set numbers	Line(s)	Depot(s)	Notes
C610 (Driverless Metro)		2016	Hitachi Rail Italy, TRSC	68.43	24/650	90/80	68	101–117	Circular line (Taipei metropolitan area)	North, South	Open gangway connection
Hitachi Rail Italy Driverless Metro		2023	Hitachi Rail Italy			90/80	58	101–129	Sanying line	Sanxia	Open gangway connection

=== Engineering trains ===
New Taipei Metro also uses a fleet of specialised trains for maintenance of way purposes on the Circular line:

Car Type	Purpose	Builder	Max. speed (km/h)	Length (m)	Lines used on
Rescue locomotive	Rescue of passenger EMU or engineering trains	Bemo Rail	50	9.45	Circular line (Taipei metropolitan area)
Track maintenance vehicle	Track maintenance	Bemo Rail	25	5.86	Circular line (Taipei metropolitan area)
Road–rail vehicle	Track maintenance	Mercedes-Benz	50 (rail), 80 (road)	5.2	Circular line (Taipei metropolitan area)
Flatcar	Carrying maintenance equipment	Bemo Rail	—N/a	18	Circular line (Taipei metropolitan area)

=== Depots ===
The system currently has three depots, with more under construction.

Depot name	Year opened	Location	Rolling stock housed	Line(s) served
Danhai	2018	Tamsui, north of Kanding	Danhai LRV	Danhai light rail
South	2020	Xindian, north of Shisizhang	C610	Circular line (Taipei metropolitan area)
Ankeng	2023	Xindian, south of Shuangcheng	Ankeng LRV	Ankeng light rail
Sanxia	2026	Sanxia, west of Longpu	Sanying line EMU	

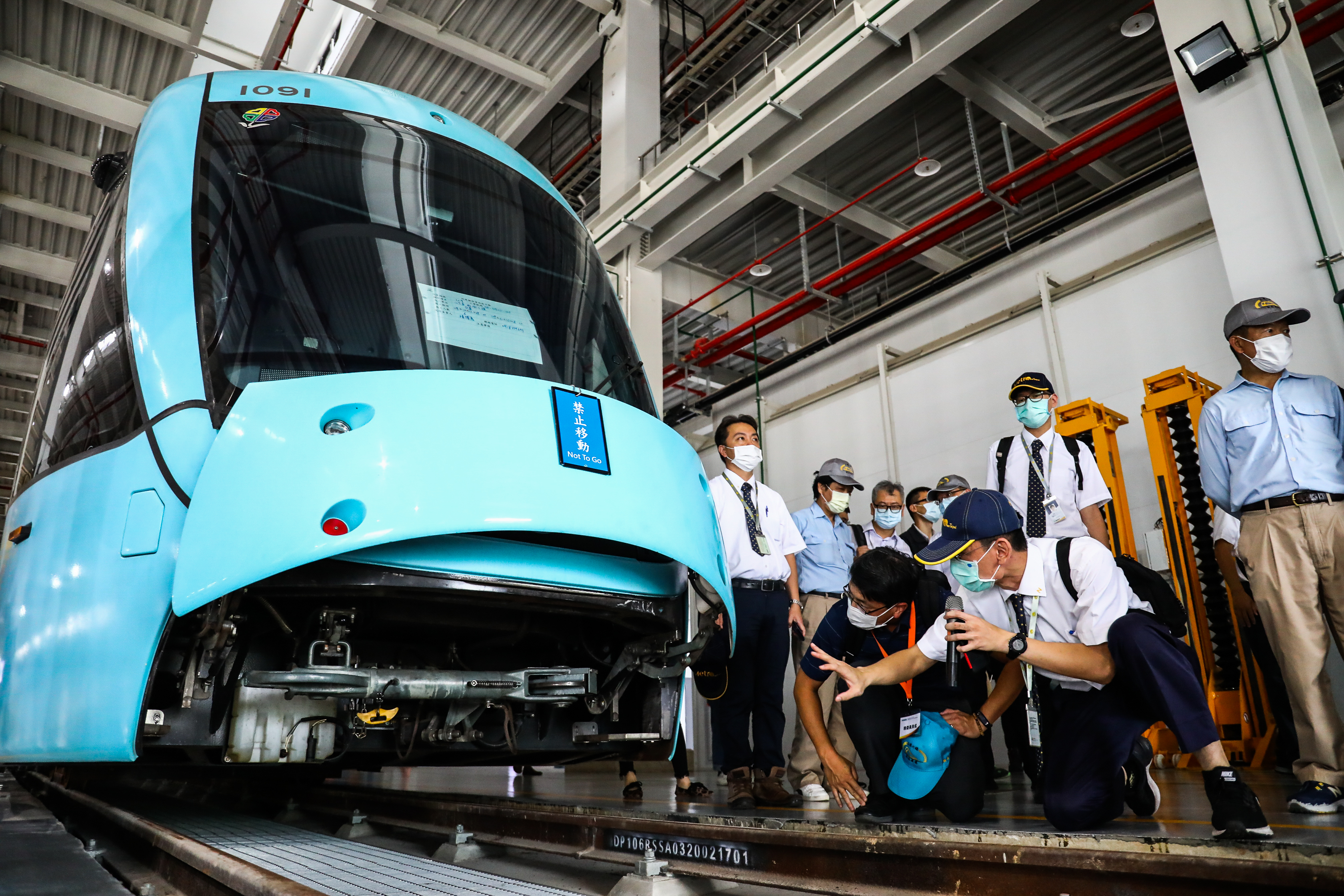
An LRV at Danhai Depot

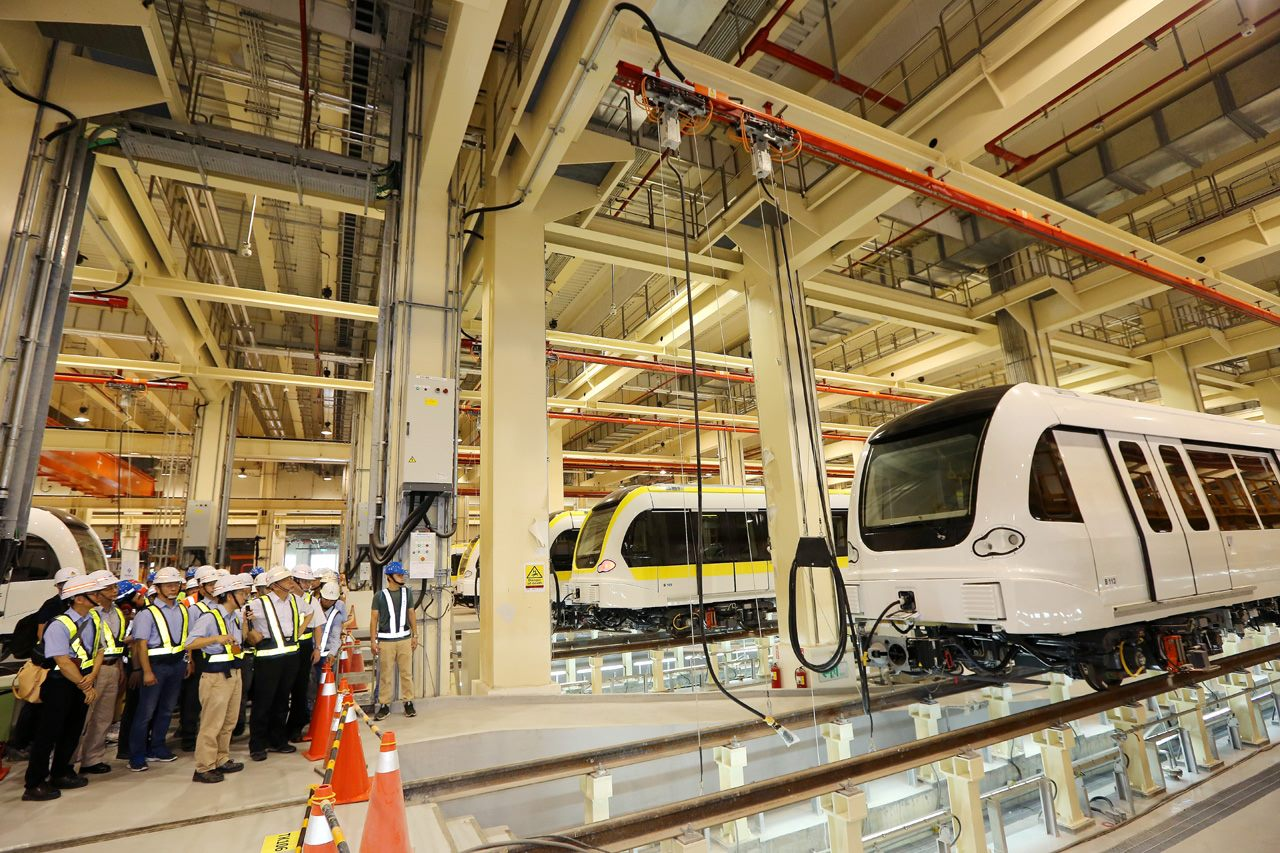
The workshop area of South Depot

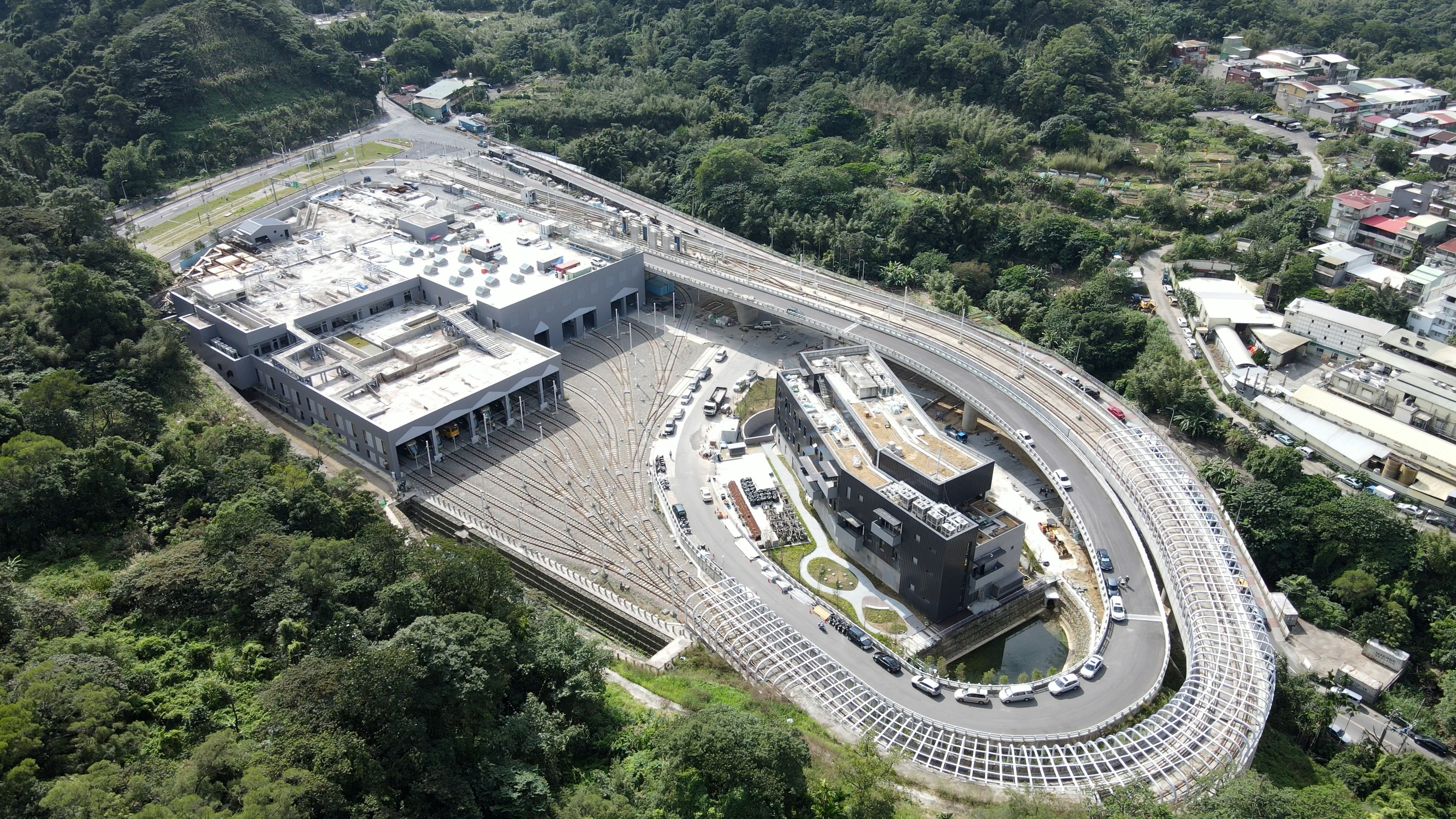
Aerial view of Ankeng Depot

== Future expansions ==
=== Sanying line extension ===
The Sanying line is planned to be extended to Bade District, Taoyuan with 2 stations and a length of 3.88 km (2.41 mi), terminating at Danan station on the under-construction Taoyuan Metro Green line, with the extension expected to be completed in 2034.

=== Danhai Light Rail extensions ===
==== Blue Coast Line Phase 2 ====
The 3.3 kilometre (2.1 mi) line would begin at Tamsui station and end at Tamsui Fisherman's Wharf, with 6 stations along the coast. Preliminary construction is underway and the line is expected to be completed in 2031.

==== Bali Light Rail ====
At 6.0 kilometres (3.7 mi) long with 7 stations, this line would begin at Youchekou (V25) station, interchange with Phase 1 of the Blue Coast Line at Tamsui Fisherman's Wharf, and use the under-construction Tamkang Bridge to cross the Tamsui River and serve Bali District. The line is currently undergoing feasibility studies.

=== Xizhi-Donghu line ===
In 2020, it was decided that the eastern section of the proposed Misheng-Xizhi line of the Taipei Metro would be built first from Donghu to Xizhi District Office under the purview of New Taipei Metro, now called the Xizhi-Donghu line. It would interline with the Keelung Metro (upgraded from light rail to a medium-capacity metro) and share a depot at Shehou. In 2023, it received final approval from the Executive Yuan, and broke ground on 20 March 2025, with expected completion in 2032.

=== Shenkeng light rail ===
The Shenkeng light rail is a planned light rail system with 5 stations and 5.8 kilometres (3.6 mi) in length, serving Wenshan and Shenkeng districts. The route will head eastwards from Taipei Zoo through Shenkeng District, terminating at the eastern edge of the town, with the possibility of extending further to Shiding Service Area on National Freeway 5 at a later stage. It is currently undergoing feasibility studies.

=== Wugu–Taishan light rail ===
The Wugu–Taishan light rail is a planned light rail system in the Sanchong, Luzhou, Wugu and Taishan districts. The route begins from Jixian Environmental Park, passing through Luzhou, Wugu, and Taishan, terminating at a location between Taishan metro station (A5) and Taishan Guihe metro station (A6) on the Taoyuan Airport MRT. A new infill station (tentative name: Wenzizun, station code: A5a) is planned to be constructed on the Taoyuan Airport MRT to enable transfers with the light rail system.

An extension to Banqiao District is also being planned, known as the Taishan–Banqiao light rail, and would terminate at Juguang station on the under-construction Wanda-Shulin line.

== See also ==
- Department of Rapid Transit Systems, New Taipei City Government
- Rail transport in Taiwan
