= Xindian District =

District of New Taipei, Taiwan

Xindian 新店區 Shinten, Sindian, Sintien, Hsintien, Hsin-tien
- District
- Xindian District
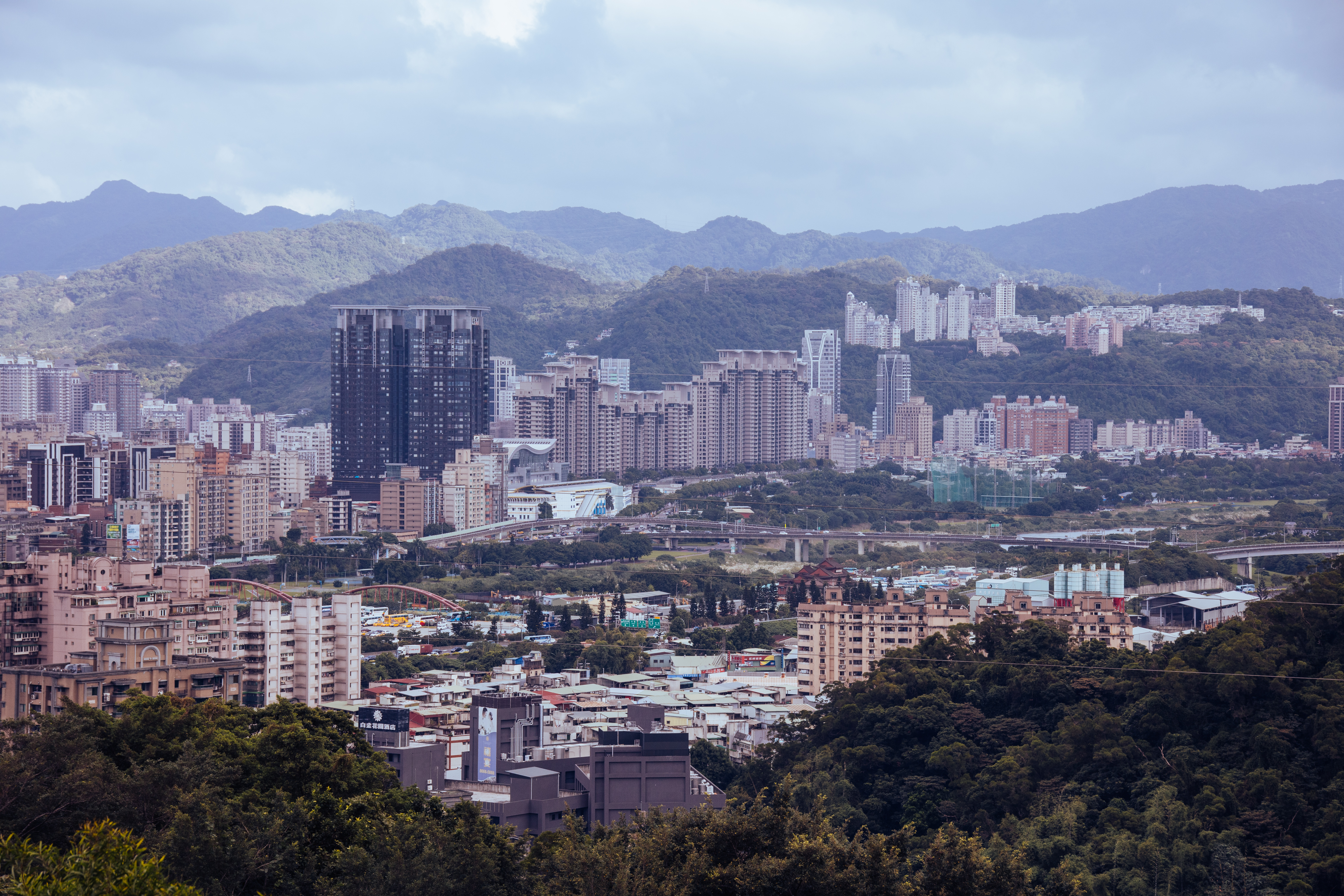
- Xindian skyline in 2020

- Location of Xindian within New Taipei City
- Coordinates: 24°57′N 121°32′E
- Country: Republic of China (Taiwan)
- Region: Northern Taiwan
- Special municipality: New Taipei City

Area
  - Total: 120.2255 km^{2} (46.4193 sq mi)

Population (February 2023)
  - Total: 300,178
  - Density: 2,496.79/km^{2} (6,466.66/sq mi)
- Time zone: UTC+8 (CST)
- Postal code: 231
- Website: www.xindian.ntpc.gov.tw (in Chinese)

Xindian District
- Chinese: 新店區
Transcriptions
Standard Mandarin
- Hanyu Pinyin: Xīndiàn Qū
- Tongyong Pinyin: Sindiàn Cyu
- MPS2: Shindian Chiu
Yue: Cantonese
- Jyutping: san^{1} dim^{3} keoi^{1}
Southern Min
- Hokkien POJ: Sin-tiàm-khu

Xindian District (Chinese: 新店區; pinyin: Xīndiàn Qū) is an inner city district in the southern part of New Taipei City, Taiwan.

== Name ==
Xindian's name originated during the Qing Dynasty close to 300 years ago. According to legend, a person named Lin and others came from Quanzhou, Fujian Province. On a mountain road leading to Wulai, they built a small cabin and opened a store selling groceries for the exchange of goods with mountain indigenous peoples. Since the store had no formal name, travelers called it Sintiam (Chinese: 新店; pinyin: Xīndiàn; Pe̍h-ōe-jī: Sin-tiàm; lit. 'new store').

An area usually not considered as part of Xindian is Ankeng (安坑), although it is within the jurisdiction of the district, located in a valley on the west side of the Xindian Creek. It was originally called Amkhe'ar (暗坑仔; Ànkēngzǎi; Àm-kheⁿ-á; 'dark/secret gorge'), due to luxurious vegetation in the area. However, it was later decided to be indecent and the name was changed to Ankeng (安坑; Ānkēng; An-kheⁿ; 'peaceful gorge').

== History ==
=== Empire of Japan ===
In 1920, during the period of Japanese rule, the area was established as Shinten Town (Japanese: 新店街), Bunsan District, Taihoku Prefecture.

=== Republic of China ===
The Kuomintang government moved the seat of government (in exile) of Fujian Province to Xindian from 1956 to 1996. Although in 1980, it was still underdeveloped, the four-lane Zhongxing Road helped to develop the city, While areas south of Xiaobitan were still farmland. After Freeway 3 opened, parks along Xiaobitan and Xindian Creek gave way to development. With the opening of the Taipei Metro, more commercial development and businesses have come into the area. In 2004 when the Tzu Chi Hospital branch opened, replacing a water park, a new road was constructed to deal with traffic.

Originally established as urban township of Taipei County, Xindian was upgraded to a county-administered city on 15 January 1980. After Taipei County was upgraded to New Taipei City on 25 December 2010, Xindian City became a district.

== Geography ==
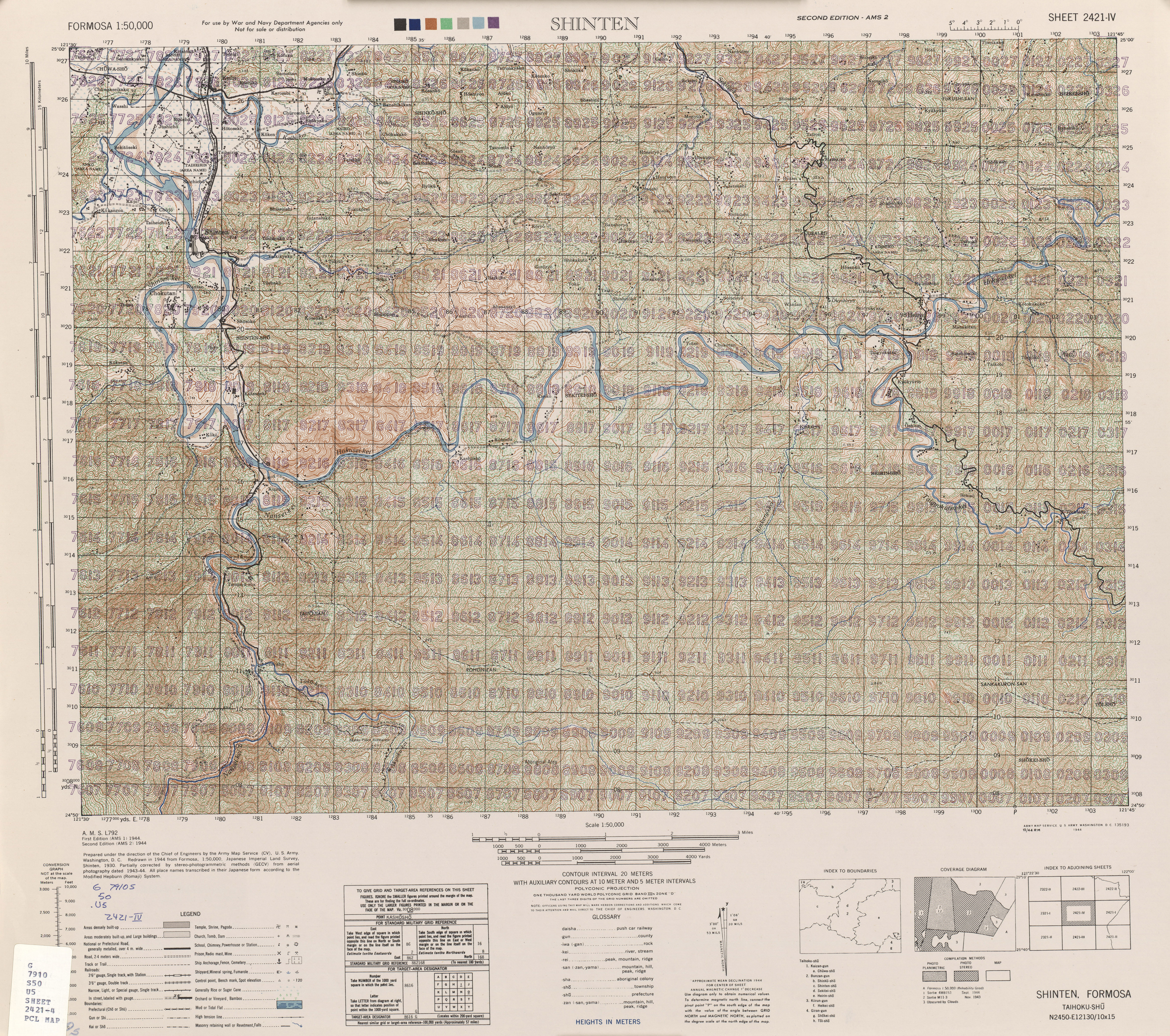
Map of Xindian (labeled as Shinten) and surrounding area (1944)

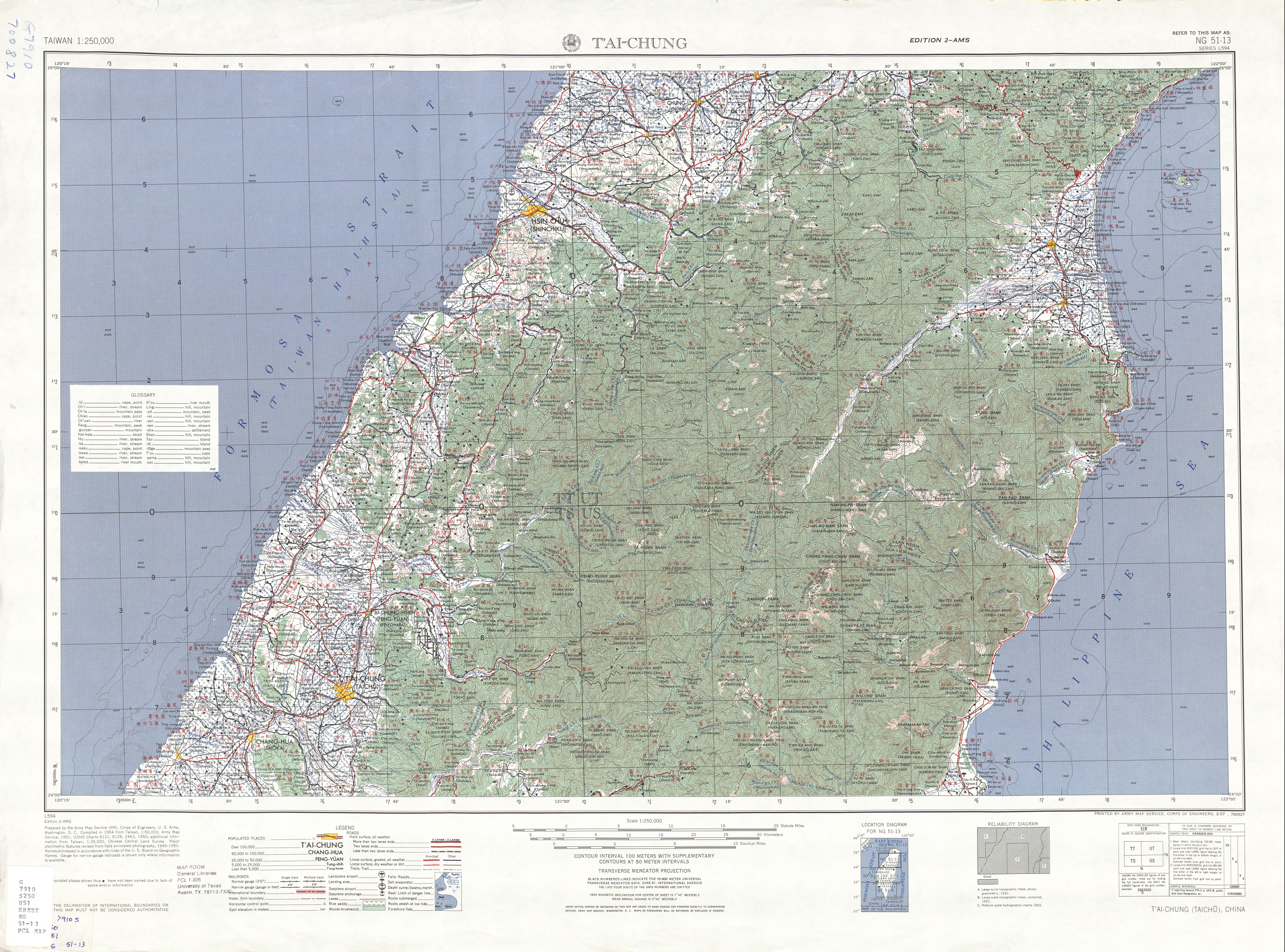
Map including Xindian (labeled as Hsin-tien (Shinten) 新店) (1954)

Xindian is located on the south side of the Taipei Basin, mainly on the plains between the Xindian Creek, its tributaries, and the mountains (the Xueshan Range). The Nanshi River merges with the Beishi River in Xindian, forming the Xindian Creek, one of the major tributaries of the Tamsui River. The Xindian Creek generally flows from south to north, dividing the city into east and west sides of the creek. Although the western side (Ankeng) covers a larger area, residential, administrative, commercial, and transportation centers are all on the eastern side of the creek at Dapinglin (大坪林). Most of the population in the Ankeng region is mainly concentrated in the southeastern hillside residential communities.

The district is located in southern New Taipei City. To the north is the Wenshan District of Taipei City and the Jingmei River, to the east it borders the district of Shiding, to the south it borders the district of Wulai, and to the west it borders the district of Sanxia. Compared to other districts in New Taipei City, Xindian is more influenced by Taipei City; the Taipei Metro extends into Xindian, via the Xindian Line and Xiaobitan Branch Line. Five Metro stations are located in Xindian: Xiaobitan; Dapinglin; Qizhang; Xindian District Office; and the main Xindian Metro station. Feitsui Dam is also located in the district.

Xindian has many traditional markets that have decades of history. The New Taipei City Police Department has ten divisions in Xindian.

== Administrative divisions ==
Xindian is divided into 69 villages (里), then further divided in 1,447 neighborhoods (鄰).

== Government agencies ==
- Architecture and Building Research Institute
- National Airborne Service Corps
- National Fire Agency
- National Science and Technology Center for Disaster Reduction
- Ministry of Justice Investigation Bureau
- Taiwan Transportation Safety Board

== Education ==
=== Universities ===
- Jinwen University of Science and Technology

=== Vocational schools ===
- Cardinal Tien College of Healthcare and Management
- Kaiming Senior Vocational School
- Nanqiang Senior Vocational School
- Zhuangjing Senior Vocational School
- Nengren Home Economics Vocational School

=== High schools ===
- New Taipei Municipal An Kang High School
- New Taipei Municipal Hsin Tien Senior High School
- Chi Jen Private High School (Private)
- Our Lady Of Providence Girls' High School (Private)
- Kang Chiao International School (Private)

=== Junior high schools ===
- Da Guan Junior High School
- An Kang High School
- Chi Jen Private High School (Private)
- Our Lady Of Providence Girls' High School (Private)
- Kang Chiao International School (Private)
- Wenshan Junior High School
- Wu Feng Junior High School

=== Elementary school ===
- Sindian Elementary School
- Jhihtan Elementary School
- Gueishan Elementary School
- Chung Cheng Elementary School
- Qing-Tan Elementary School
- Da-Feng Elementary School
- Quchi Elementary School
- Ankeng Elementary School
- Shuangcheng Elementary School
- Beihsin Elementary School
- Shuang Feng Elementary School
- Hsin He Elementary School
- Kang Chiao International School (Private)
- Da Guan Elementary School

== Tourist attractions ==
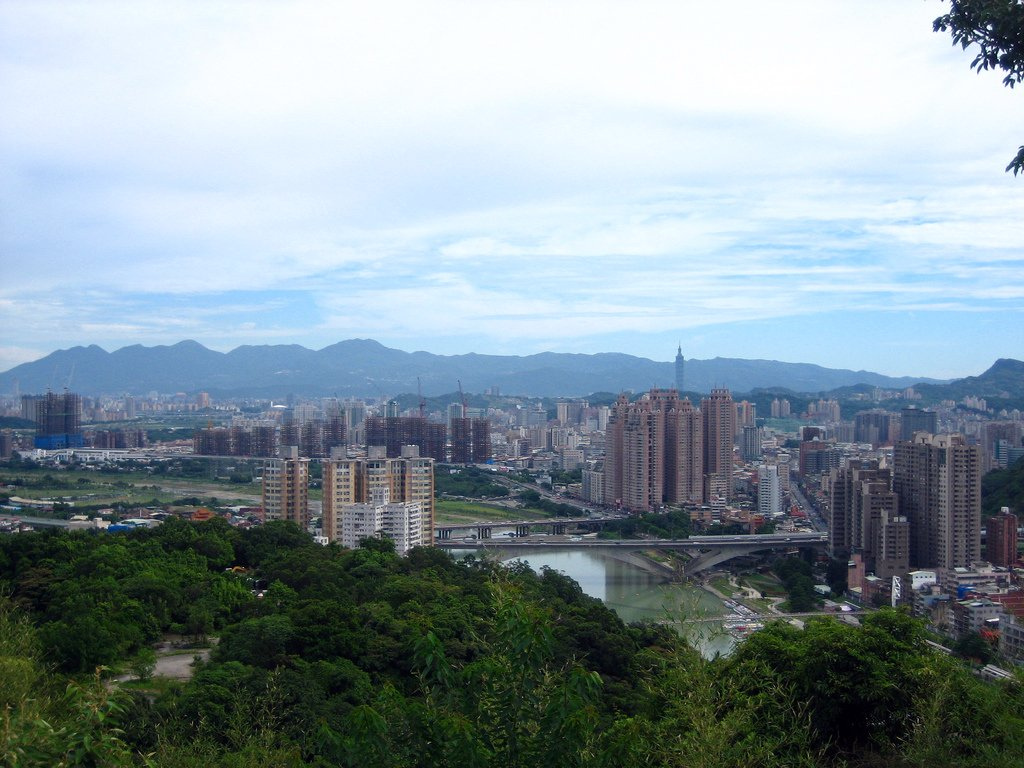
The Bitan Bridge in Xindian

- Bitan
- Bitan Bridge (碧潭橋)
- Xindian Ferry Pier
- Sunshine Sports Park (陽光運動公園)
- Xiaobitan Park (小碧潭公園)
- Qinqing Riverside Park (親情河濱公園)
- Liugong Park
- Yes!Life Mall (裕隆城)
- Xindian Old Street (新店老街)
- Jing-Mei White Terror Memorial Park
- Zhongyang villages (中央新村)
- Feicui Reservoir (翡翠水庫)
- Xindian River
- Erbazi Botanical Garden (二叭子植物園)
- Xindian History Museum (新店文史館)
- Lion's Head Mountain (獅頭山)
- Little Lion's Head Mountain (小獅頭山)
- Chen Feng-hsien Miniature Sculpture Museum (陳逢顯毫芒雕刻博物館)

== Transportation ==
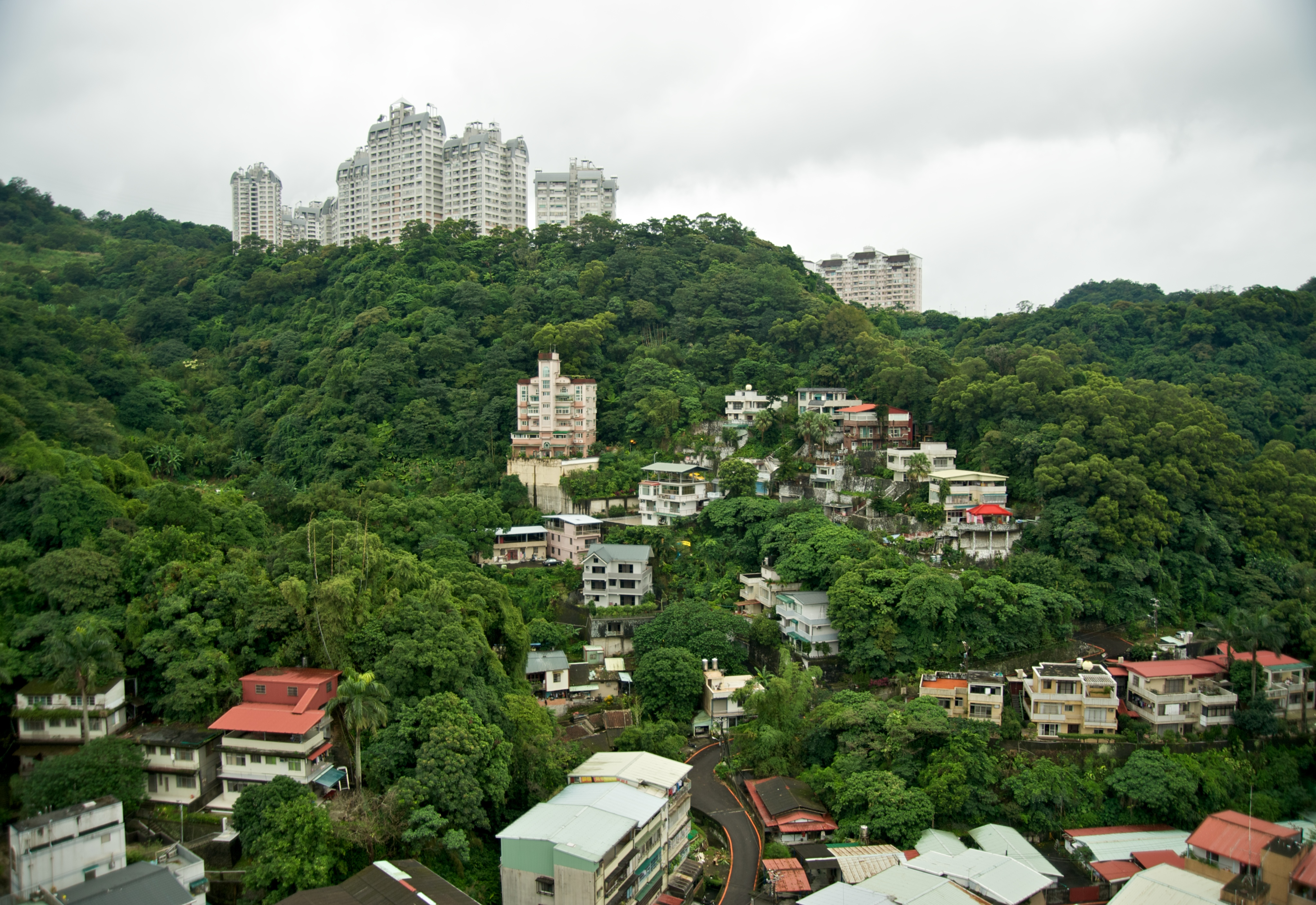
Residential buildings on a hillside

=== Taipei Metro ===
- Xindian metro station
- Xindian District Office metro station
- Qizhang metro station
- Shisizhang station
- Dapinglin metro station
- Xiaobitan metro station

=== Ankeng light rail ===
- Shuangcheng light rail station
- Rose China Town light rail station
- Taipei Xiaocheng light rail station
- Cardinal Tien Hospital Ankang Branch light rail station
- Jinwen University of Science and Technology light rail station
- Ankang light rail station
- Sunshine Sports Park light rail station
- Xinhe Elementary School light rail station
- Shisizhang station

National Highway No. 3 can also be reached via the district.

== Sister cities ==
- (United States) Tavares, Florida, US (2010)
- (United States) Flagstaff, Arizona, US
- Tongeren, Belgium

== Notable natives ==
- Serena Liu, former actress
- Shu Qi, actress
- Wang Yung-tsai, industrialist

== Galleries ==
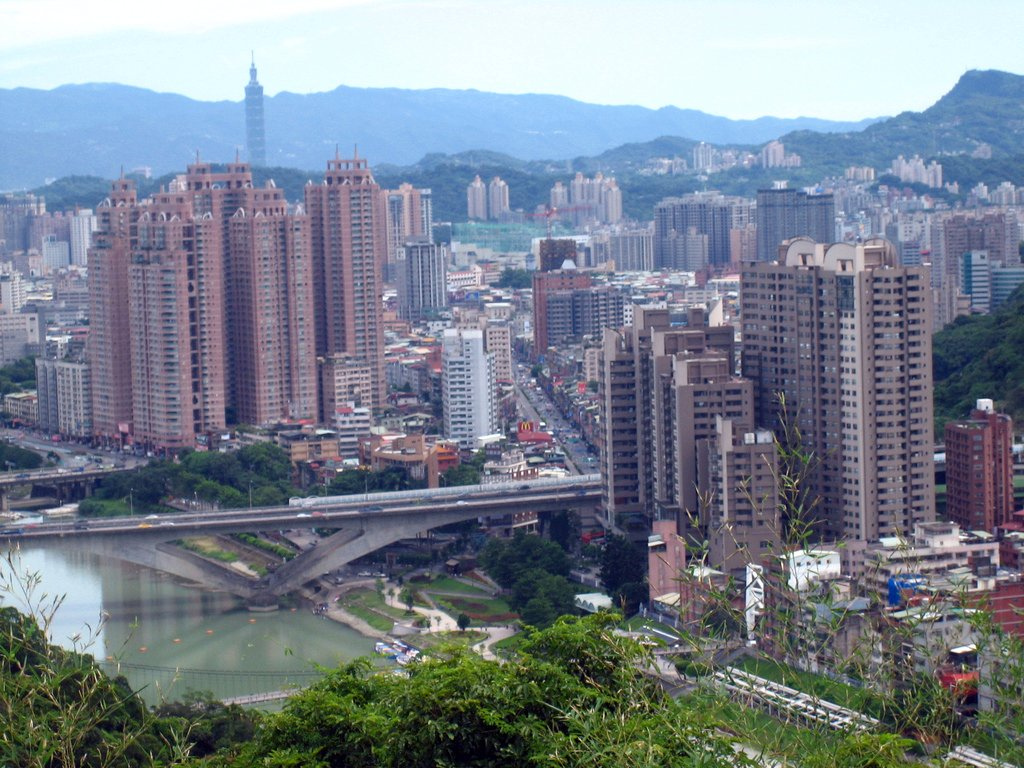
Xindian Skyline

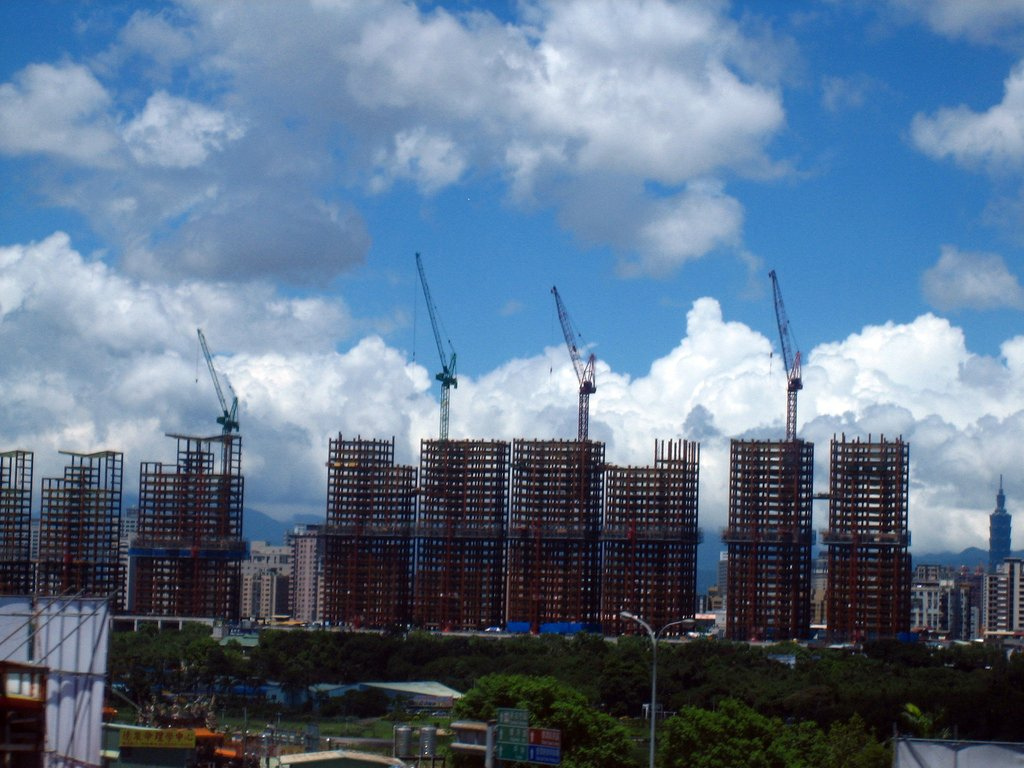
Construction of the Meiheshi complex in Xindian

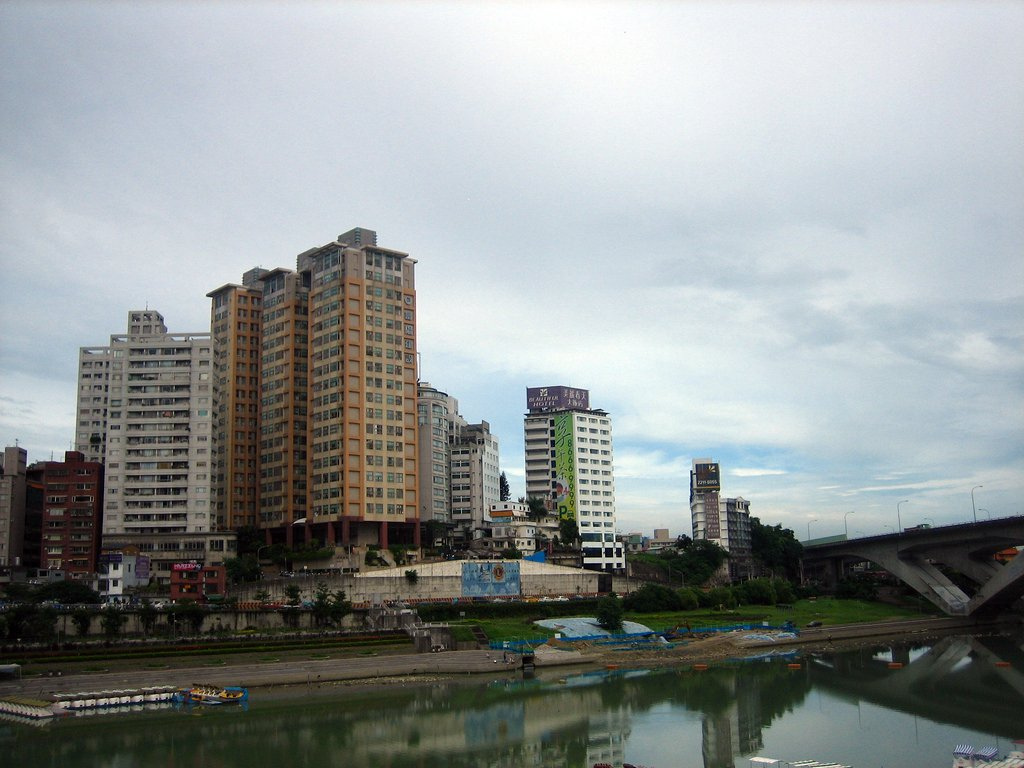
The Bitan

== See also ==
- New Taipei City
