= Shisizhang station =

Metro station in New Tapei, Taiwan

Shisizhang / K09 十四張
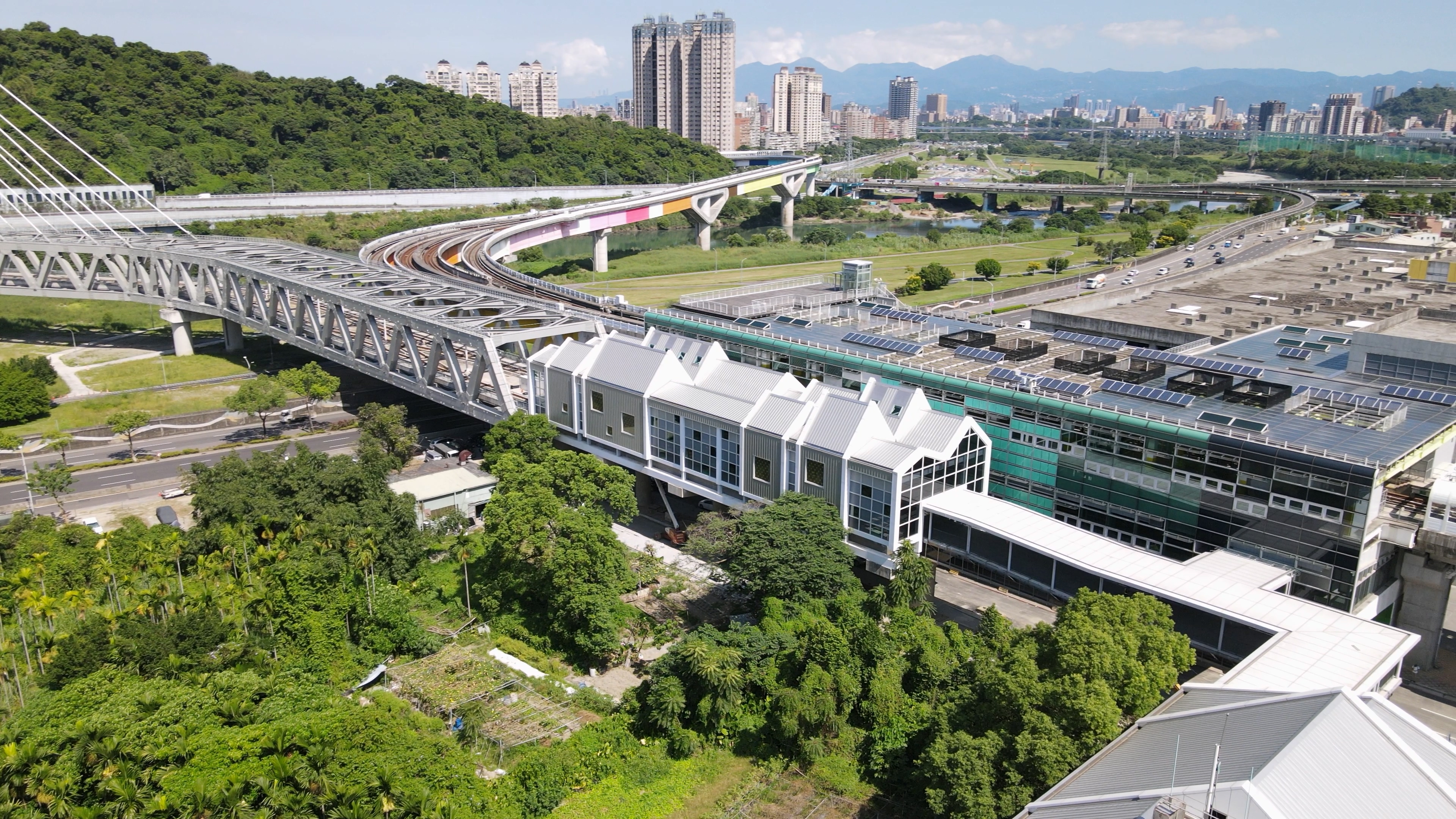

Chinese name
- Traditional Chinese: 十四張
- Simplified Chinese: 十四张
- Literal meaning: Fourteen Sheets
Transcriptions
Standard Mandarin
- Hanyu Pinyin: Shísìzhāng
- Bopomofo: ㄕˊㄙˋㄓㄤ
- Wade–Giles: Shih²-ssu⁴-chang¹
Hakka
- Pha̍k-fa-sṳ: Sṳ̍p-si-chông
Southern Min
- Hokkien POJ: Cha̍p-sì-tiuⁿ
- Tâi-lô: Tsa̍p-sì-tiunn

General information
- Location: Xindian, New Taipei; Taiwan
- Coordinates: 24.984339°N 121.527680°E
- Operator: Taipei Metro
- Lines: Circular line (Y08); Ankeng light rail (K09)
- Platforms: 4 (2 side platforms and 1 island platform)
- Tracks: 4
- Connections: Bus stop

Construction
- Structure type: Elevated
- Accessible: Yes

Other information
- Station code: / K09

History
- Opened: 31 January 2020; 6 years ago (Circular line); 10 February 2023; 3 years ago (Ankeng light rail)

Services
Preceding station	New Taipei Metro	Following station
Dapinglin Terminus	Circular line	Xiulang Bridge towards NT Industrial Park
Xinhe Elementary School towards Shuangcheng	Ankeng LRT	Terminus
Location

Shisizhang station (Chinese: 十四張站) is a station on the New Taipei Metro's Circular line. The station was opened on 31 January 2020. It is located in Xindian District, New Taipei City, Taiwan, near the banks of the Xindian River. A depot for the Circular line is located directly adjacent the station.

The opening ceremony of the Circular line was held at this station, which was visited by President Tsai Ing-wen, Taipei Mayor Ko Wen-je, New Taipei Mayor Hou Yu-Ih, and the Minister of Transportation and Communications Lin Chia-lung.

The station provides a transfer to the Ankeng light rail which opened on February 10, 2023.

== Station layout ==
3F
3F	Side platform, doors will open on the right
3F	Platform 1	← Circular line toward New Taipei Industrial Park (Y09 Xiulang Bridge)
3F	Platform 2	→ Circular line toward Dapinglin (Y07 Terminus) →
3F	Side platform, doors will open on the right

2F
2F	Concourse	Lobby, Information desk, automatic ticket machines, one-way faregates, restrooms (outside paid area)
2F	Connecting level	Connecting passageway
2F		← Ankeng light rail to Shuangcheng (K08 Xinhe Elementary School)
2F	Island platform
2F		← Ankeng light rail to Shuangcheng (K08 Xinhe Elementary School)

Street level
Street level	Ground level	Entrance/exit

== Exits ==
- Single exit: Minquan Rd.

== Around the station ==
- Shisizhang Temple
- National Human Rights Museum
