= Shuangcheng light rail station =

Light rail station in New Taipei, Taiwan

Shuangcheng K01 雙城站
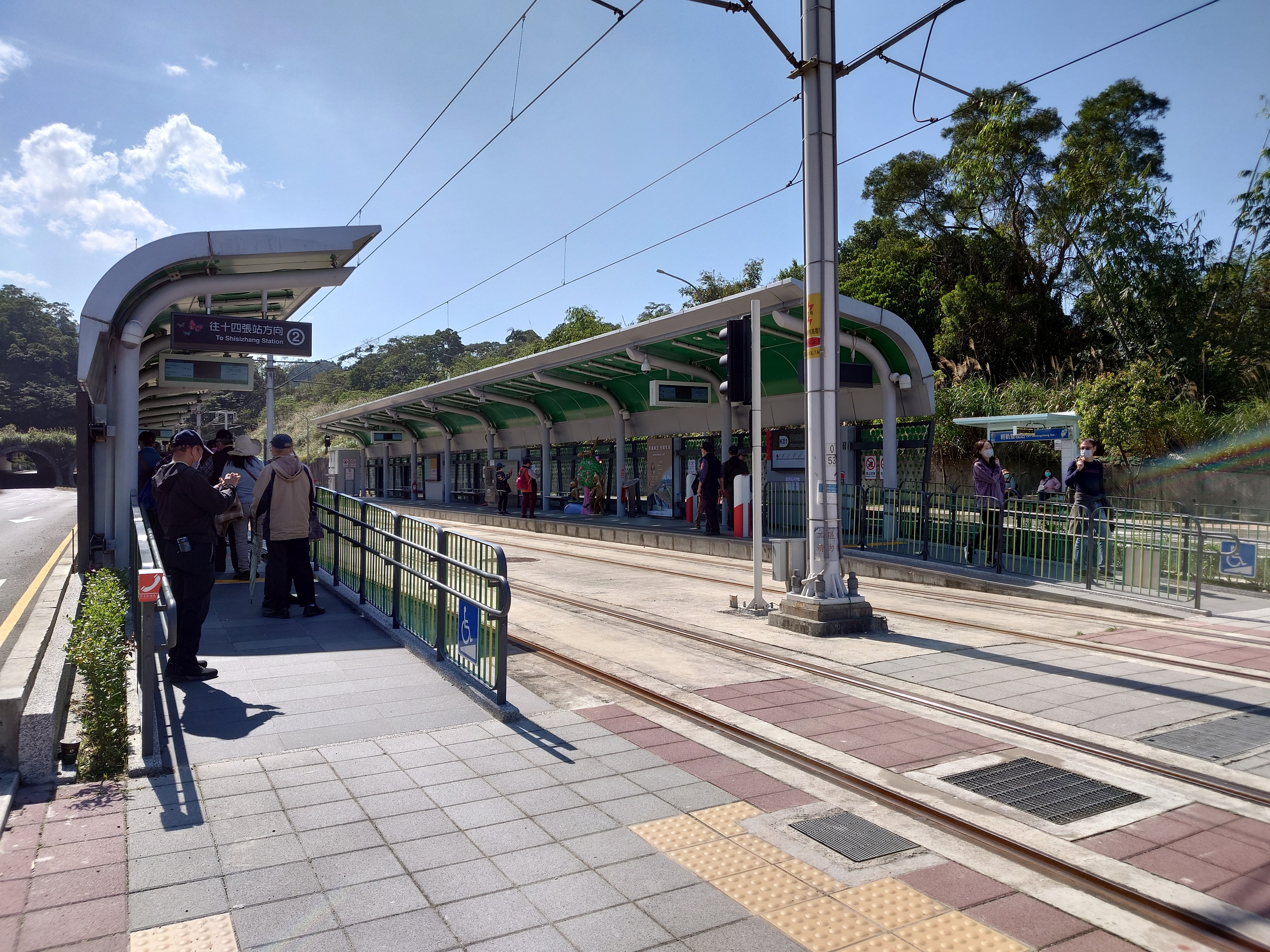

General information
- Location: Xindian, New Taipei; Taiwan
- Coordinates: 24.9464°N 121.4897°E
- Operated by: New Taipei Metro
- Platforms: 2 side platforms

Construction
- Structure type: At-grade
- Accessible: Yes

Other information
- Station code: K01

History
- Opened: February 10, 2023

Services
Preceding station	New Taipei Metro	Following station
Terminus	Ankeng LRT	Rose China Town towards Shisizhang
Location

Shuangcheng (Chinese: 雙城站; pinyin: Shuāngchéng zhàn) is a light rail station of the Ankeng light rail, operated by the New Taipei Metro, in Xindian, New Taipei, Taiwan.

== Station overview ==
This is an at-grade station with two side platforms. It is located on Section 3, Anyi Road.

== Station layout ==
Street level	Side platform, doors open on the right
Street level	Platform 1	← Ankeng light rail terminate platform (not carry passengers)
Street level	Platform 2	→ Ankeng light rail to Shisizhang (K02 Rose China Town) →
Street level	Side platform, doors open on the right
Street level	Entrance/exit

== Around the station ==
- Ankeng Depot

== History ==
Construction of the station started in 2014 and finished in 2022. It opened on February 10, 2023.

== See also ==
- Ankeng light rail
- New Taipei Metro
- Rail transport in Taiwan
