= Zhongyuan station =

Zhongyuan station may refer to the following stations:

- Zhongyuan metro station in New Taipei, Taiwan
- Zhongyuan railway station in Henan, China
