= Qiaohe =

Qiaohe may refer to:

- Qiaohe metro station
- Qiaohe Township (乔河乡), a township in Huachi County, Gansu province, China
