= Hitachi Rail Italy Driverless Metro =

Automated electric trainset

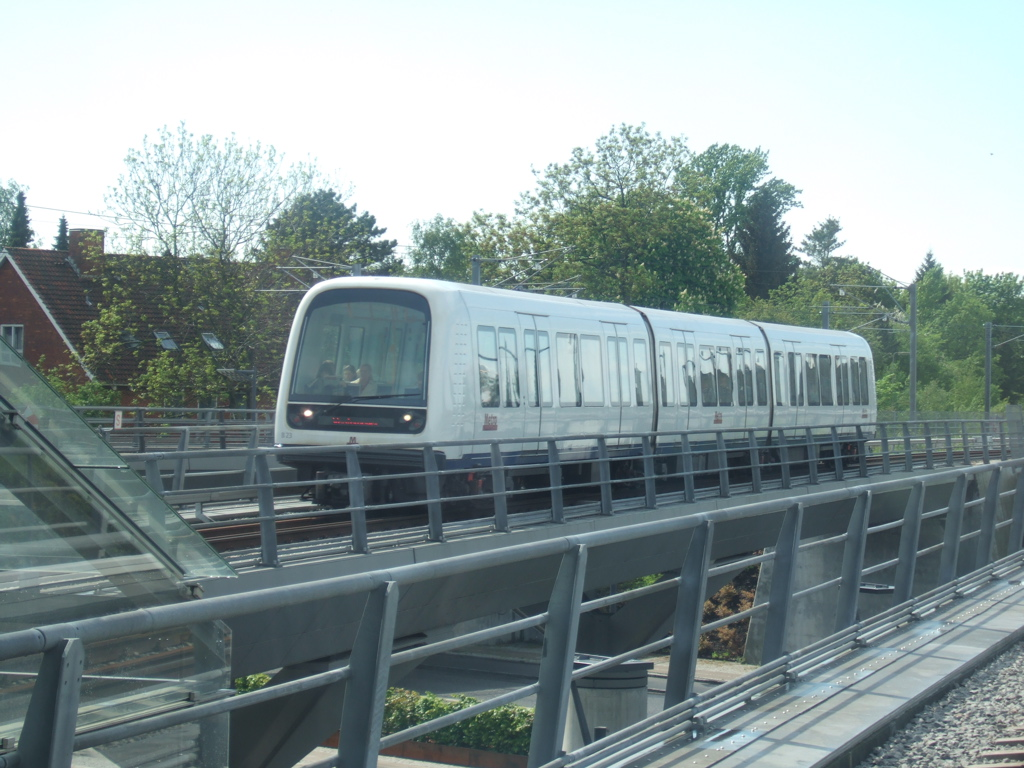
- A Copenhagen Metro train
- In service: 2002–present
- Manufacturer: Hitachi Rail Italy (formerly AnsaldoBreda)
- Constructed: 2001–present
- Number built: 255 (as of 2019)
- Formation: 2–6 cars

Specifications
- Width: 2.65 m (8 ft 8 in); 2.85 m (9 ft 4 in); 3.048 m (10 ft)
- Height: 3.4–3.85 m (11.2–12.6 ft)
- Maximum speed: 80–105 km/h (50–65 mph)
- Traction system: AnsaldoBreda/Hitachi Rail Italy IGBT-VVVF
- Electric systems: Third rail, 750 V DC; Overhead line, 1,500 V DC
- Current collection: Contact shoe (third rail); Pantograph (overhead line)
- Track gauge: 1,435 mm (4 ft 8 1/2 in) standard gauge

The Hitachi Rail Italy Driverless Metro is a class of driverless electric multiple units and corresponding signaling system. Manufactured by Hitachi Rail Italy (formerly AnsaldoBreda) and Hitachi Rail STS (former name Ansaldo STS) in Italy, it is or will be used on the Copenhagen Metro, a people mover at Princess Nourah Bint Abdul Rahman University, the Brescia Metro, the Thessaloniki Metro, lines 4 and 5 of the Milan Metro, Line C of the Rome Metro, Skyline in Honolulu, and the Circular line of the New Taipei Metro. The first system to use this class of driverless electric multiple units was the Copenhagen Metro which was opened in 2002.

The rolling stock consists of two to six articulated cars which operate on standard gauge. Each car has a power output of 210 or 256 kilowatts (282 or 343 hp), fed from a 750 V DC third rail (except in Rome where it is 1,500 V DC overhead line). The systems are fully automated, consisting of automatic train protection (ATP), automatic train operation (ATO) and automatic train supervision.

== Rolling stock ==
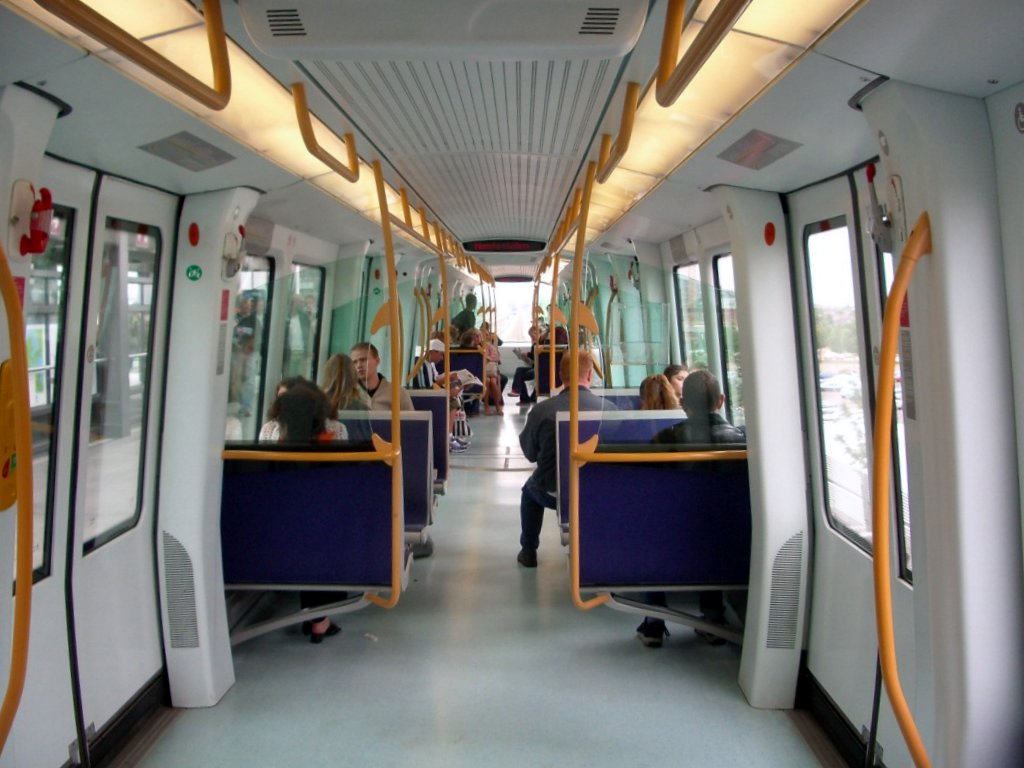
Interior of a Copenhagen Metro unit

The rolling stock uses standardized car bodies, articulated together. The number of cars varies across the different systems where they are used. The trains used on the Princess Nora bint Abdul Rahman University system are 2-car units. For the other systems, the units vary between three and six cars, making the trains from 39 to 109 m (127 ft 11 3/8 in to 357 ft 7 3/8 in) long. They are 2.65 m (8 ft 8 3/8 in) wide, except the Rome Metro units which are 2.85 meters (9 ft 4 1/4 in) wide, and the Honolulu Skyline units which are 10 ft (3,048 mm) wide to comply with Federal Railroad Administration regulations. The units vary from 3.4 to 3.85 m (11 ft 1 7/8 in to 12 ft 7 5/8 in) tall. Each car has two doors on each side, which are 1.3 m (4 ft 3 1/8 in) wide and 1.945 m (6 ft 4 5/8 in) tall. The vehicles are designed by Giugiaro Design.

The three and four-car trains have six three-phase asynchronous motors per train, with each motor giving a power output of 105 and 128 kW (141 and 172 hp), giving each train a power output of 630 or 764 kW (845 or 1,025 hp). In each car, the two motors are fed by the car's own insulated-gate bipolar transistor. The trains are powered by 750 V bottom contact third rail in most applications, although in Honolulu the same voltage is used but the third rail instead top contact, while Rome uses 1500 V overhead wires. The trains' top speeds are 80 to 105 km/h (50 to 65 mph), with an acceleration and deceleration capacity of 1.3 m/s/s (4.7 km/(h⋅s); 2.9 mph/s). Trains are fully compatible with platform screen doors, which are found at all stations in Brescia, Rome and Milan, Copenhagen, Honolulu, and Thessaloniki.

System	Classification	Line	Opening date	Trains	Cars	Length		Width		Power		Speed	
System	Classification	Line	Opening date	Trains	Cars	m	ft	m	ft	kW	hp	km/h	mph
Brescia	Series 100	—	2013	18	3	39	128	2.65	8.7	630	840	80	50
Copenhagen	A/B 01-34	M1 and M2	2002	34	3	39	128	2.65	8.7	630	840	90	56
Copenhagen		M3 and M4	2019	30	3	39	128	2.65	8.7	630	840	90	56
Honolulu		Skyline	2023	20	4	78.2	257	3.05	10.0	—	—	105	65
Milan	Series 4400	Line 4	2022	47	4	50.9	167	2.65	8.7	630	840	80	50
Milan	Series 5500	Line 5	2013	21	4	50.5	166	2.65	8.7	630	840	80	50
Rome	Series MC V00	Line C	2014	30	6	109.4	359	2.85	9.4	—	—	90	56
New Taipei	EMU101	Circular line	2020	17	4	68.43	224.5	2.65	8.7	1,632	2,189	80	50
New Taipei		Sanying line	2025	29	2	—	—	—	—	—	—	—	—
Thessaloniki		Line 1 and Line 2	2024	33	4	51	167	2.65	8.7	764	1,025	90	56

== Automation ==
The systems are controlled by a fully automated computer system, located at the control and maintenance center. The automatic train control (ATC) consists of three subsystems: automatic train protection (ATP), automatic train operation (ATO) and automatic train supervision (ATS). The ATP is responsible for managing the trains' speed, ensuring that doors are closed before departure and that switches are correctly set. The system uses fixed block signaling, except around stations, where moving block signaling is used. The system has been designed and built by Union Switch & Signal.

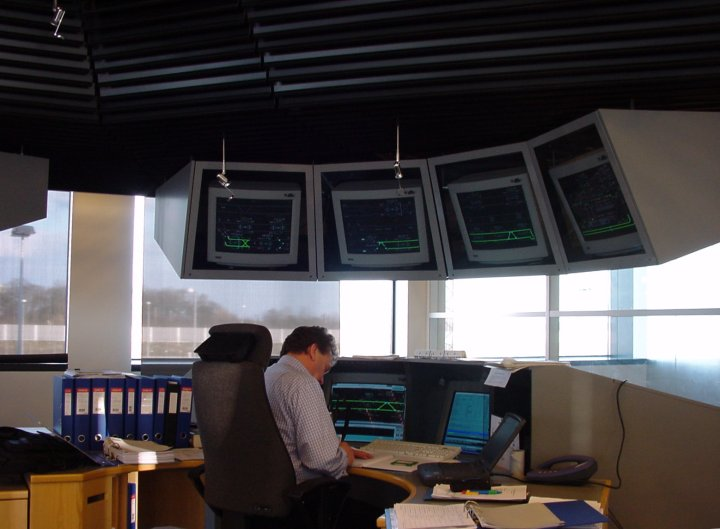
The control room of the Copenhagen Metro

The ATO is the autopilot that drives the trains in line with a pre-defined schedule, ensures that the train stop at stations and operates the doors. The ATS monitors all components of the network, including the rails and all trains on the system, and displays a live schematic at the control center. The ATC is designed so that only the ATP is safety-critical, and will halt trains if the other systems have faults. Other aspects of the system, such a power supply, ventilation, security alarms, cameras and pumps, are controlled by a system called "control, regulating and surveillance".

The most common repairs are the grinding of the wheels; more complicated repairs are made by replacing entire components that are sent to the manufacturer. By having components in reserve, trains can have shorter maintenance times. The center also has the system's work trains, including a diesel locomotive that can fetch broken trains. At any time, there are four people working at the control center. Two monitor the ATC system, one monitors passenger information, while the last is responsible for secondary systems, such as power supply. In case of technical problems, there is always a team of technicians who can be sent to perform repairs. Although the trains are not equipped with drivers, there can be stewards that help passengers, perform ticket controls and assist in emergency situations.

== Operators ==
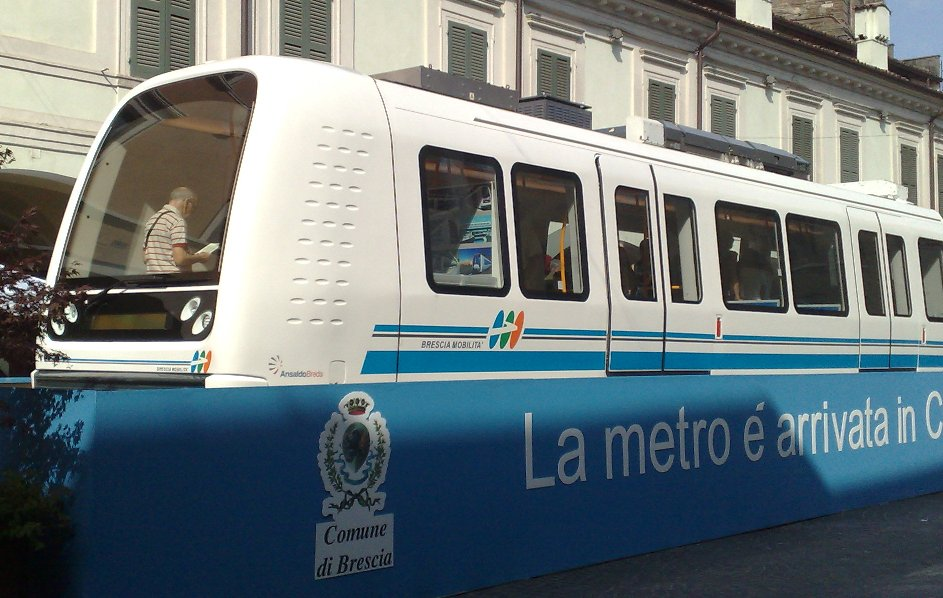
Brescia Metro unit

=== Brescia ===
The Brescia Metro is a system which opened in March 2013 in Brescia, Italy. The 18 km (11.2 mi) system was built in three stages and has 17 stations. The system features a 90-second headway. ASM Brescia ordered 18 trains which are now being used on the Metro.

=== Copenhagen ===
The Copenhagen Metro, Denmark, consists of four lines, M1, M2, M3 and M4 that run 38.2 kilometers (23.7 mi) serving 37 stations. The system opened in 2002 and was expanded in 2019 with further expansion being planned and evaluated. The first lines connects the city center to the areas of Frederiksberg and Amager, and Copenhagen Airport. The next extension, the City Circle Line opened on 29 September 2019. Metroselskabet took delivery of 34 three-car units between 2002 and 2007, and operates with a headway of between two and twenty minutes, including an all-night service. In April 2008, the Copenhagen Metro won the award at MetroRail 2008 for the world's best metro.

=== Honolulu ===
Skyline is a 16.1 mi (25.9 km) elevated rail line, planned to extend to 18.9 mi (30.4 km), which will connect the city of Honolulu on the island of Oʻahu in Hawaiʻi with outlying suburbs. The first section of the line opened on 30 June 2023, with the entire 19-station route to be completed by 2031.

=== Lima ===
The Line 2 of Lima Metro and a branch of Line 4, which will connect the city of east to west in the first case and the portion of line 4 linking the Jorge Chavez International Airport with the line 2, is currently under construction. The line will be built in two phases, the first of which is scheduled to open in 2017 and the second in 2020. The total of the 2 lines will cost US$5,346,000.

=== Milan ===
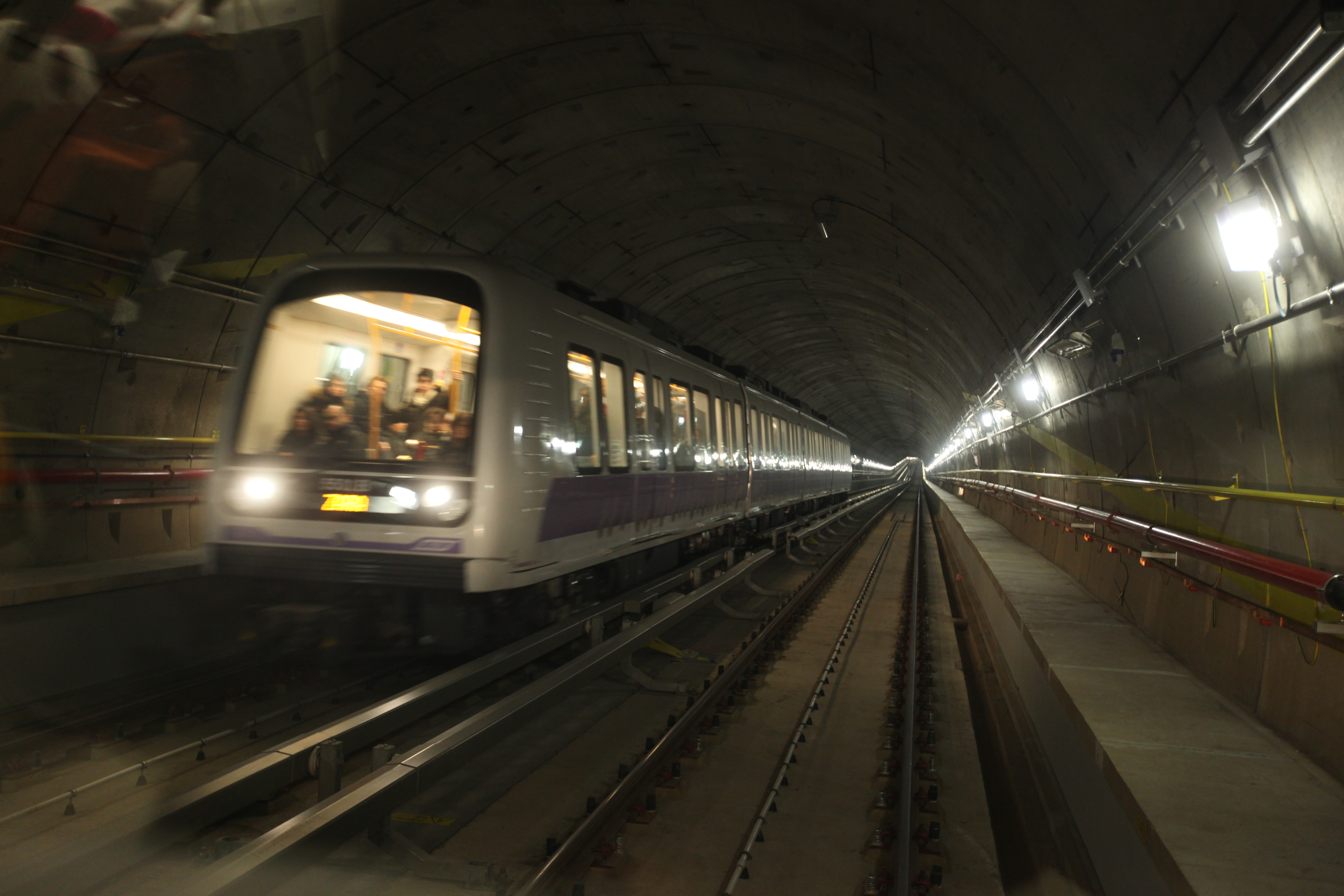
Milan Metro M5 Train

The Milan Metro's Line 5 first section between Bignami and the interconnection with M3 at Zara opened on 10 February 2013. The second stage opened on 1 March 2014, and runs from Zara to Porta Garibaldi station. The third opened in 2015, and runs from Garibaldi to San Siro stadium. The fourth section will run from Bignami to Monza, and it is planned to open by 2027. The first stage of 5.6 kilometres (3.5 mi) was estimated to cost €500 million.

Milan Metro's fourth line runs from Linate Airport to San Cristoforo. It is 15 km (9.3 mi) long with 21 stations. The first section, running from Linate to Dateo, opened on 26 November 2022, the full line was completed in 2024.

=== Riyadh ===
An 11·5 km metro serving the Princess Nora Bint Abdulrahman University on the outskirts of Riyadh opened in 2012.

=== Rome ===
Rome Metro's Line C is 25.5 km (15.8 mi) long, of which 17.6 km (10.9 mi) are underground. Metropolitana di Roma has ordered thirty six-car units, which are 20 centimeters (7.9 in) wider than the other systems' vehicles, and capable of carrying 1,200 passengers per train. Average speed on the system is 35 km/h (21.7 mph), with the headway varying from three to twelve minutes.

=== Taipei ===
The Yellow line or the Circular line of the New Taipei Metro, Taiwan, will serve as a cross-link between existing lines. The 49 km (30.4 mi) system will feature 42 or 41 stations. The 15.4 km (9.6 mi) phase 1 has 14 stations and was completed in January 2020. The Taipei Rapid Transit Corporation purchased 17 trainsets for this phase.

=== Thessaloniki ===
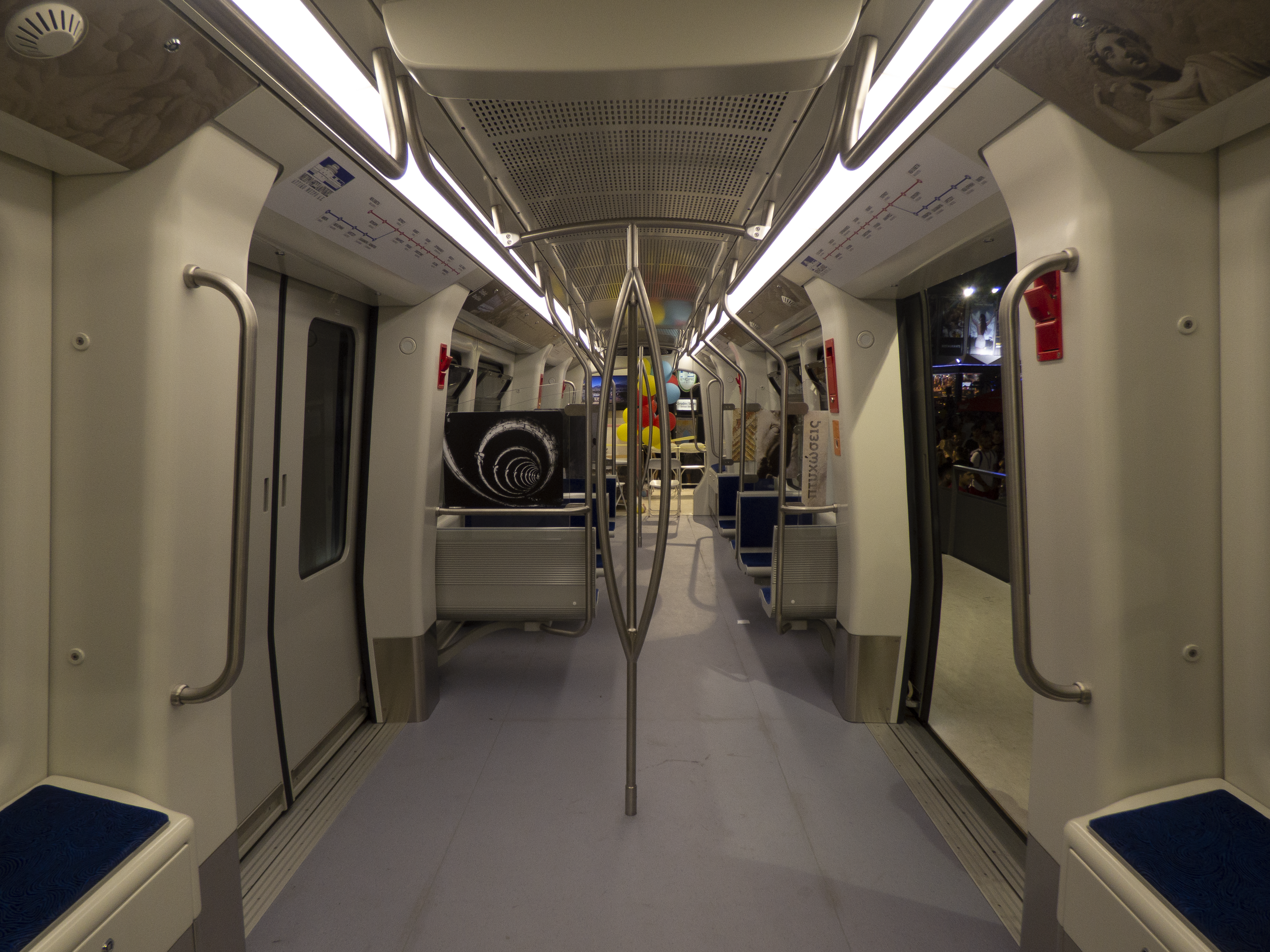
Interior of a Thessaloniki Metro unit.

The construction of the second Greek metro network started in 2006 and was opened in November 2024. The line and a planned extension to the east of the city cost three billion euros ($3.2 billion). The 14.28 km (8.87 mi) system features 18 stations. 33 driverless Hitachi Rail Italy (AnsaldoBreda) units are currently operating on Line 1 and Line 2. Those are articulated in 4 sections with a capacity of 466 passengers (96 seated and 370 standing).
