= Banxin metro station =

Metro station in New Tapei, Taiwan

Banxin 板新
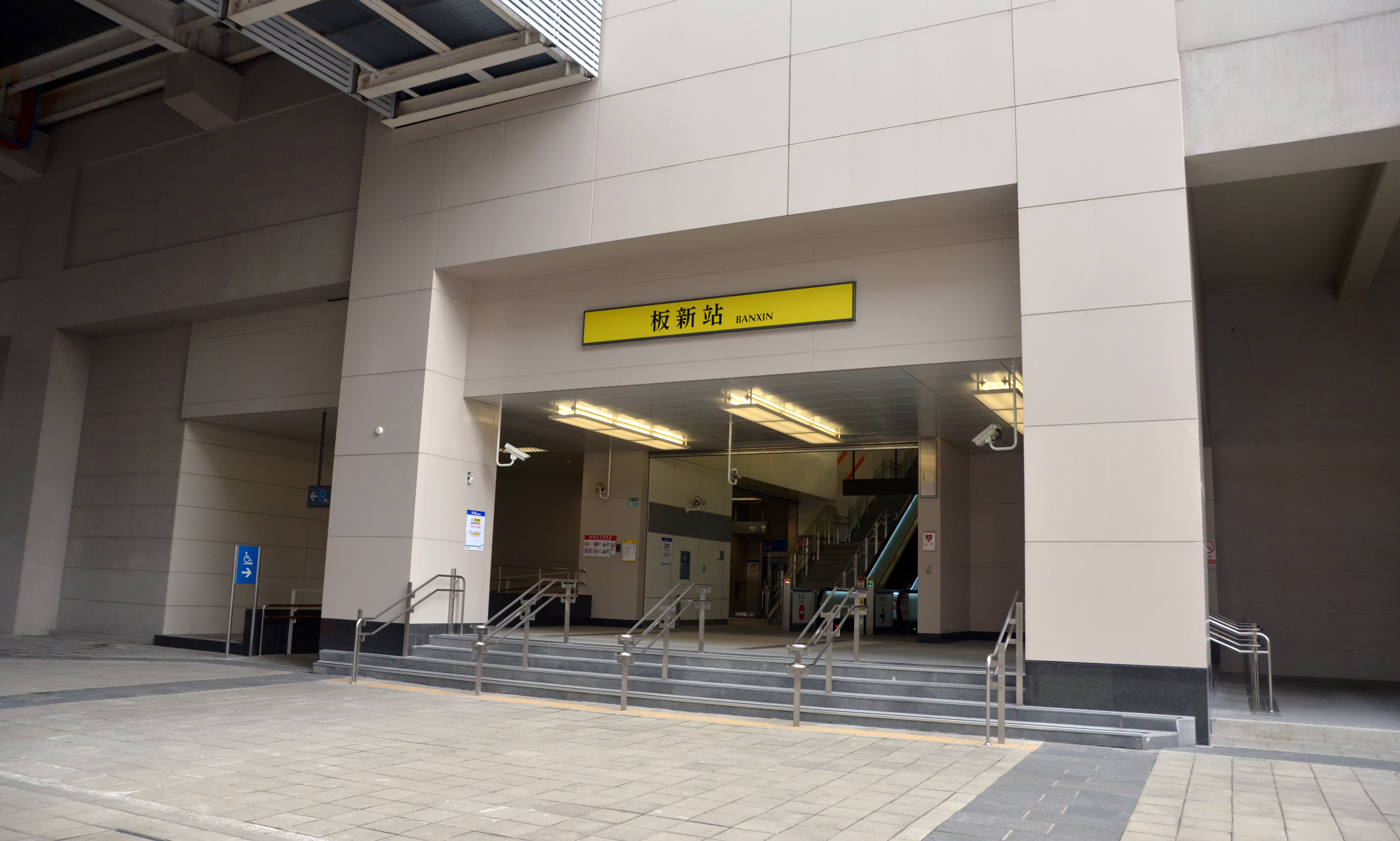
- Station entrance

Chinese name
- Chinese: 板新
Transcriptions
Standard Mandarin
- Hanyu Pinyin: Bǎnxīn
- Bopomofo: ㄅㄢˇ ㄒㄧㄣ
- Wade–Giles: Pan³-hsin¹
Hakka
- Pha̍k-fa-sṳ: Piông-sîn
Southern Min
- Tâi-lô: Pán-sin

General information
- Location: Banqiao, New Taipei; Taiwan
- Coordinates: 25.0145°N 121.4725°E
- Operated by: New Taipei Metro
- Line: Circular line (Y15)
- Connections: Bus stop

Construction
- Structure type: Elevated

Other information
- Station code: Y15

History
- Opened: 31 January 2020

Services
Preceding station	New Taipei Metro	Following station
Zhongyuan towards Dapinglin	Circular line	Banqiao towards NT Industrial Park
Location

Banxin station is a station on the New Taipei Metro's Circular line. It opened on 31 January 2020. It is located in Banqiao District, New Taipei, Taiwan.

== Station layout ==
4F	Connecting level	Platforms-connecting overpass
3F	Side platform, doors will open on the right
3F	Platform 1	← Circular line toward New Taipei Industrial Park (Y16 Banqiao)
3F	Platform 2	→ Circular line toward Dapinglin (Y14 Zhongyuan) →
3F	Side platform, doors will open on the right
3F	Concourse	Lobby, information desk, automatic ticket machines, shops, restrooms (outside paid area)

Street level	Ground level	Entrance/exit

== Around the station ==
- Banqiao First Stadium (850m southwest of the station)
- Minsheng Park (500m southeast of the station)
- Bu Qian Market (650m east of the station)
