= Circular Line (Taipei metropolitan area) =

Metro line in New Taipei City

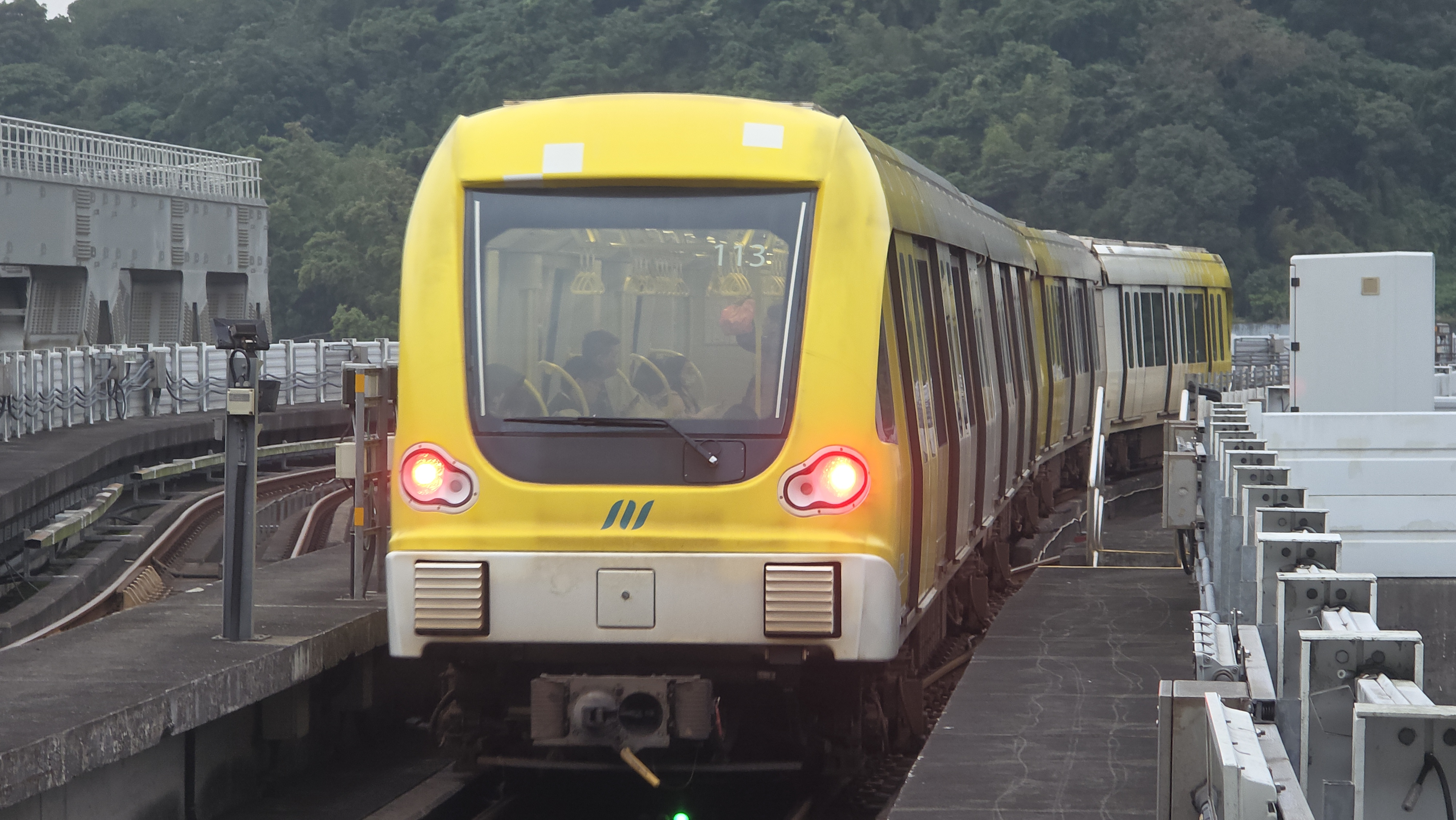
- A C610 train leaving Shisizhang, on January 7, 2026

Overview
- Other name: Yellow Line
- Native name: 環狀線
- Status: Phase 1: In service; South, North, East sections: Under construction
- Owner: Taipei DORTS; New Taipei DORTS
- Line number: Y
- Locale: Taipei and New Taipei, Taiwan
- Termini: Dapinglin; New Taipei Industrial Park
- Stations: 14 (Western section)
- Color on map: Yellow

Service
- Type: Light metro
- System: Taipei Metro
- Operator: New Taipei Metro Corporation (Note: The first section of the Circular Line was operated by Taipei Rapid Transit Corporation from the opening date to May 22, 2023. On May 23, 2023, the operator for this line was changed to New Taipei Metro Corporation. However, the discussion for Circular Line operator will take place again when the construction for South and North sections of this line is completed, in one year.)
- Depots: North; South
- Rolling stock: C610; Alstom Metropolis (type TBA (built in Taubaté))

History
- Planned opening: South and North sections: June 2031; East section: September 2032
- Opened: 31 January 2020; 6 years ago

Technical
- Line length: 15.4 km (9.6 mi)
- Num of tracks: 2
- Character: Elevated and underground
- Track gauge: 1,435 mm (4 ft 8 1/2 in) standard gauge
- Electrification: 750 V DC third rail
- Operating speed: 70 km/h (43 mph) to 80 km/h (50 mph)

Circular Line
- Traditional Chinese: 環狀線
- Simplified Chinese: 环状线
Transcriptions
Standard Mandarin
- Hanyu Pinyin: Huánzhuàng Xiàn
- Wade–Giles: Huan^{2}-chuang^{4} Hsien^{4}
- Tongyong Pinyin: Huánjhuàng-Siàn
Southern Min
- Hokkien POJ: Khoân-chōng Sòaⁿ

Yellow Line
- Traditional Chinese: 黃線
- Simplified Chinese: 黄线
Transcriptions
Standard Mandarin
- Hanyu Pinyin: Huáng Xiàn
- Wade–Giles: Huang Hsien^{4}
- Tongyong Pinyin: Huáng-Siàn
Southern Min
- Hokkien POJ: N̂g Sòaⁿ

The Circular Line (Chinese: 環狀線), also known as Yellow Line (Chinese: 黃線), is a medium-capacity rapid transit line on the Taipei Metro. The first section of this line is operated by New Taipei Metro Corporation and it runs between Dapinglin and New Taipei Industrial Park in the Taipei metropolitan area. It is approximately 15.4 km (9.6 mi) long with 14 stations. The initial western section was opened on 31 January 2020. Hitachi Rail Italy supplied 17 sets of 4-car driverless medium-capacity trains for the line. Extensions are currently underway to form a full loop.

== Construction ==
Hitachi Rail STS supplied electromechanical equipment for the line, including driverless technology and CBTC signaling. Dapinglin, currently the only underground station on the line, was constructed by RSEA Engineering Corporation and employed the cut-and-cover method.

Construction for the first phase officially broke ground on 11 July 2011 on a 6.3 km (3.9 mi) elevated section between Zhonghe and Banqiao. The section is estimated to cost NT$13.7 billion, with the entire first-stage 15.4 km (9.6 mi) route estimated to cost NT$54.7 billion to construct.

The line includes the first elevated split platforms in the system at Zhonghe, Qiaohe, and Zhongyuan due to the narrowness of the available station area.

The initial section between Dapinglin and New Taipei Industrial Park opened on 31 January 2020. On 5 May 2023, the Circular Line was transferred from the Taipei Metro to the New Taipei Metro, with the fare structure still integrated with the Taipei Metro system, unlike light rail lines of the New Taipei Metro.

== Public art ==
Unlike previous public art installations on the metro, it was decided that a smaller number of art pieces would be installed within the same budget, allowing for large-scale artwork.

Across the above ground section of the line, Emmanuelle Moureaux (a Tokyo based French architect and designer) spread distinctive bold colours across infrastructure – including steel beams and pillars, noise barriers, 13 stations and platforms, a bridge over the Tamsui River, and the exterior and interior design of the train.

The platforms, walls and ceilings of Banqiao station are decorated by French artist Daniel Buren, using regular, contrasting coloured stripes.

== Stations ==
The western section of the line officially opened on 31 January 2020. Services between Zhonghe and Banqiao were temporarily suspended from 3 April 2024 onwards due to the 2024 Hualien earthquake, with the repair work expected to take one year to complete. The section reopened ahead of schedule on 12 December 2024 at 12:00 PM Taiwan Standard Time.

Code (Note: Italic for constructing or planning stations)	Station name	Station type		Locale		Sta. distance (km)		Opened date	Transfer
Code	Station name	Structure	Platform	Locale		Previous	Total	Opened date	Transfer
Circular Line
Continue with Y39 station
Y1	Taipei Zoo 動物園	Underground	Island	Wenshan	Taipei	3.240	49.079 0.000	Est. 2031-6	Wenhu Line; Shenkeng LRT; Maokong Gondola
Y2	Unreleased	Underground	Island	Wenshan	Taipei	1.139	1.139	Est. 2031-6	—N/a
Y3	Unreleased	Underground	Island	Wenshan	Taipei	1.061	2.200	Est. 2031-6	—N/a
Y4	Unreleased	Underground	Island	Wenshan	Taipei	1.170	3.370	Est. 2031-6	—N/a
Y5	Unreleased	Underground	Island	Wenshan	Taipei	0.989	4.359	Est. 2031-6	—N/a
Y6	Unreleased	Underground	Island	Xindian	New Taipei	0.586	4.945	Est. 2031-6	—N/a
Y07	Dapinglin 大坪林	Underground	Island	Xindian	New Taipei	0.721	5.666	2020-1-31	Songshan–Xindian Line
Y08	Shisizhang 十四張	Elevated	Side	Xindian	New Taipei	1.559	7.225	2020-1-31	Ankeng LRT
Y09	Xiulang Bridge 秀朗橋	Elevated	Side	Zhonghe	New Taipei	1.116	8.341	2020-1-31	—N/a
Y10	Jingping 景平	Elevated	Side	Zhonghe	New Taipei	0.849	9.190	2020-1-31	—N/a
Y11	Jingan 景安	Elevated	Side	Zhonghe	New Taipei	1.157	10.347	2020-1-31	Zhonghe–Xinlu Line
Y12	Zhonghe 中和	Elevated	Split	Zhonghe	New Taipei	1.440	11.787	2020-1-31	Wanda–Shulin Line
Y13	Qiaohe 橋和	Elevated	Split	Zhonghe	New Taipei	0.635	12.422	2020-1-31	—N/a
Y14	Zhongyuan 中原	Elevated	Split	Zhonghe	New Taipei	0.732	13.154	2020-1-31	—N/a
Y15	Banxin 板新	Elevated	Side	Banqiao	New Taipei	1.392	14.546	2020-1-31	—N/a
Y16	Banqiao 板橋	Elevated	Side	Banqiao	New Taipei	0.952	15.498	2020-1-31	Bannan Line; Western Trunk line Taiwan High Speed Rail
Y17	Xinpu Minsheng 新埔民生	Elevated	Side	Banqiao	New Taipei	1.423	16.921	2020-1-31	Bannan Line (BL08)
Y18	Touqianzhuang 頭前庄	Elevated	Side	Xinzhuang	New Taipei	1.800	18.721	2020-1-31	Zhonghe–Xinlu Line
Y19	Xingfu 幸福	Elevated	Side	Xinzhuang	New Taipei	0.624	19.345	2020-1-31	—N/a
Y20	New Taipei Industrial Park 新北產業園區	Elevated	Side	Xinzhuang	New Taipei	1.560	20.905	2020-1-31	Taoyuan Airport MRT
Y21	Unreleased	Underground	Island	Wugu	New Taipei	0.900	21.805	Est. 2031-6	—N/a
Y22	Unreleased	Underground	Island	Wugu	New Taipei	1.369	23.174	Est. 2031-6	—N/a
Y23	Unreleased	Underground	Split	Luzhou	New Taipei	0.977	24.151	Est. 2031-6	—N/a
Y24	St. Ignatius High School 徐匯中學	Underground	Side	Luzhou	New Taipei	1.280	25.431	Est. 2031-6	Zhonghe–Xinlu Line
Y25	Unreleased	Underground	Island	Luzhou	New Taipei	1.139	26.570	Est. 2031-6	Wugu-Taishan LRT
Y26	Unreleased	Underground	Island	Sanchong	New Taipei	0.786	27.356	Est. 2031-6	—N/a
Y27	Unreleased	Underground	Split	Shilin	Taipei	1.869	29.225	Est. 2031-6	—N/a
Y28	Unreleased	Underground	Island	Shilin	Taipei	1.085	30.310	Est. 2031-6	—N/a
Y29	Shilin 士林	Underground	Island	Shilin	Taipei	0.675	30.985	Est. 2031-6	Tamsui–Xinyi Line
Y30	Unreleased	Underground	Island	Shilin	Taipei	0.537	31.522	Est. 2031-6	—N/a
Y31	Unreleased	Underground	Island	Shilin	Taipei	1.780	33.302	Est. 2031-6	—N/a
Y32	Jiannan Road 劍南路	Underground	Split	Zhongshan	Taipei	1.984	35.286	Est. 2031-6	Wenhu Line
Y33	Unreleased	Underground	Island	Zhongshan	Taipei	0.928	36.214	Est. 2032-9	—N/a
Y34	Unreleased	Underground	Island	Neihu	Taipei	0.985	37.199	Est. 2032-9	—N/a
Y35	Unreleased	Underground	Island	Neihu	Taipei	0.535	37.734	Est. 2032-9	—N/a
Y36	Unreleased	Underground	Island	Neihu	Taipei	0.875	38.609	Est. 2032-9	—N/a
Y37	Unreleased	Underground	Island	Neihu	Taipei	1.025	39.634	Est. 2032-9	—N/a
Y38	Unreleased	Underground	Island	Neihu	Taipei	0.905	40.539	Est. 2032-9	Minsheng–Xizhi line
Y39	Songshan 松山	Underground	Island	Songshan	Taipei	1.685	42.224	Est. 2032-9	Songshan–Xindian Line; Western Trunk line
Y40	Yongchun 永春	Underground	Island	Xinyi	Taipei	0.825	43.049	Est. 2032-9	Bannan Line
Y41	Xiangshan 象山	Underground	Island	Xinyi	Taipei	1.790	44.839	Est. 2032-9	Tamsui–Xinyi Line
Y42	Unreleased	Underground	Split	Xinyi	Taipei	1.000	45.839	Est. 2032-9	—N/a
Continue with Taipei Zoo station

== See also ==
- Rail transport in Taiwan
