= New Taipei Metro C610 =

Rolling stock of Taipei Metro

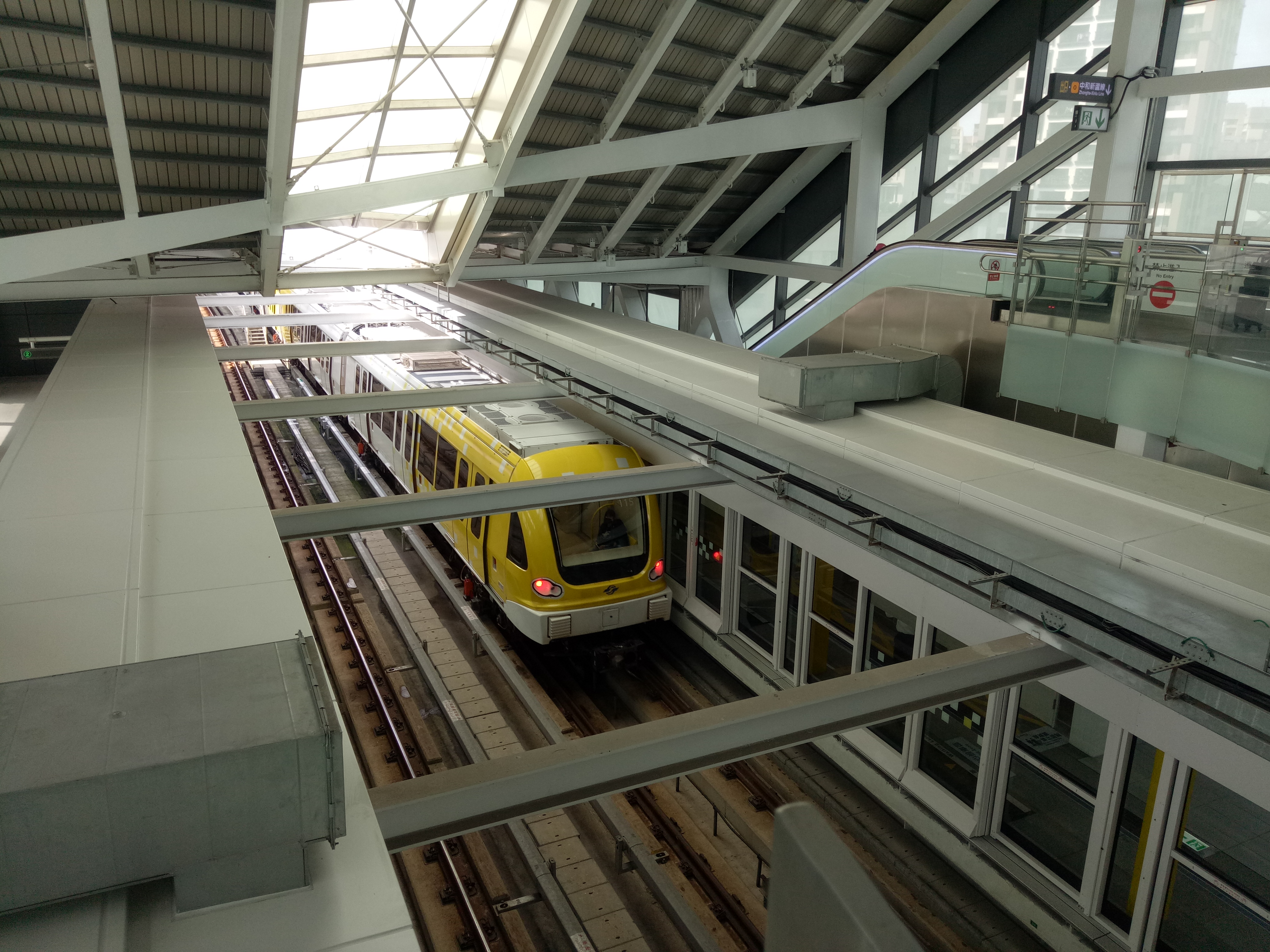
- A Circular line train at Jingan station

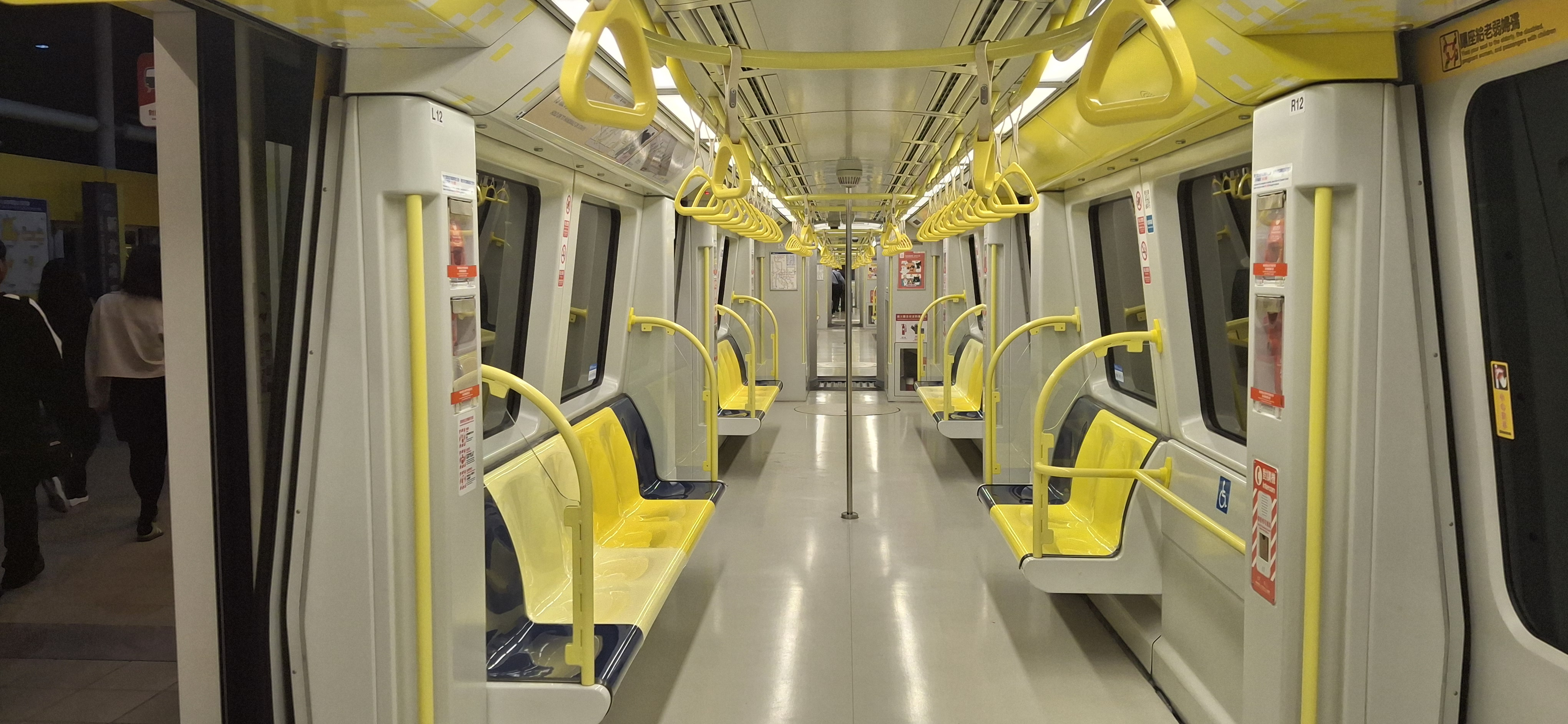
- train interior
- In service: 2020–present
- Manufacturers: Hitachi Rail Italy and Taiwan Rolling Stock Company
- Assembly: Hsinchu
- Built at: Reggio Calabria, Italy
- Family name: Driverless Metro
- Constructed: 2016–2018
- Entered service: 31 January 2020
- Number built: 68 vehicles (17 sets)
- Number in service: 68 vehicles (17 sets)
- Formation: 4-car sets (A–C–D–B)
- Fleet numbers: 101–117
- Capacity: 650
- Operator: New Taipei Metro Corporation
- Depots: North, South
- Line served: Circular line

Specifications
- Car body construction: Aluminium
- Train length: 68.43 m (224 ft 6 in)
- Car length: 17,455 mm (57 ft 3.2 in) (A/B); 16.76 m (55 ft 0 in) (C/D)
- Width: 2.65 m (8 ft 8 in)
- Height: 3.6 m (11 ft 10 in)
- Doors: 2 × 3 per car
- Wheel diameter: 710–660 mm (28–26 in) (new–worn)
- Wheelbase: 2 m (6 ft 7 in)
- Maximum speed: 90 km/h (56 mph) (design); 80 km/h (50 mph) (service)
- Weight: 117 t (115 long tons; 129 short tons)
- Traction system: Hitachi Rail Italy IGBT–VVVF
- Traction motors: 16 × Hitachi Rail Italy MTA-A4-85V 102 kW (137 hp) 3-phase AC induction motor
- Power output: 1,632 kW (2,189 hp)
- Acceleration: 1.2 m/s^{2} (3.9 ft/s^{2})
- Deceleration: 1 m/s^{2} (3.3 ft/s^{2}) (service); 1.3 m/s^{2} (4.3 ft/s^{2}) (emergency)
- Electric systems: 750 V DC third rail
- Current collection: Contact shoe
- UIC classification: Bo′Bo′+Bo′Bo′+Bo′Bo′+Bo′Bo′
- Braking system: Regenerative
- Safety systems: Moving block CBTC ATC under ATO GoA 4 (UTO), with subsystems of ATP, ATS and CBI: Original: Hitachi Rail STS; Future upgrade: Alstom Urbalis 400
- Coupling system: Scharfenberg
- Track gauge: 1,435 mm (4 ft 8 1/2 in) standard gauge

The New Taipei Metro C610 is a medium-capacity train operating on New Taipei Metro's Circular line. A total of 17 4-car trains were manufactured by Hitachi Rail Italy (formerly AnsaldoBreda) in Reggio Calabria, then shipped to Hsinchu for final assembly at Taiwan Rolling Stock Company (TRSC). This is the second time Taiwan has purchased trains made in Italy after Taiwan Railways' EMU300 series, built by Socimi.

This was Taipei Metro's third medium-capacity train and New Taipei Metro's first, and officially entered service with the opening of the first phase of the Circular line on 31 January 2020.

== History ==
In 2009, the Taipei City Government held a tender for the first phase of the construction of the Circular line, and the bid was awarded to AnsaldoBreda (now Hitachi Rail Italy) for designing and manufacturing the Driverless Metro trains. In August 2016, the AnsaldoBreda factory in Reggio Calabria held a delivery ceremony. In November, it arrived at South Depot for various tests and subsequent integration operations, and dynamic testing started in mid-2017.

== Design ==
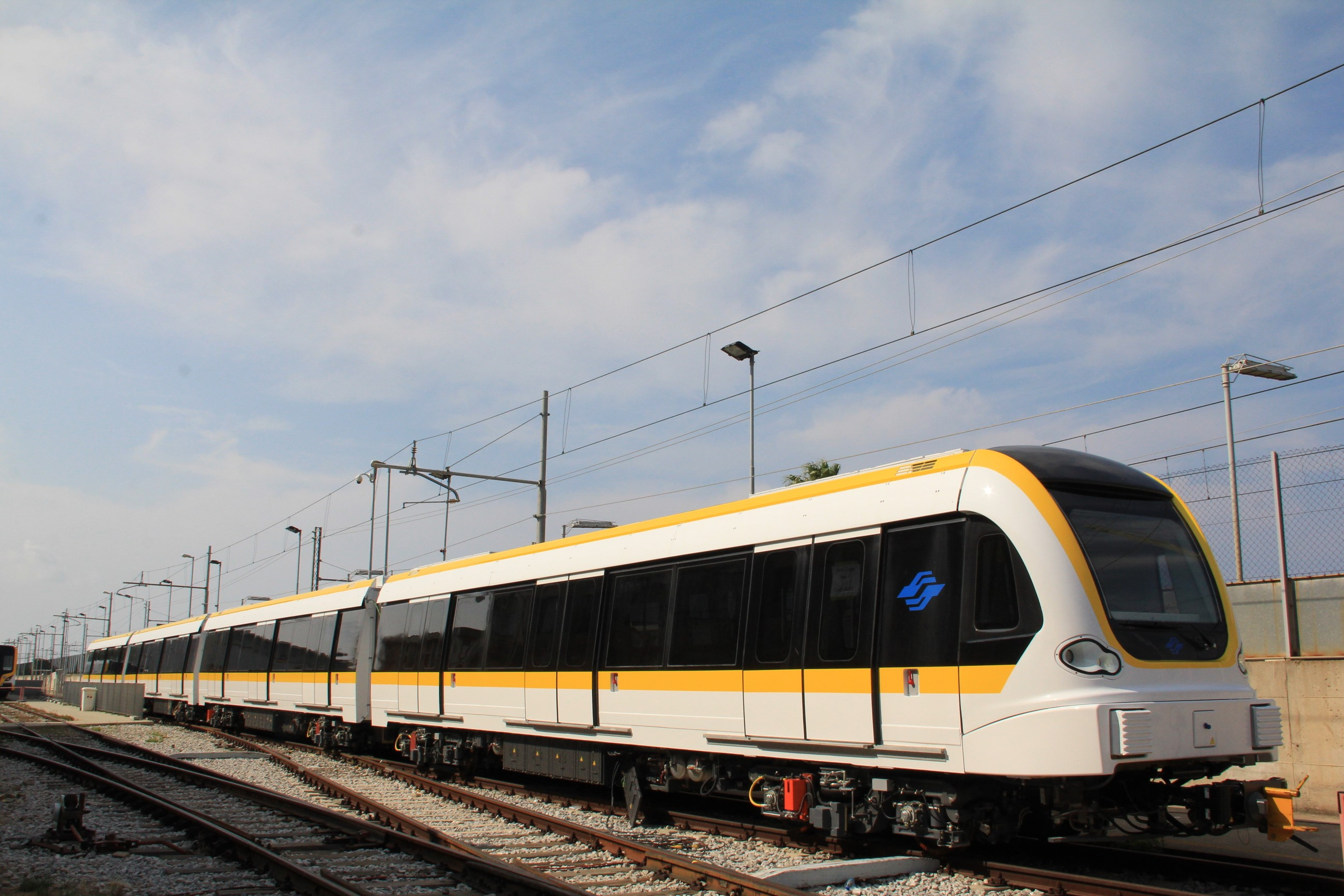
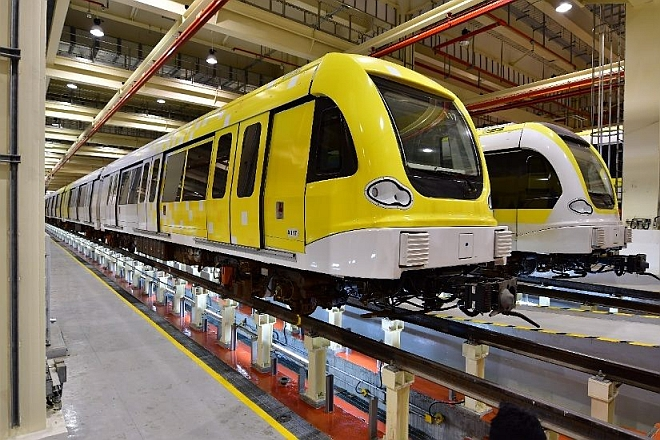

There are many differences from the designs and innovations of the existing medium-capacity trains of the Taipei Metro, except that the C610 uses the same steel wheels as the high-capacity trains, and the carriages have open-gangway connections. This greatly increases the capacity and the seats are more ergonomically designed. The trains have the external sliding doors of the other lines, instead of the plug doors found on all other trains in the Hitachi Rail Italy Driverless Metro family. Two different liveries of the C610 are currently in service. One of these variations is the standard yellow cab and white body design, while the other employs black accents along doors and windows.

=== Exterior ===
The front of the train is designed with a 20-degree sloping streamline shape, referencing the shape of a dolphin, with no destination display on the front of trains. Anti-climb devices are installed on both ends of the train, and since all station on the Circular line have platform screen doors, no fall guardrails are installed outside connecting gangways.

For the exterior livery, the train was initially designed with two paint schemes: the standard paint scheme and a "public art" paint scheme designed by Emmanuelle Moureaux, both of which used yellow and white as the main colors. The standard paint scheme uses white as the base with yellow lines running through the sides of the train, with a large black block at the window-level. The public art paint scheme uses yellow as the base with white blocks on the front of the train, and the middle section of the train body changed to white base with yellow blocks, with no black being used in the paint scheme.

=== Interior ===
The interior is mainly in a light gray colour scheme, while the handhold rings, seats, and handholding bars are all yellow. The safety equipment in the car is mostly concealed, which maximises the use of the interior space and makes it easier to walk through. The seats are all arranged in a horizontal bench-style, and are designed with a yellow gradient, with the seats on the ends of benches being dark grey. In terms of lighting, in addition to the LED ceiling lights, the front and sides of the car are equipped with large viewing windows, which provide good lighting. In addition, a luggage storage area is available near the gangway. There are CCTV cameras installed on the ceiling, and there is a door opening direction indicator light under the door cover of the information display of the doors.

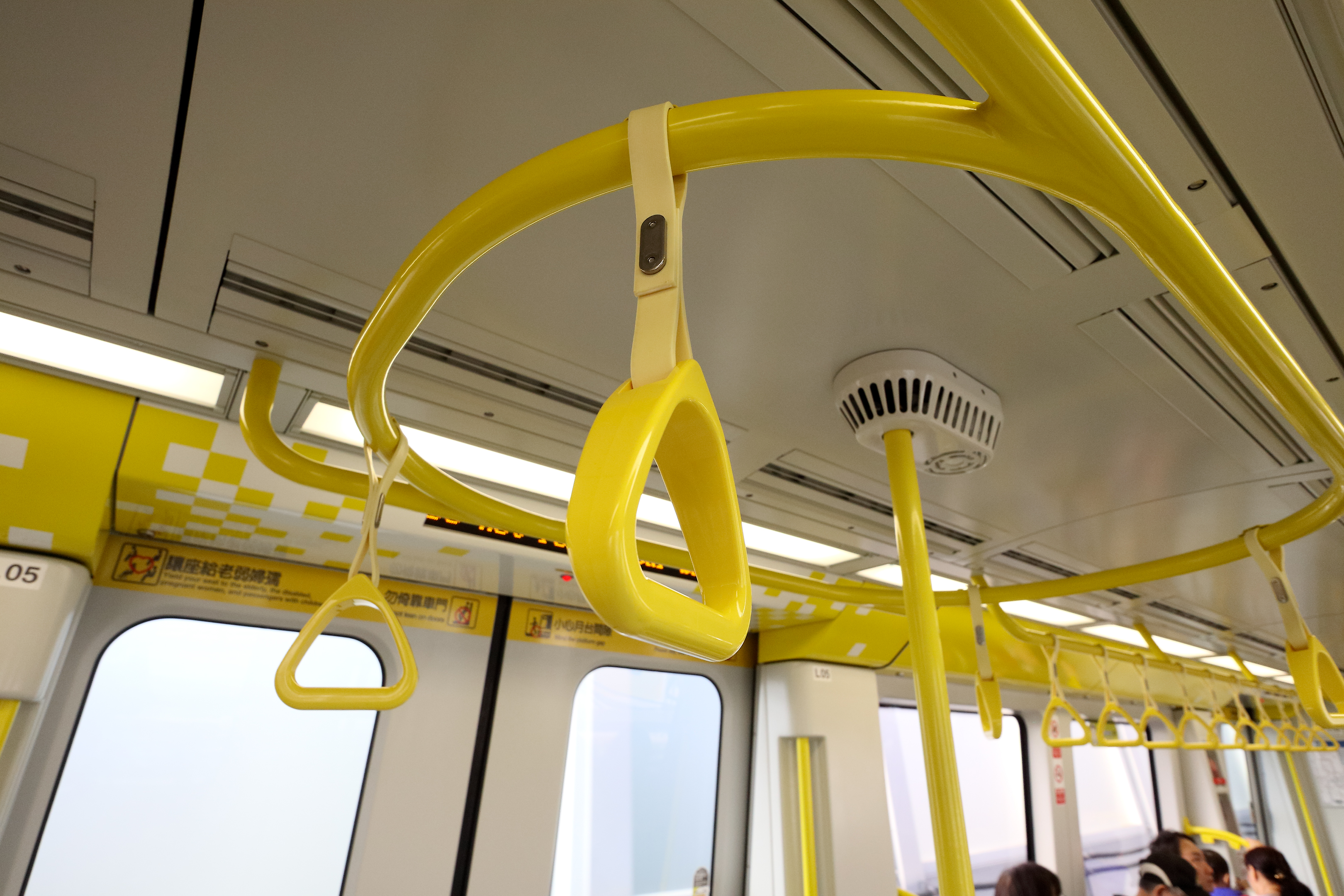
Circular Handholds

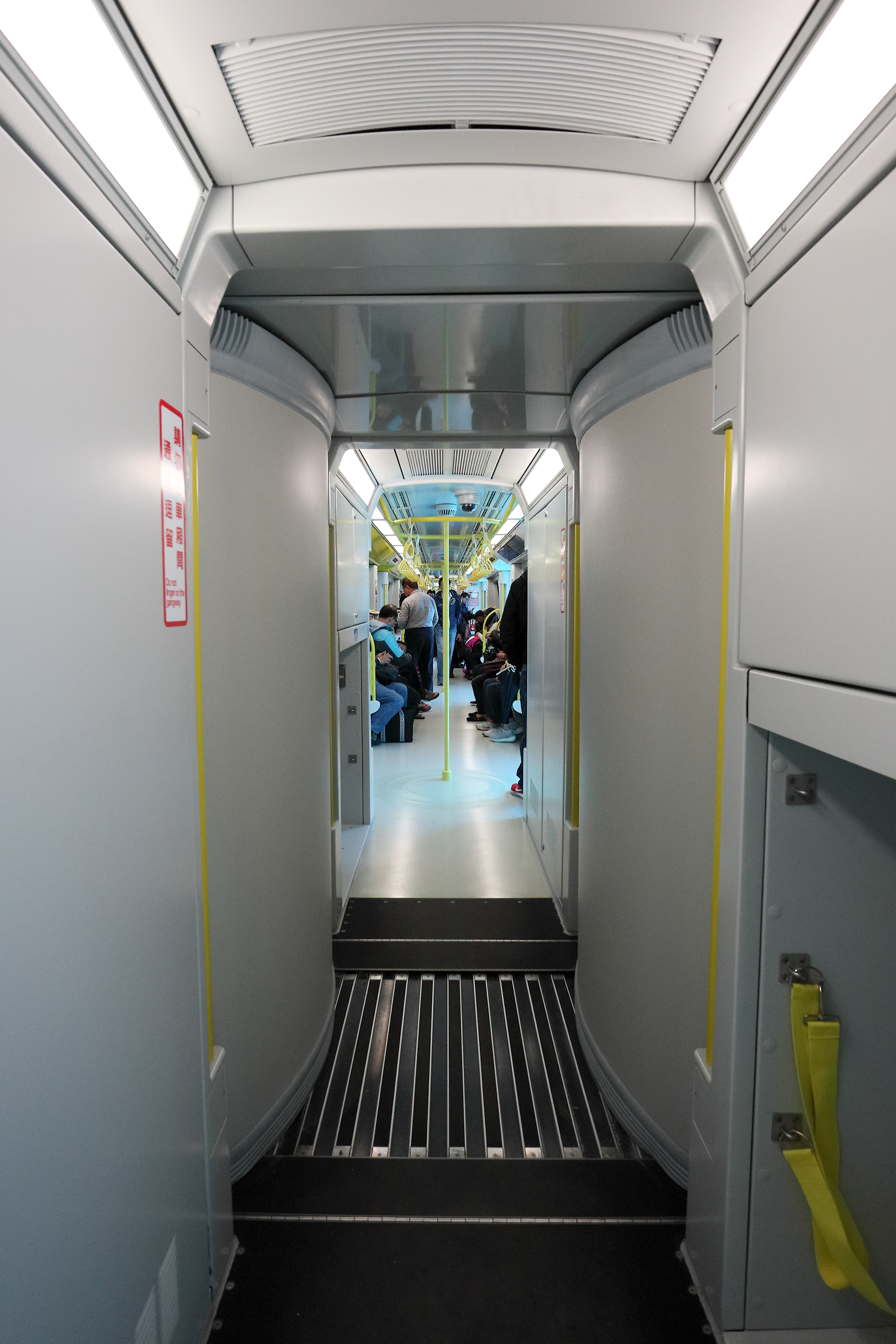
Gangway and luggage storage area

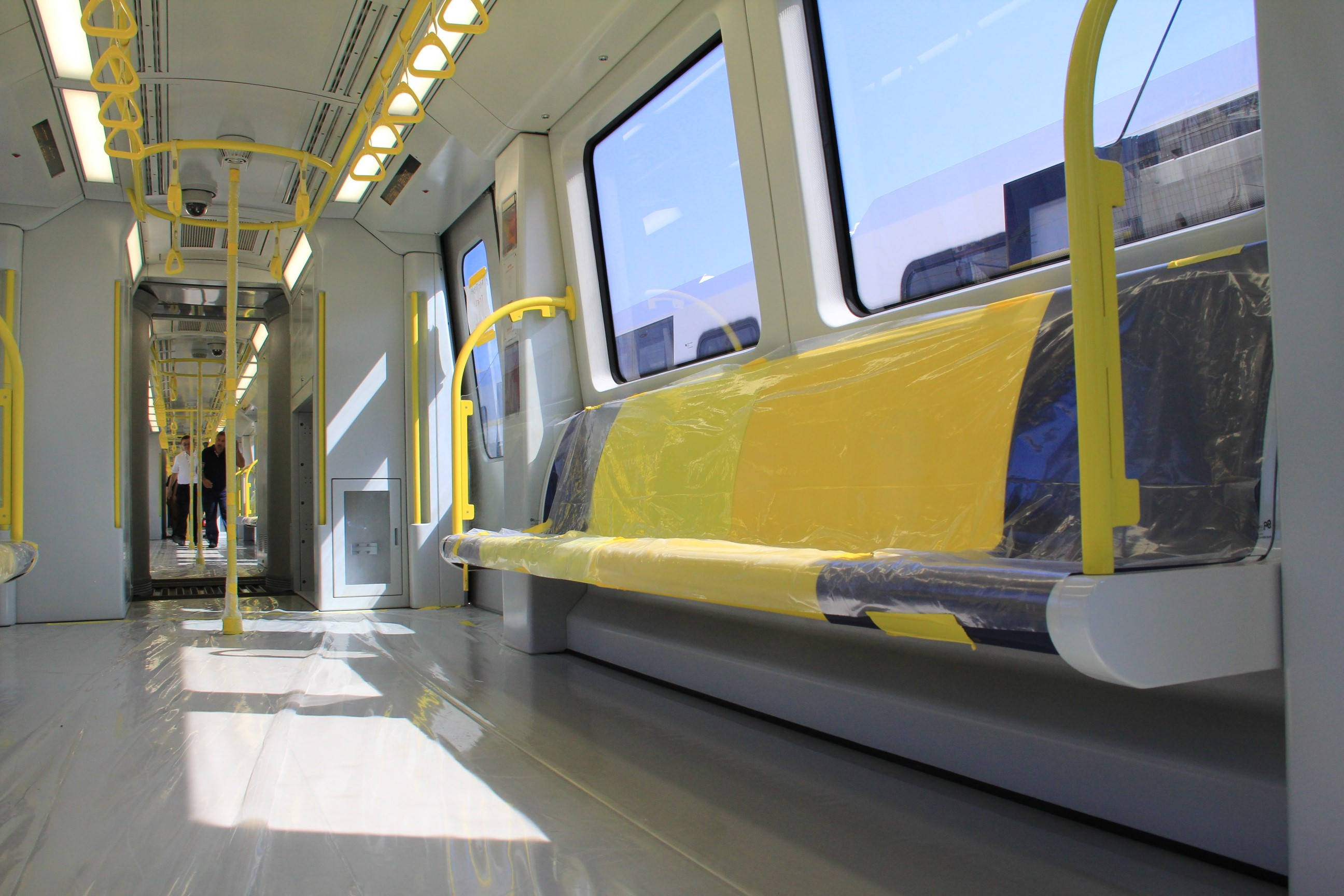
Interior of C610 EMU

== Train formation ==
A complete four-car set consists of an identical twin set of one end car (A or B) and one intermediate car (C or D) permanently coupled together. The configuration of a Circular line train in revenue service is A–C–D–B.

Each carriage is assigned its own three-digit serial number, which ranges from 101 to 117.

- The first digit after the carriage identification letter (A, C, D or B) is always a 1.
- The other two digits are the identification number of the train the car is part of.
