= Global Mall Zhonghe =

Shopping mall in Zhonghe, New Taipei, Taiwan

- 環球購物中心新北中和

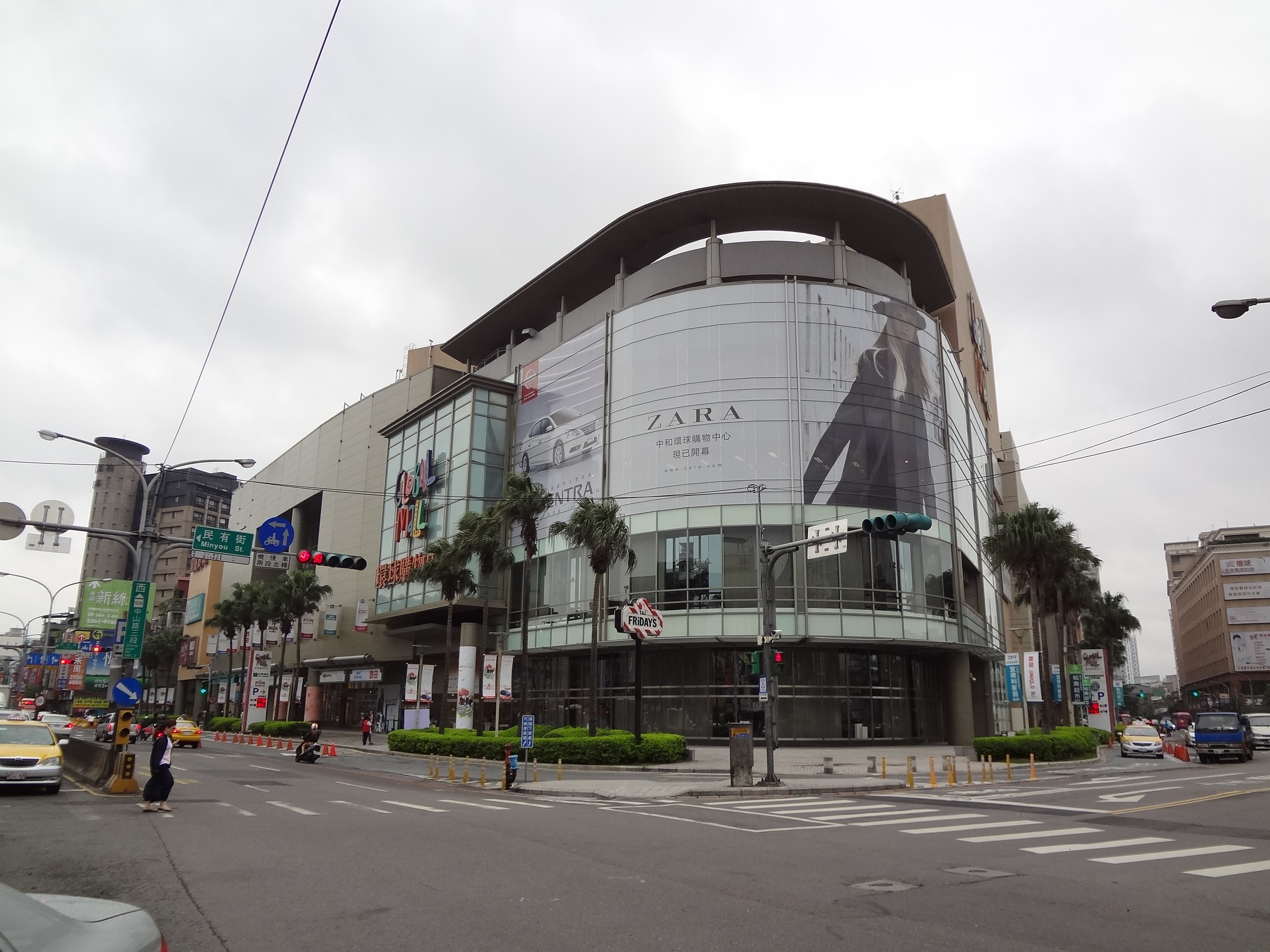
- Location: No. 122, Section 3, Zhongshan Road, Zhonghe District, New Taipei, Taiwan
- Coordinates: 25.00732445284771°N 121.47479506872077°E
- Opened: December 2005
- Floor area: 135,000 m^{2} (1,450,000 sq ft) (including parking spaces)
- Floors: 6 floors above ground 2 floor below ground
- Public transit: Zhongyuan metro station
- Website: https://www.twglobalmall.com/

Global Mall Zhonghe (Chinese: 環球購物中心新北中和) is a shopping mall in Zhonghe District, New Taipei, Taiwan that opened in December 2005. With a total floor area of 135,000 m^{2} (1,450,000 sq ft), the mall is located in close proximity to Zhongyuan metro station. It is the first store of Global Mall.

== Gallery ==
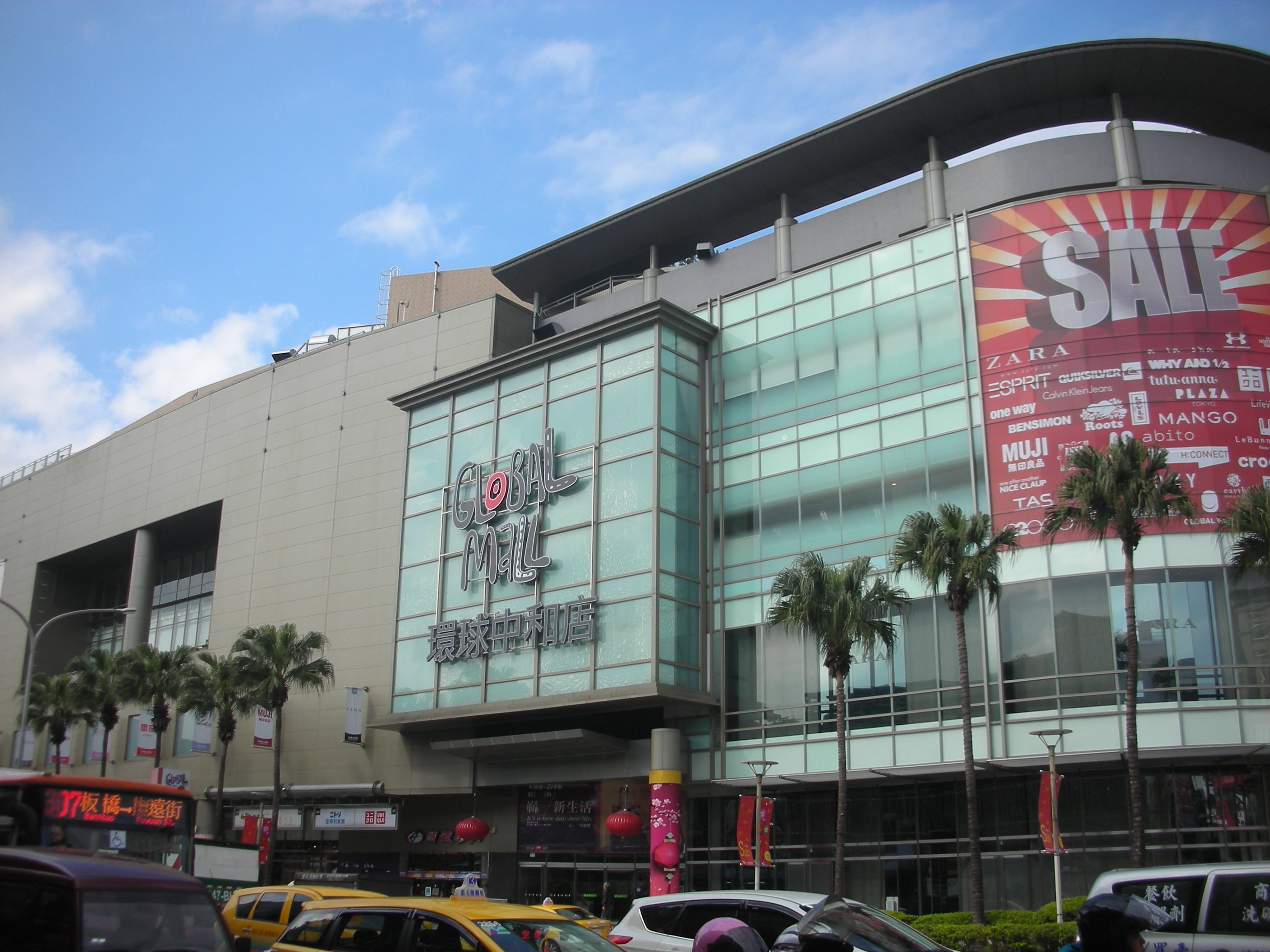
Exterior

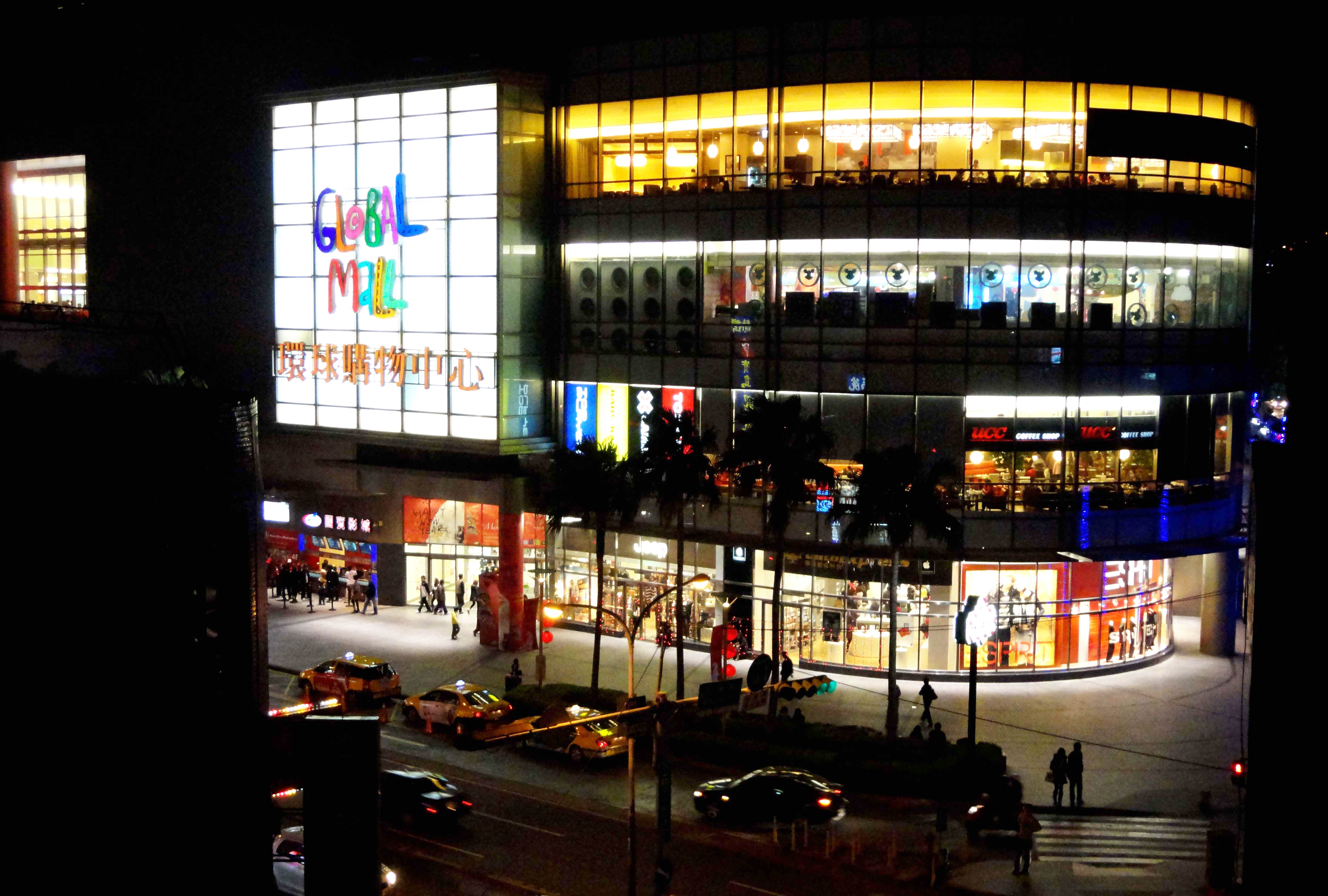
At night

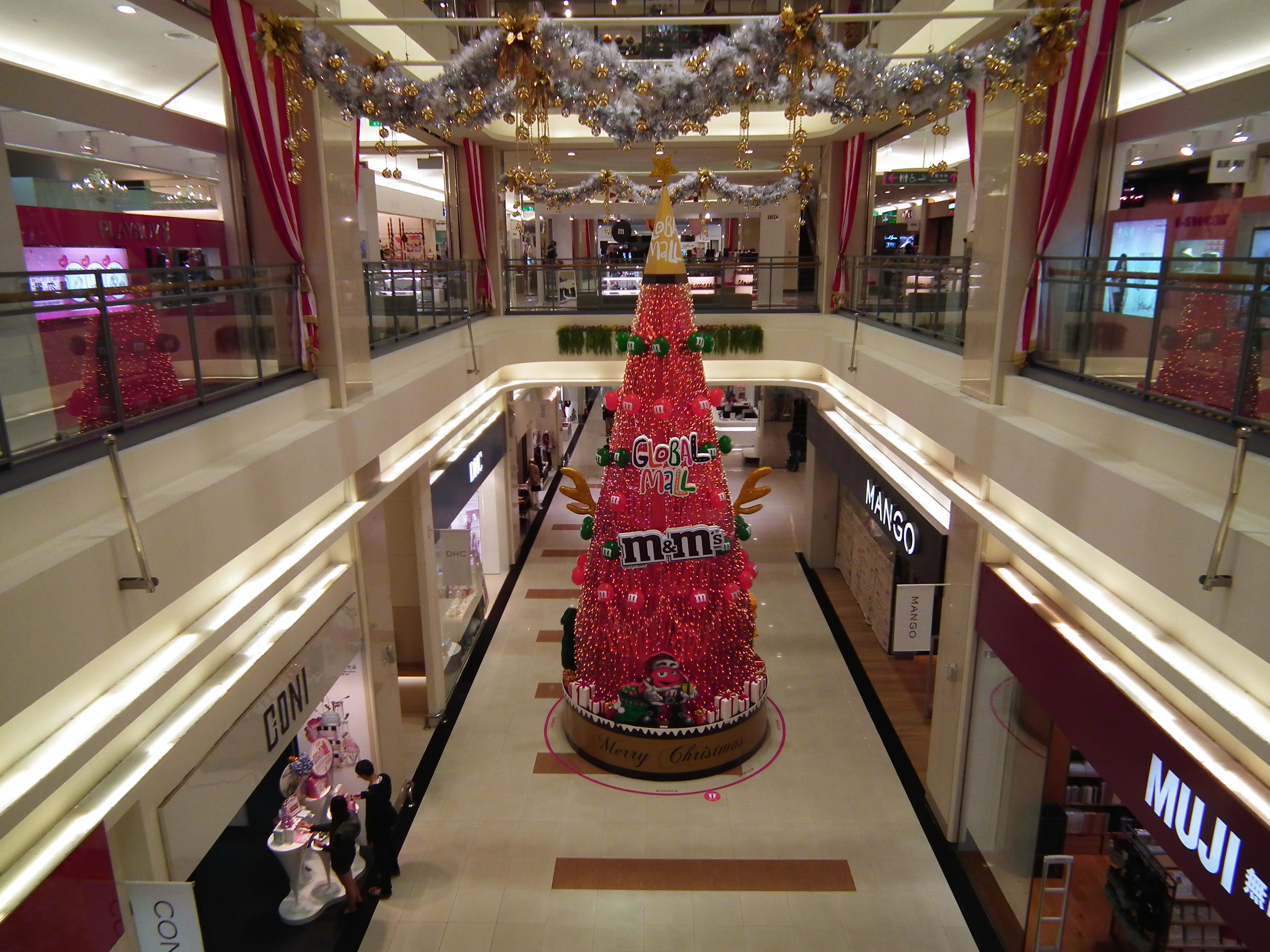
Atrium

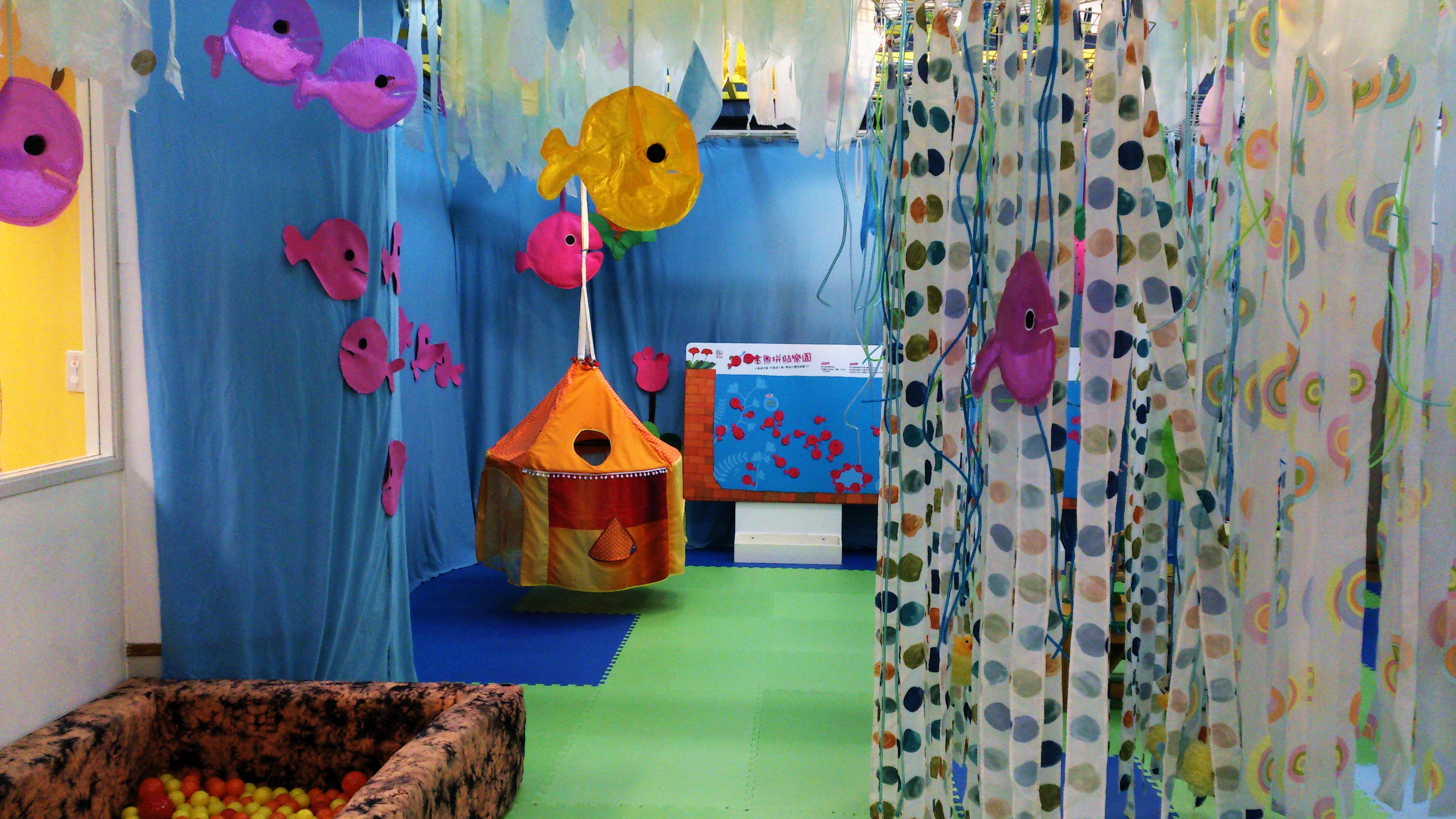
Yu Kids Island

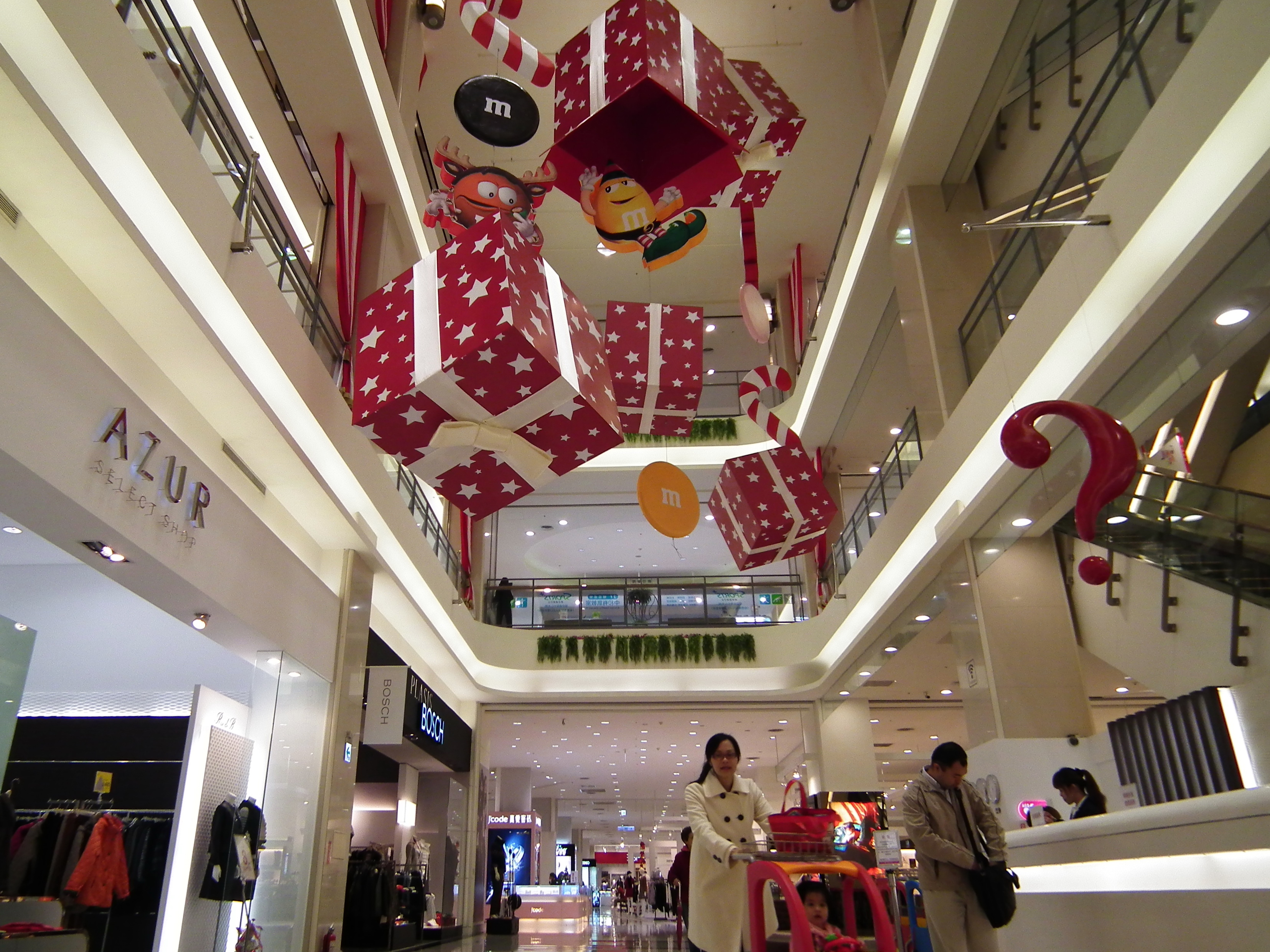

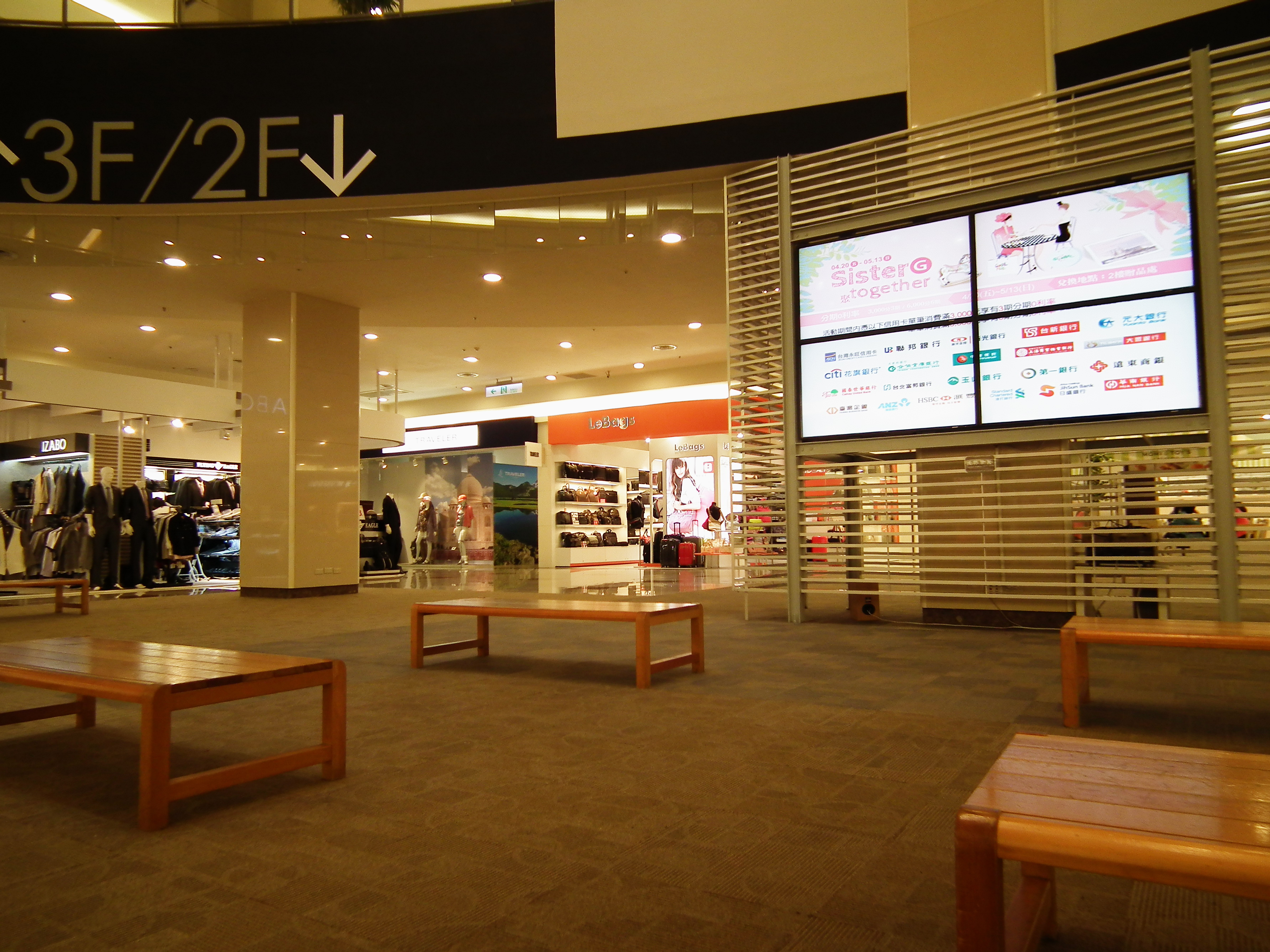

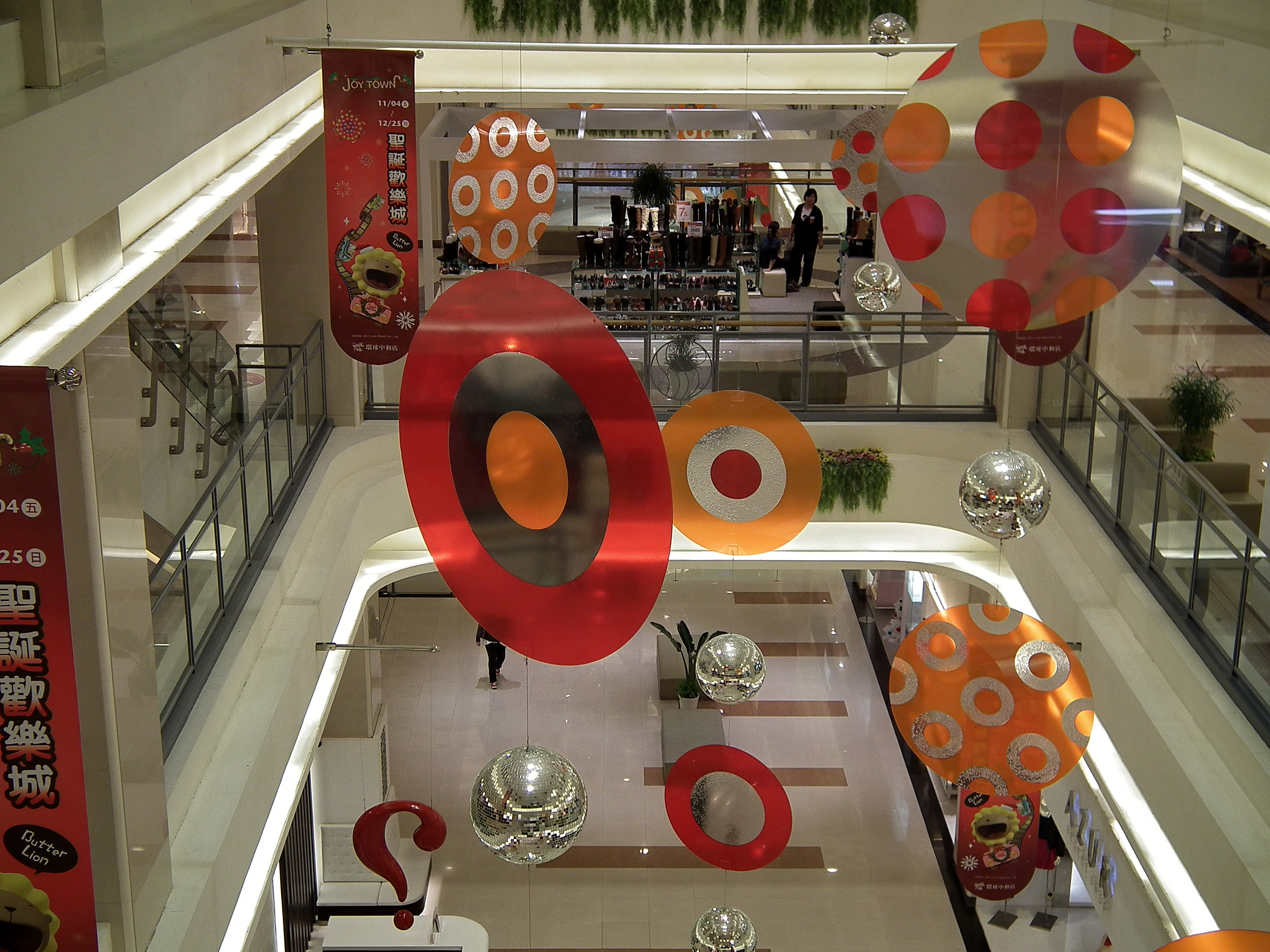

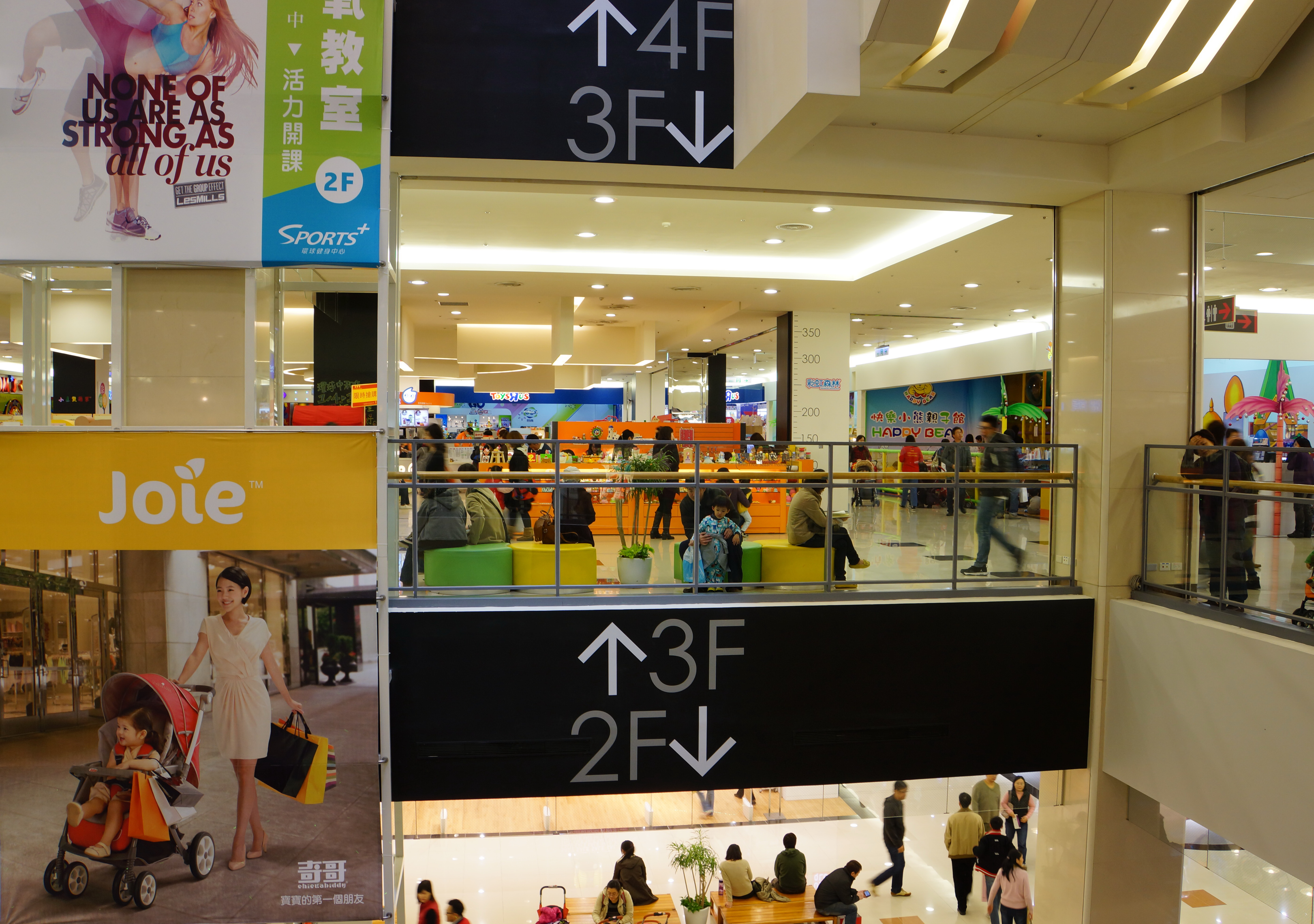
Level 3

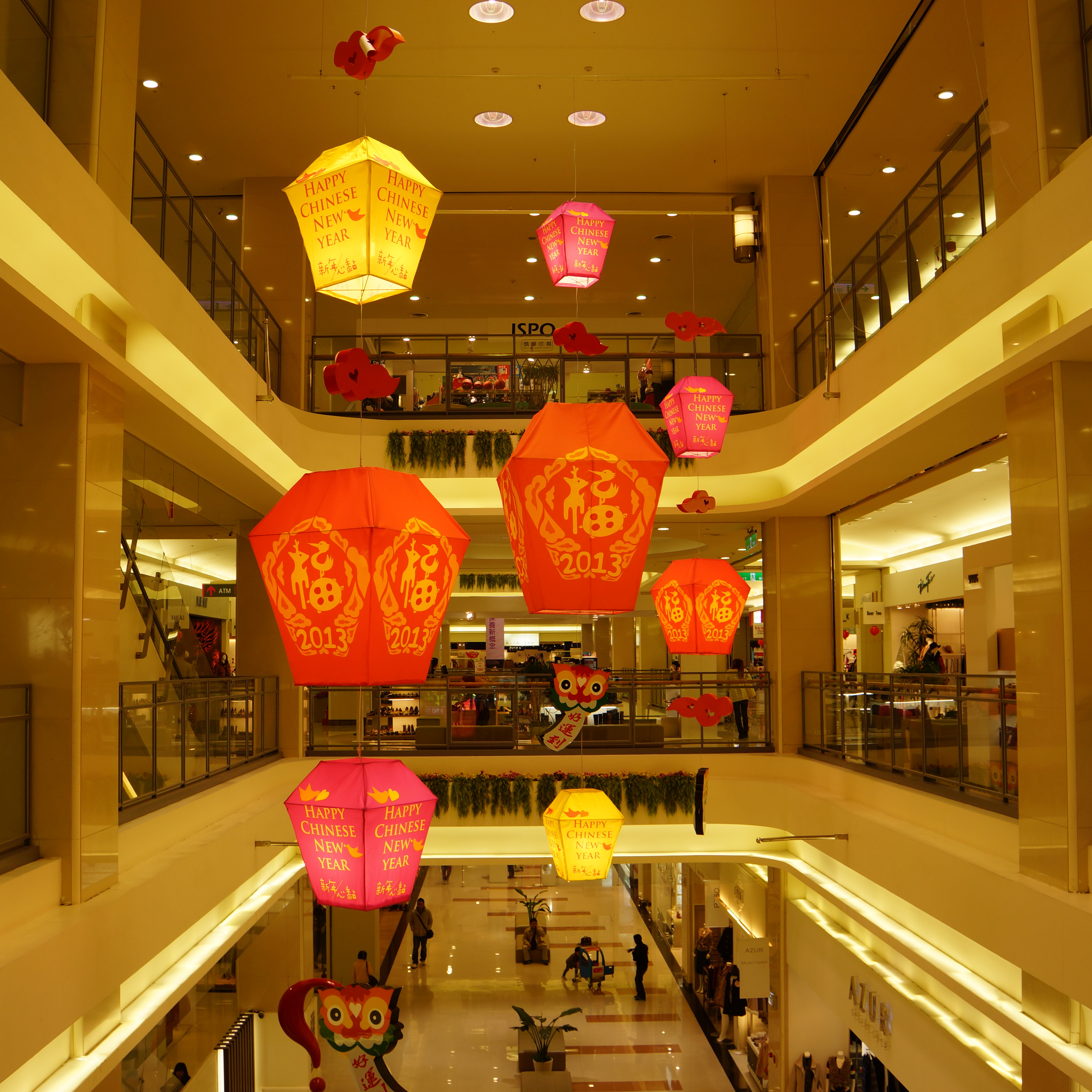

== See also ==
- List of tourist attractions in Taiwan
- Global Mall Taoyuan A8
- Global Mall Xinzuoying Station
- Global Mall Pingtung
