= Emmanuelle Moureaux =

French architect

"Forest of Numbers" (Tokyo, 2017)

Emmanuelle Moureaux (born 1971) is a Tokyo based French architect and designer who is known for implementation of color throughout her designs. Emmanuelle fell in love with Ikebukuro, a city center of Tokyo, Japan, while doing research for her thesis and has lived there since 1996. She founded emmanuelle moureaux architecture + design in 2003. The concept driving all of her work is shikiri, which literally means "dividing and creating space through colors." Emmanuelle created this concept of using color as a three dimensional element that can create space rather than a finish applied to surfaces as an afterthought.

Emmanuelle has many works in architecture including the Sugamo Shinkin Bank Shimura Branch, but also designs art installations, interiors, and products. 100 Colors is an art installation series that implements color in ways that fortify shikiri. Even though nearly all of the installations share a common concept, each one is unique and successful in its own. Emmanuelle hopes to create emotion through color and allow people to experience color through touch and feel as well. This will show that colors can not only make space, but also create a space with additional layers of human emotion.

== Works ==
- "Forest of Numbers"
- "Slices of Time"
- "Color Mixing
- "Mirai"
- "Universe of Words"
- Sugamo Shinkin Bank: Nakaaoki Branch
- Sugamo Shinkin Bank: Shimura Branch
- "100 colors"

== Bibliography ==
- Bird, Winifred A. (October 2014). "Emmanuelle Moureaux: A French Architect Makes Her Saturated Mark on Tokyo's Streetscapes". Dwell: 52–53.
- Simpson, Kate (February 2020). "Layers of Complexity". Aesthetica (93): 40–45.
- Bird, Winifred (1 November 2019). "Festival of Color : A Tokyo Installation by Emmanuelle Moureaux Celebrates a Beloved Japanese Brand". Interior Design: 134–141.
- Popp, Peter (January 2016). "Ausstellungsinstallation 'Bunshi' in Tokio = 'Bunshi' Installation in Tokyo : [Emmanuelle Moureaux Architecture + Design, Tokio]". Detail Inside (2): 42–43.
