= Zhongyuan railway station =

Railway station in Zhengzhou, China

Zhongyuan 中原
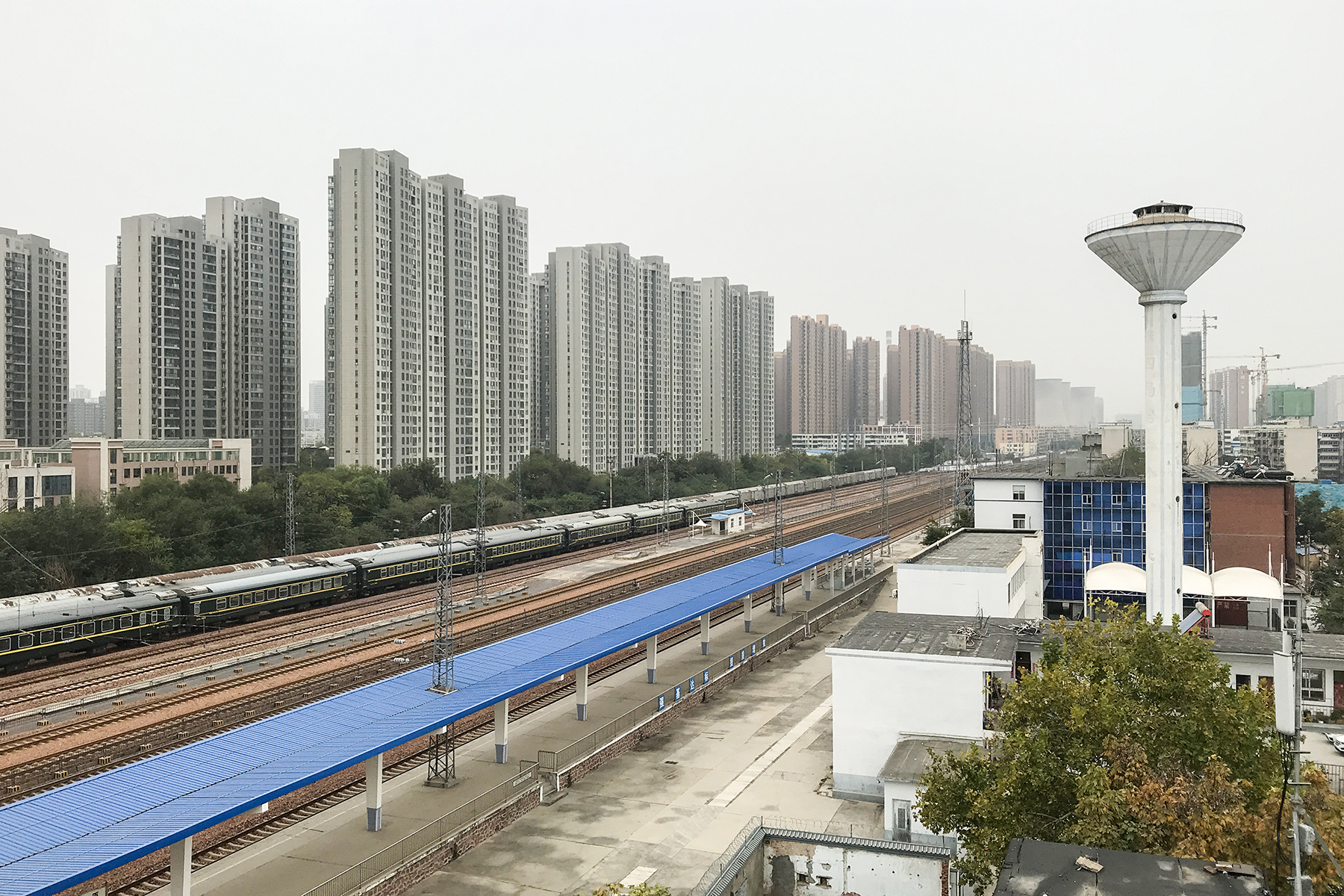

General information
- Location: 26 Xizhan Road; Zhongyuan District, Zhengzhou, Henan; China
- Coordinates: 34.7651°N 113.6156°E
- Operator: CR Zhengzhou
- Line: Longhai Railway
- Platforms: 3
- Tracks: 11

Other information
- Station code: 39062 (TMIS code); ZXF (telegraph code); ZZX (Pinyin code)

History
- Opened: 1956
- Former names: Zhengzhou West (Chinese: 郑州西)
Location
- Location within Zhengzhou Location within Henan Location within China

The Zhongyuan railway station (Chinese: 中原站) is a railway station of Longhai railway located in Zhongyuan District, Zhengzhou, Henan, China.

The station is currently out of passenger services.

== History ==
The station was opened in 1956 as Zhengzhou West railway station (Chinese: 郑州西站) to serve the then newly development industrial zone in western Zhengzhou.

With the renaming of the Xingyang South railway station on the Zhengzhou-Xi'an high-speed railway to Zhengzhou West railway station, this station was renamed as Zhongyuan railway station effective from 10 July 2014.
