= Qiaohe metro station =

Metro station in New Tapei, Taiwan

Qiaohe 橋和
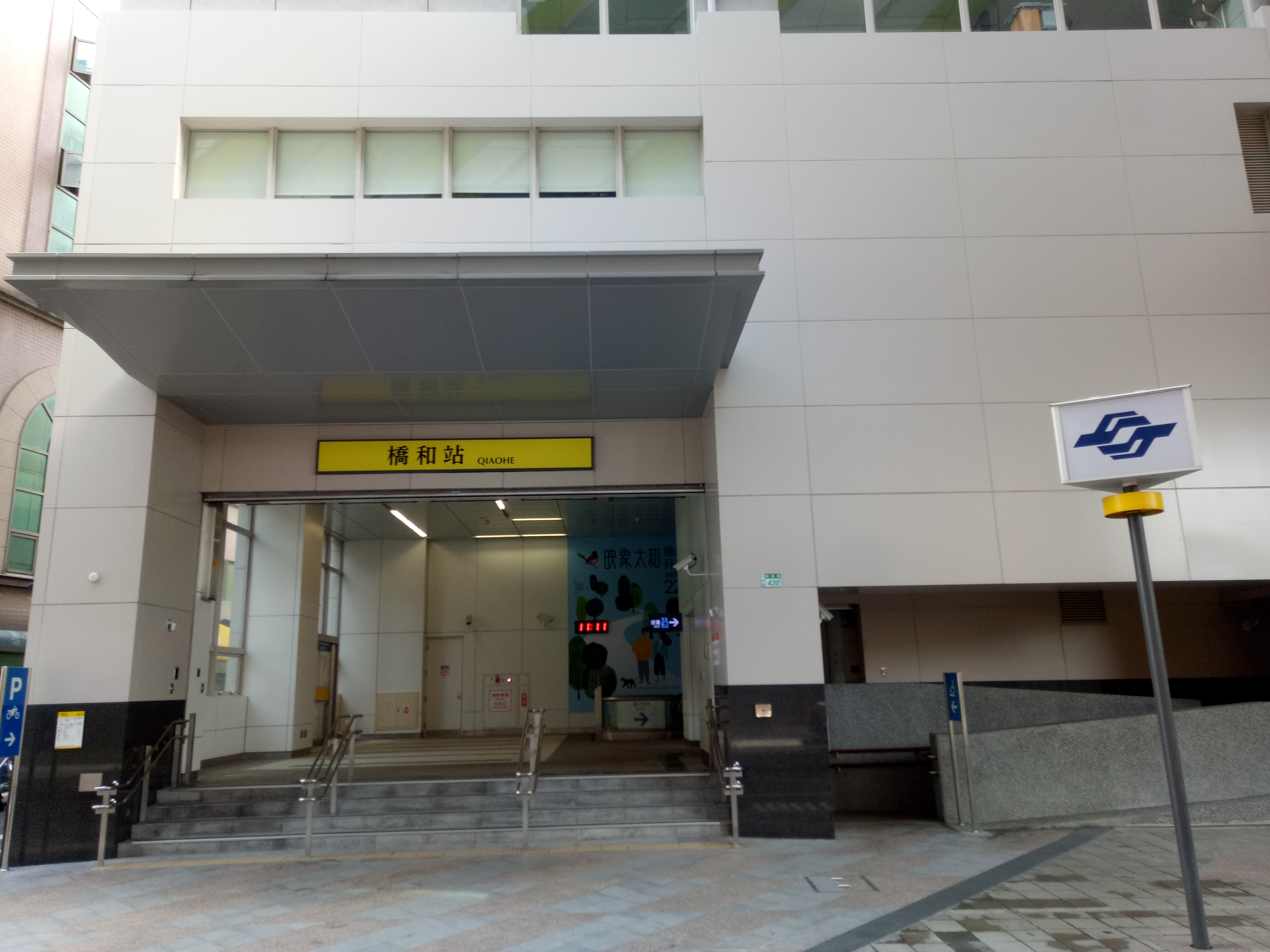
- Station entrance

Chinese name
- Traditional Chinese: 橋和
- Simplified Chinese: 桥和
Transcriptions
Standard Mandarin
- Hanyu Pinyin: Qiáohé
- Bopomofo: ㄑㄧㄠˊㄏㄜˊ
- Wade–Giles: Ch'iao²-hê²
Hakka
- Pha̍k-fa-sṳ: Khiâu-fò
Southern Min
- Tâi-lô: Kiô-hô

General information
- Location: Zhonghe, New Taipei; Taiwan
- Coordinates: 25.00461°N 121.49024°E
- Operated by: New Taipei Metro
- Line: Circular line (Y13)
- Connections: Bus stop

Construction
- Structure type: Elevated

Other information
- Station code: Y13

History
- Opened: 31 January 2020

Services
| Preceding station | New Taipei Metro | Following station |
|---|---|---|
| Zhonghe towards Dapinglin | Circular line | Zhongyuan towards NT Industrial Park |
Location

Qiaohe station is a station on the New Taipei Metro's Circular line. It opened on 31 January 2020. It is located in Zhonghe District, New Taipei, Taiwan.

== Station layout ==
| 5F | Side platform, doors will open on the left |
| 5F | Platform 2 | ← Circular line toward Dapinglin (Y12 Zhonghe) → |
| 3F | Concourse | Lobby, information desk, automatic ticket dispensing machines, one-way faregates, shops, restrooms (outside paid area) |
| 3F | Side platform, doors will open on the right |
| 3F | Platform 1 | ← Circular line toward New Taipei Industrial Park (Y13 Zhongyuan) |
Street level
| Street level | Ground level | Entrance/exit |

== Around the station ==
- Costco Zhonghe Store (300m southeast of the station)
