= Zhongyuan metro station =

Metro station in New Tapei, Taiwan

Zhongyuan 中原
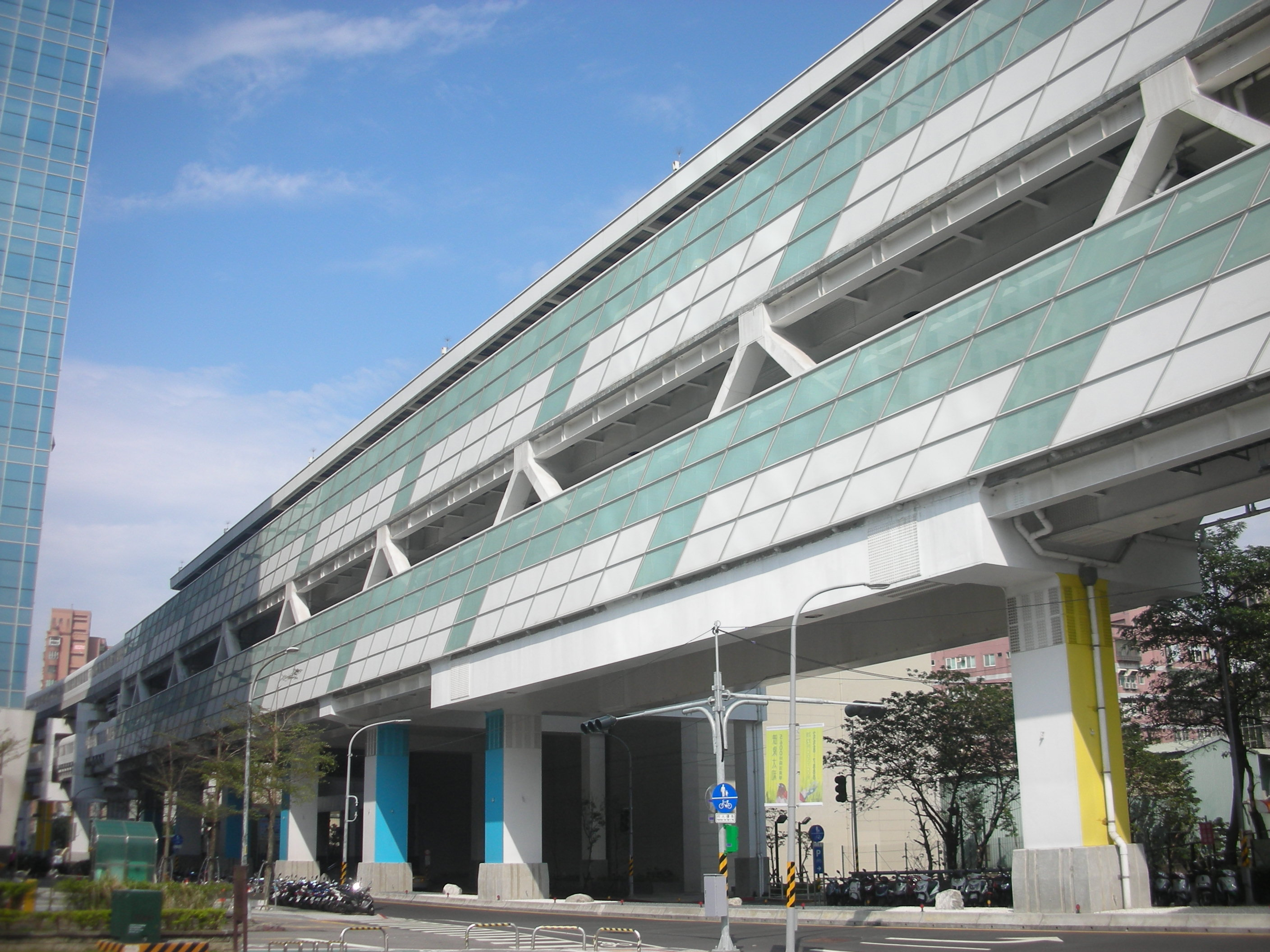
- Station exterior

Chinese name
- Chinese: 中原
Transcriptions
Standard Mandarin
- Hanyu Pinyin: Zhōngyuán
- Bopomofo: ㄓㄨㄥㄩㄢˊ
- Wade–Giles: Chung¹-yuan²
Hakka
- Pha̍k-fa-sṳ: Chûng-ngièn
Southern Min
- Tâi-lô: Tiong-guân

General information
- Location: Zhonghe, New Taipei; Taiwan
- Coordinates: 25.0082°N 121.4843°E
- Operated by: New Taipei Metro
- Line: Circular line (Y14)
- Connections: Bus stop

Construction
- Structure type: Elevated

Other information
- Station code: Y14

History
- Opened: 31 January 2020

Services
Preceding station	New Taipei Metro	Following station
Qiaohe towards Dapinglin	Circular line	Banxin towards NT Industrial Park
Location

Zhongyuan station is a station on the New Taipei Metro's Circular line. It opened on 31 January 2020. It is located in Zhonghe District, New Taipei, Taiwan.

== Station layout ==
5F	Side platform, doors will open on the left
5F	Platform 2	← Circular line toward Dapinglin (Y12 Qiaohe) →
3F	Concourse	Lobby, information desk, automatic ticket dispensing machines, one-way faregates, shops, restrooms (outside paid area)
3F	Side platform, doors will open on the right
3F	Platform 1	← Circular line toward New Taipei Industrial Park (Y13 Banxin)
Street level
Street level	Ground level	Entrance/exit

== Around the station ==
- MIT International Science Park (100m east of the station)
- MSI Technology (400m east of the station)
- Guangzhi Park (850m northeast of the station)
- Yuanshan Park (1.1km southwest of the station)
- Global Mall Zhonghe Store (1.3km southwest of the station)
- Min Xiang Market (1.7km southwest of the station)

== Gallery ==
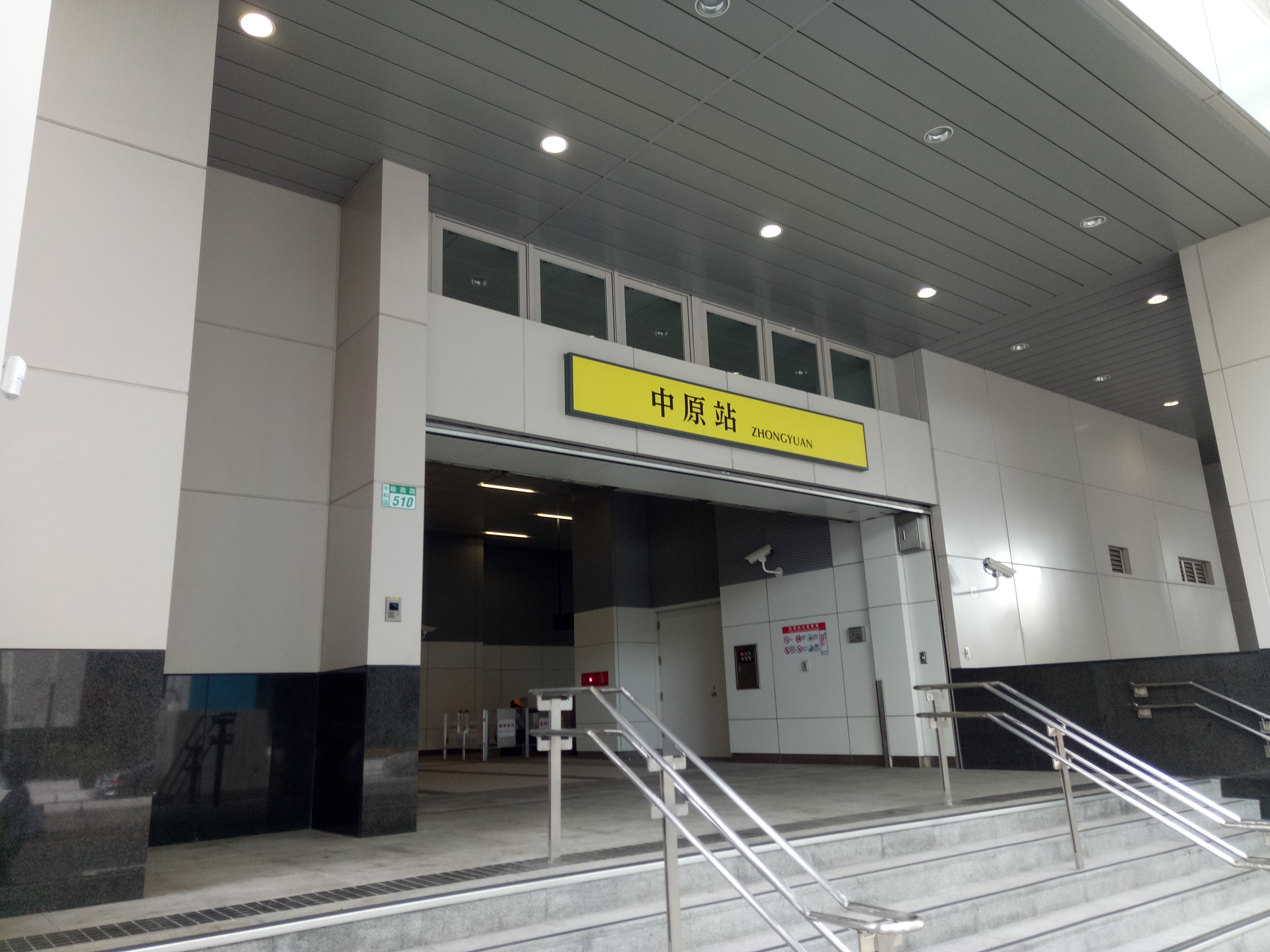
Station Entrance

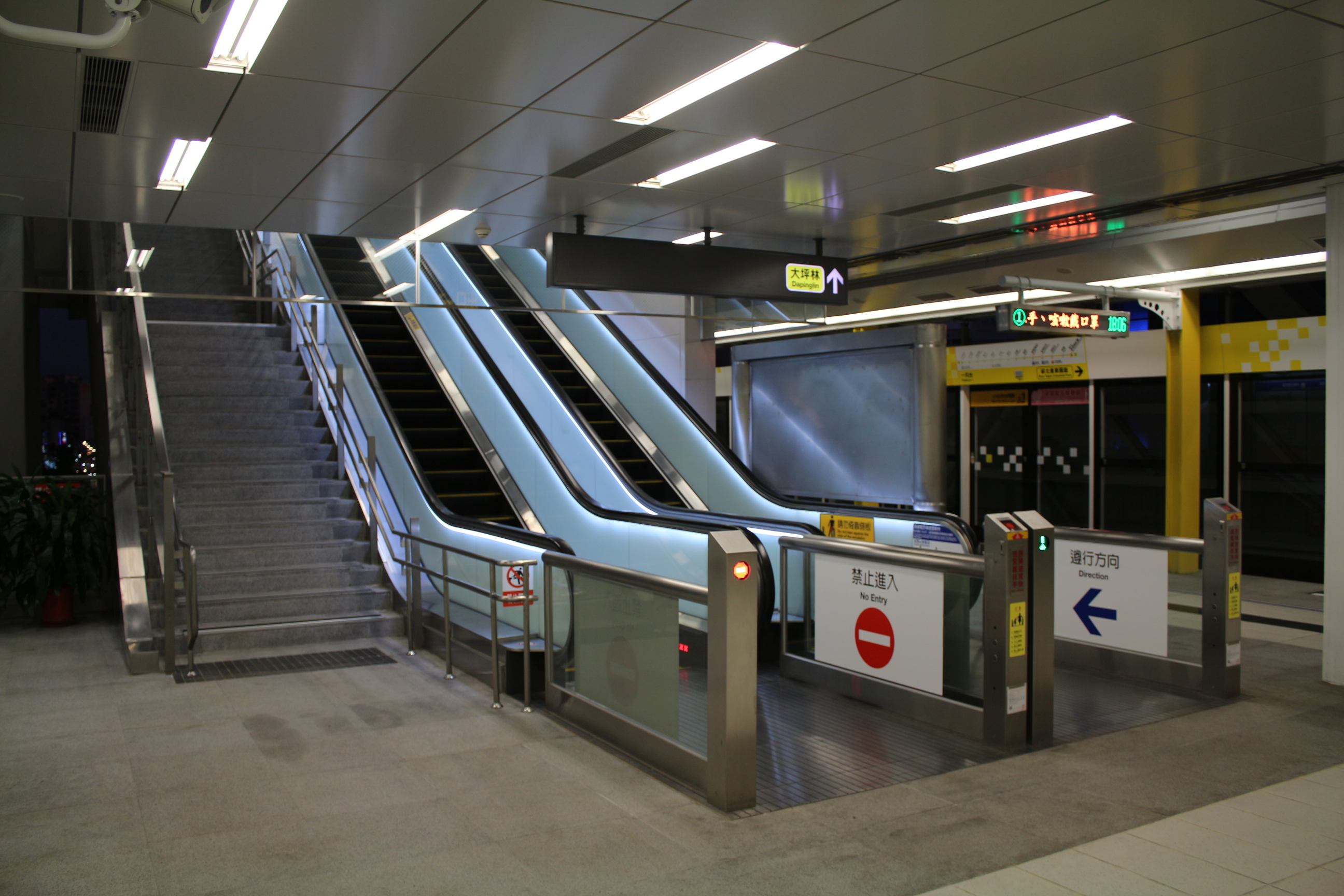
Platform 1

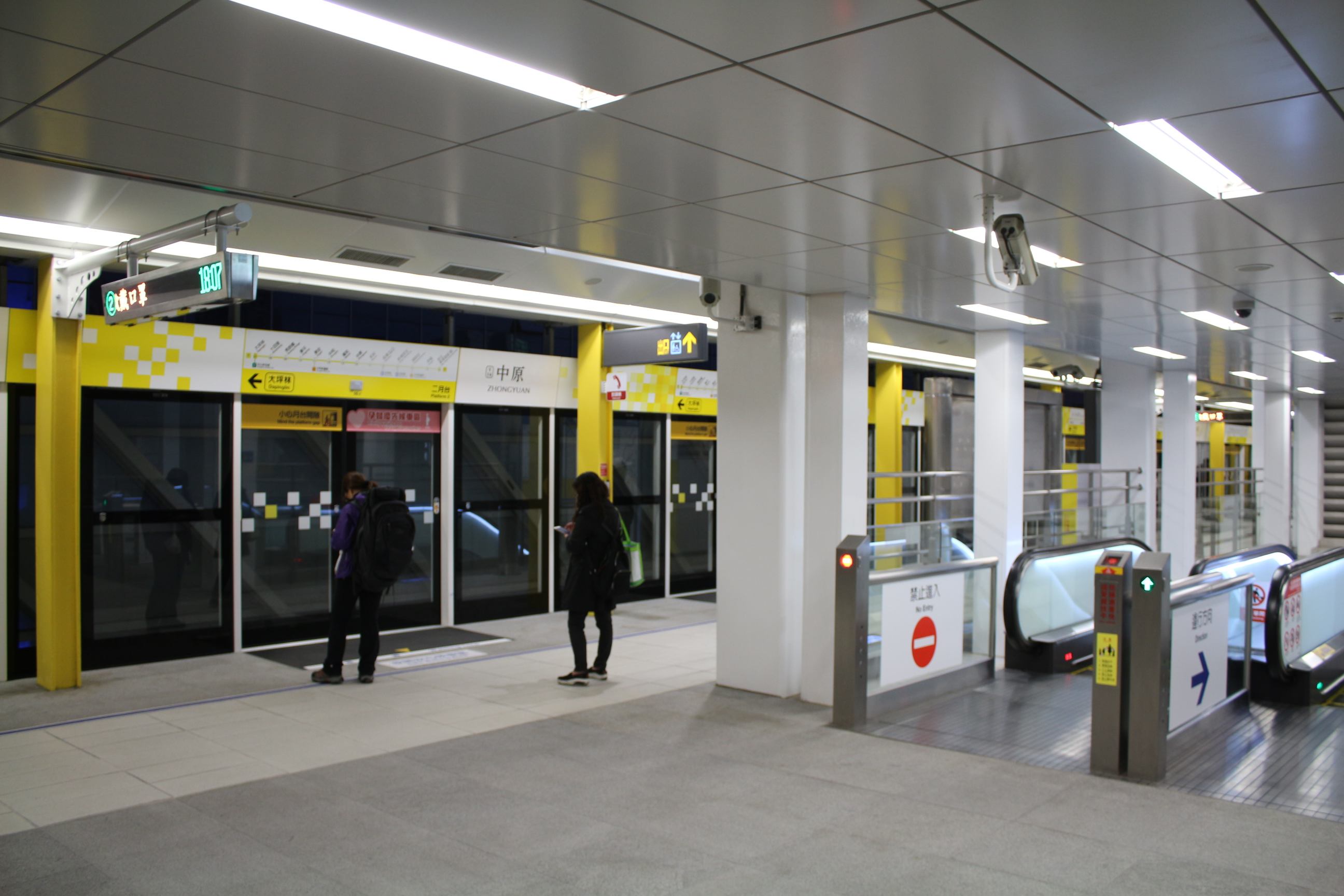
Platform 2
