= Green Mountain line =

Light rail line in New Taipei, Taiwan

Green Mountain Line
Green Mountain Line
淡海輕軌綠山線
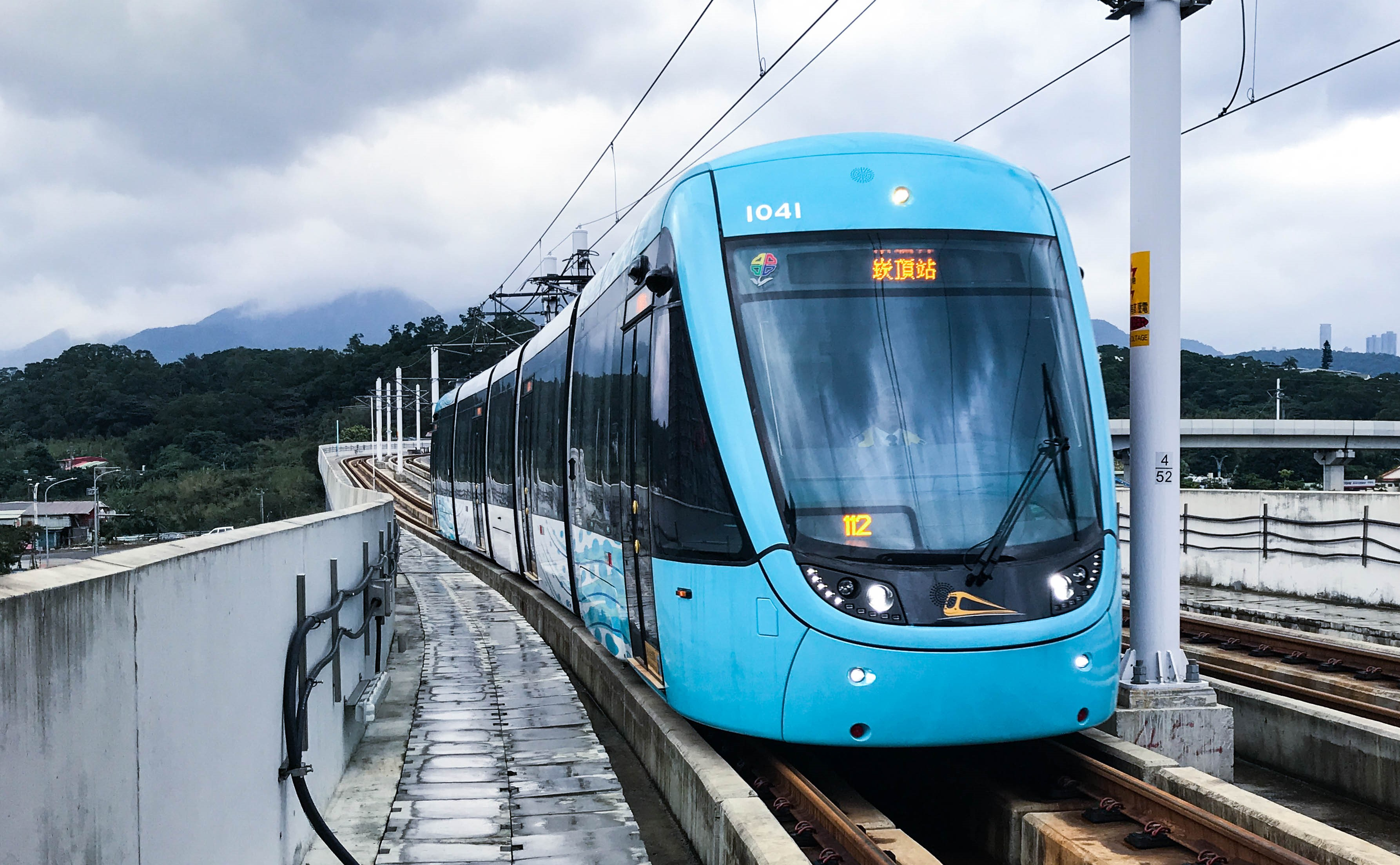
- Danhai Light Rail Train

Overview
- Status: In service
- Locale: New Taipei, Taiwan
- Termini: Hongshulin; Kanding
- Stations: 11

Service
- Type: Light Rail
- System: New Taipei Metro
- Operator: New Taipei Metro, Co.
- Depot: Danhai Depot

History
- Opened: 23 December 2018

Technical
- Number of tracks: 2
- Character: At-Grade/Elevated
- Track gauge: 1,435 mm (4 ft 8 1/2 in)

The Green Mountain Line (Chinese: 淡海輕軌綠山線) of the Danhai Light Rail Transit system is a light rail line in Tamsui District, New Taipei, Taiwan. The route between Hongshulin Station and Tamsui District Office Station is elevated; the rest of the route is at-grade. The line opened in December 2018 and runs from Hongshulin Station northward and turns west along Zhongzheng East Road, Highway No. 2, Binhai Road and Shalun Road. Seven of its eleven stations are elevated, with the remaining four at ground level. Bike sharing service YouBike is available at seven stations.

== Stations ==
Code	Station Name		Character	Connection	Location	
Code	English	Chinese	Character	Connection	Location	
V01	Hongshulin	紅樹林	Elevated	(R27)	Tamsui	New Taipei
V02	Ganzhenlin	竿蓁林	Elevated		Tamsui	New Taipei
V03	Danjin Denggong	淡金鄧公	Elevated		Tamsui	New Taipei
V04	Tamkang University	淡江大學	Elevated		Tamsui	New Taipei
V05	Danjin Beixin	淡金北新	Elevated		Tamsui	New Taipei
V06	Xinshi 1st Rd	新市一路	Elevated		Tamsui	New Taipei
V07	Tamsui District Office	淡水行政中心	Elevated		Tamsui	New Taipei
V08	Binhai Yishan	濱海義山	At-Grade		Tamsui	New Taipei
V09	Binhai Shalun	濱海沙崙	At-Grade	Blue Coast line	Tamsui	New Taipei
V10	Danhai New Town	淡海新市鎮	At-Grade		Tamsui	New Taipei
V11	Kanding	崁頂	At-Grade		Tamsui	New Taipei

== See also ==
- Transportation in Taiwan
- Danhai Light Rail Transit
