= Xinshi 1st Rd light rail station =

Light rail station in New Taipei, Taiwan

Coordinates: 25.1838°N 121.4483°E

Xinshi 1st Rd V06 新市一路站
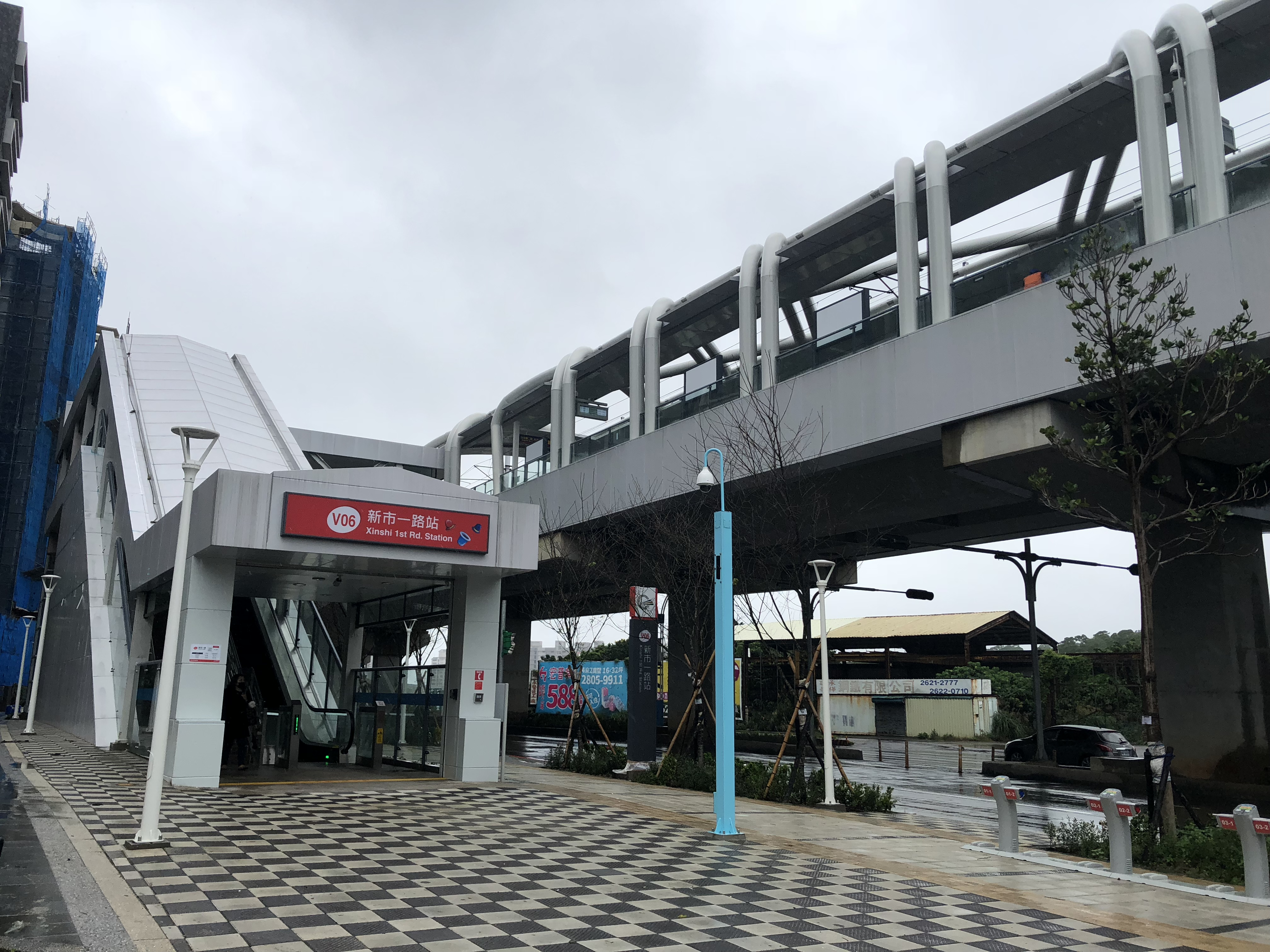
- Station entrance

General information
- Location: Tamsui, New Taipei; Taiwan
- Operated by: New Taipei Metro
- Platforms: 2 side platforms
- Connections: Bus stop

Construction
- Structure type: Elevated
- Accessible: Yes

Other information
- Station code: V06

History
- Opened: 23 December 2018

Services
Preceding station	New Taipei Metro	Following station
Tamsui District Office towards Kanding or Tamsui Fisherman's Wharf	Danhai light rail	Danjin Beixin towards Hongshulin

Xinshi 1st Rd (Chinese: 新市一路站; pinyin: Xīnshì Yīlù Zhàn) is a light rail station of the Danhai light rail, which is operated by New Taipei Metro. It is located in Tamsui District, New Taipei, Taiwan.

== Station overview ==
The station is an elevated station with two side platforms. It is located above Provincial Highway 2 near its intersection with Xinshi 1st Road Section 3.

== Station layout ==
2F	Side platform, doors open on the right
2F	Platform 2	← Danhai light rail to Hongshulin (V05 Danjin Beixin)
2F	Platform 1	→ Danhai light rail to Kanding (V07 Tamsui District Office) →
2F	Side platform, doors open on the right
Street level	Entrance	Elevator, escalator, stairs
