= Tamkang University light rail station =

Light rail station in New Taipei, Taiwan

Coordinates: 25.1769°N 121.4562°E

Tamkang University V04 淡江大學站
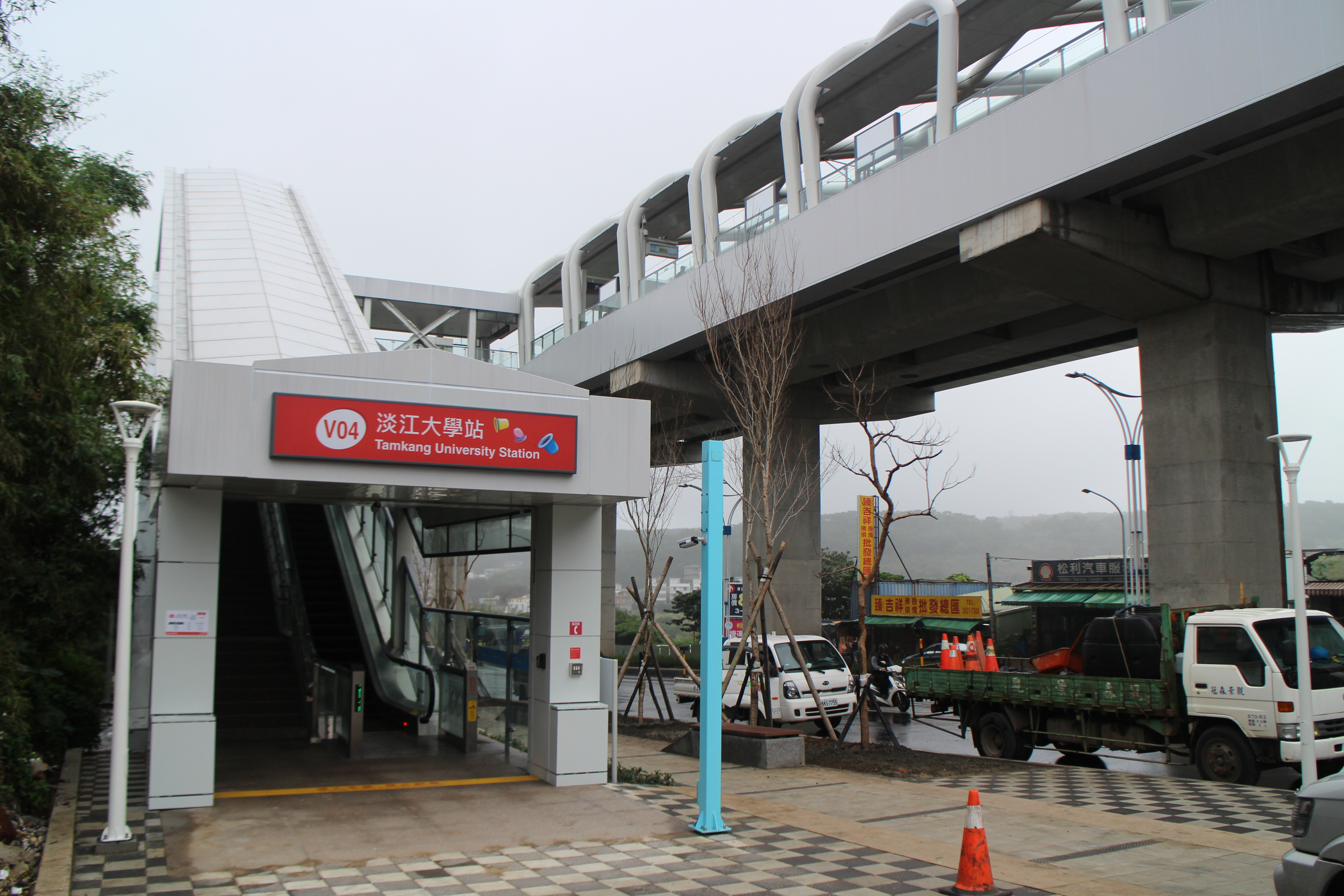
- Station entrance

General information
- Location: Tamsui, New Taipei; Taiwan
- Operator: New Taipei Metro
- Platforms: 2 side platforms
- Connections: Bus stop

Construction
- Structure type: Elevated
- Accessible: Yes

Other information
- Station code: V04

History
- Opened: 23 December 2018

Services
Preceding station	New Taipei Metro	Following station
Danjin Beixin towards Kanding or Tamsui Fisherman's Wharf	Danhai LRT	Danjin Denggong towards Hongshulin
Location

Tamkang University (Chinese: 淡江大學站; pinyin: Dànjiāng Dàxué Zhàn) is a light rail station of the Danhai light rail, which is operated by New Taipei Metro. It is located in Tamsui District, New Taipei, Taiwan.

== Station overview ==
The station is an elevated station with two side platforms. It is located above Provincial Highway 2 near its intersection with Shuiyuan Road.

== Station layout ==
2F	Side platform, doors open on the right
2F	Platform 2	← Danhai light rail to Hongshulin (V03 Danjin Denggong)
2F	Platform 1	→ Danhai light rail to Kanding (V05 Danjin Beixin) →
2F	Side platform, doors open on the right
Street level	Entrance	Elevator, escalator, stairs

== Around the station ==
- Tamkang University
