= Binhai Shalun light rail station =

Light rail station in New Taipei, Taiwan

Coordinates: 25.1905°N 121.4317°E

Binhai Shalun V09 濱海沙崙站
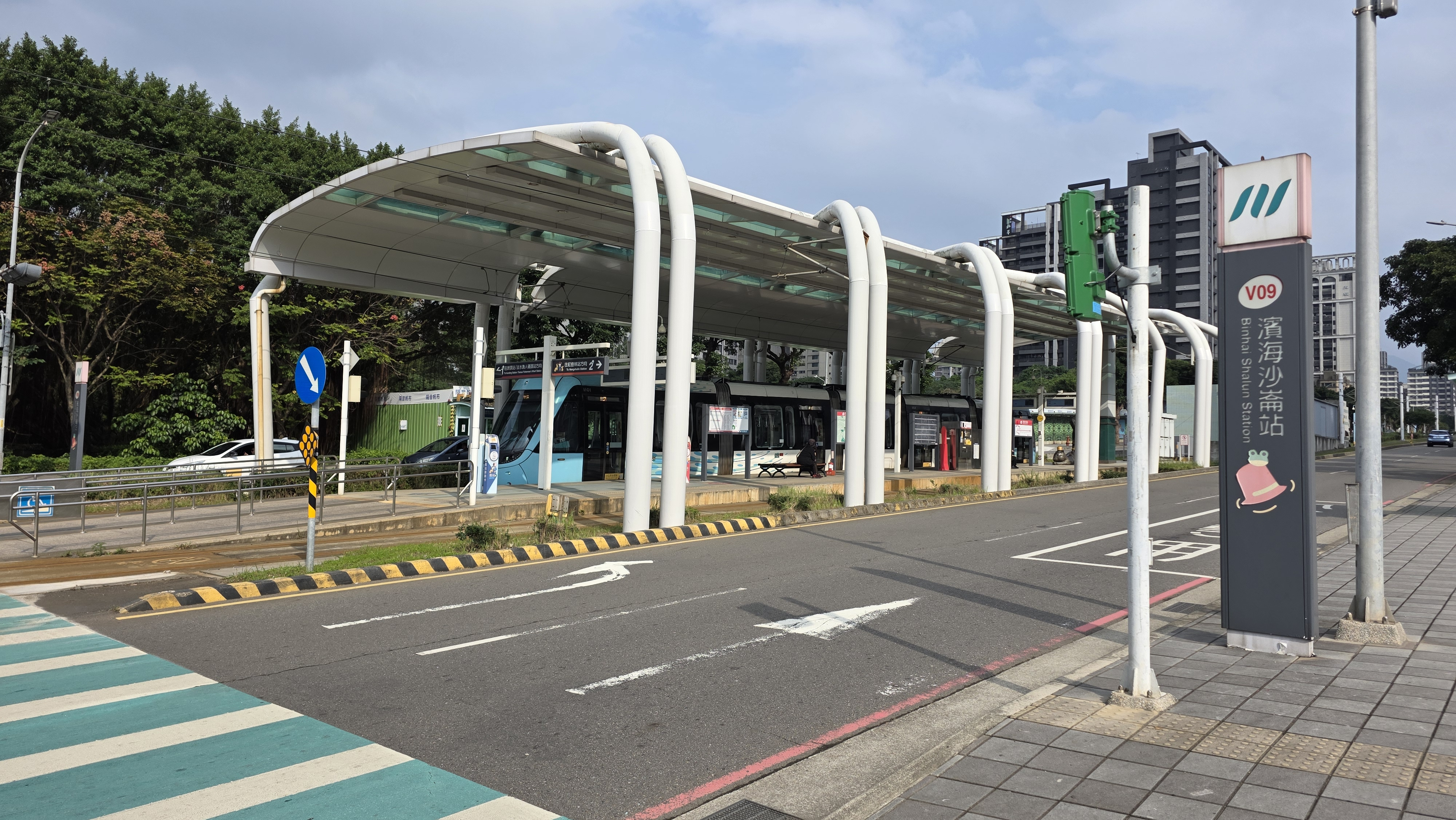
- Station exterior, January 7, 2026

General information
- Location: Tamsui, New Taipei; Taiwan
- Operator: New Taipei Metro
- Platforms: 2 side platforms
- Connections: Bus stop

Construction
- Structure type: At-grade
- Accessible: Yes

Other information
- Station code: V09

History
- Opened: 23 December 2018

Services
Preceding station	New Taipei Metro	Following station
Danhai New Town towards Kanding	Danhai LRT Green Mountain line	Binhai Yishan towards Hongshulin
Taipei University of Marine Technology towards Tamsui Fisherman's Wharf	Danhai LRT Blue Coast line	Binhai Yishan towards Hongshulin
Location

Binhai Shalun (Chinese: 濱海沙崙站; pinyin: Bīnhǎi Shālún Zhàn) is a light rail station of the Danhai light rail, which is operated by New Taipei Metro. It is located in Tamsui District, New Taipei, Taiwan.

== Station overview ==
This is an at-grade station with an island platform. It is located at Binhai Road Section 2 near its intersection with Shalun Road Section 1.

== Station layout ==
Street level
Street level	Platform 2	← Danhai light rail to Hongshulin (V08 Binhai Yishan)
Street level	Island platform, doors open on the left
Street level	Platform 1	→ Danhai light rail to Kanding (V10 Danhai New Town) → → Danhai light rail Blue Coast line to Tamsui Fisherman's Wharf (V28 Taipei University of Marine Technology) →
Street level	Entrance/exit

== Around the station ==
- Gongqi Nature Park
