= Danjin =

Danjin may refer to:

- Danjin Beixin light rail station, a station of Danhai light rail
- Danjin Denggong light rail station, a station of Danhai light rail
- Danjin Expressway (丹金高速), Chinese expressway, route of it is Danyang - Jintan in Jiangsu
- Lobzang Danjin (died 1731), Lha-bzang Khan's uncle.
