= Ganzhenlin light rail station =

Light rail station in New Taipei, Taiwan

Coordinates: 25.1624°N 121.4562°E

Ganzhenlin V02 竿蓁林站
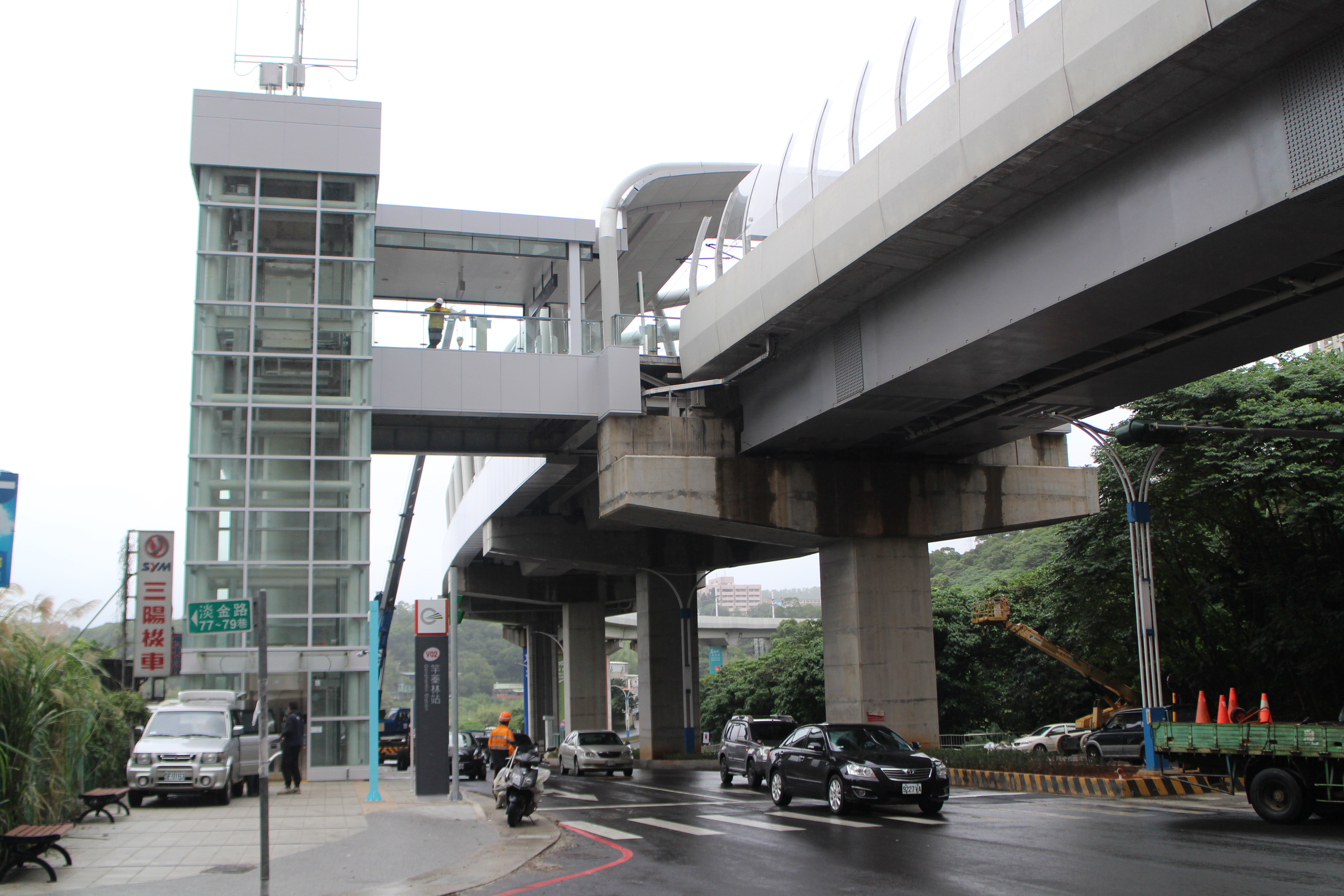
- Station exterior

General information
- Location: Tamsui, New Taipei; Taiwan
- Operated by: New Taipei Metro
- Platforms: 2 side platforms
- Connections: Bus stop

Construction
- Structure type: Elevated
- Accessible: Yes

Other information
- Station code: V02

History
- Opened: December 23, 2018

Services
Preceding station	New Taipei Metro	Following station
Danjin Denggong towards Kanding or Tamsui Fisherman's Wharf	Danhai light rail	Hongshulin Terminus

Ganzhenlin (Chinese: 竿蓁林站; pinyin: Gānzhēnlīn) is a light rail station of the Danhai light rail, which is operated by New Taipei Metro. It is located in Tamsui District, New Taipei, Taiwan.

== Station overview ==
The station is an elevated station with two side platforms. It is located above Provincial Highway 2 near its intersection with District Highway 2 (Pingding Road).

== Station layout ==
Second floor	Side platform, doors open on the right
Second floor	Platform 2	← Danhai light rail to Hongshulin (V01 Terminus)
Second floor	Platform 1	→ Danhai light rail to Kanding (V03 Danjin Denggong) →
Second floor	Side platform, doors open on the right
Ground level	Entrance	Elevator, escalator, stairs
