= Binhai Yishan light rail station =

Light rail station in New Taipei, Taiwan

Coordinates: 25.1892°N 121.4374°E

Binhai Yishan V08 濱海義山站
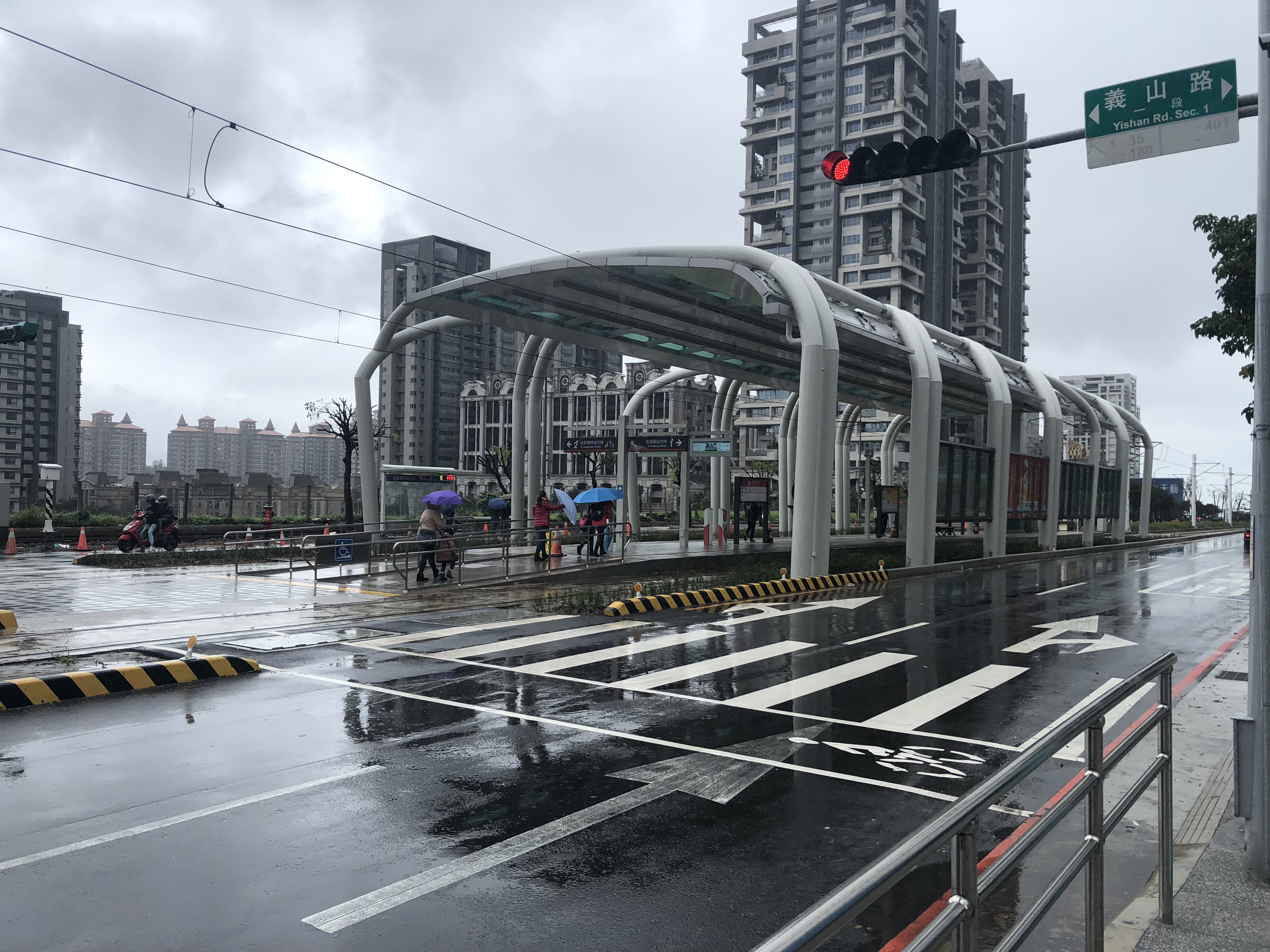
- Station exterior

General information
- Location: Tamsui, New Taipei; Taiwan
- Operated by: New Taipei Metro
- Platforms: 2 side platforms
- Connections: Bus stop

Construction
- Structure type: At-grade
- Accessible: Yes

Other information
- Station code: V08

History
- Opened: 23 December 2018

Services
Preceding station	New Taipei Metro	Following station
Binhai Shalun towards Kanding or Tamsui Fisherman's Wharf	Danhai LRT	Tamsui District Office towards Hongshulin
Location

Binhai Yishan (Chinese: 濱海義山站; pinyin: Bīnhǎi Yìshān Zhàn) is a light rail station of the Danhai light rail, which is operated by New Taipei Metro. It is located in Tamsui District, New Taipei, Taiwan.

== Station overview ==
This is an at-grade station with an island platform. It is located at Binhai Road Section 2 near its intersection with Yishan Road Section 1.

== Station layout ==
Street level
Street level	Platform 2	← Danhai light rail to Hongshulin (V07 Tamsui District Office)
Street level	Island platform, doors open on the left
Street level	Platform 1	→ Danhai light rail to Kanding (V09 Binhai Shalun) →
Street level	Entrance/exit
