= Tamsui Fisherman's Wharf =

Wharf in Tamsui, New Taipei, Taiwan

Tamsui Fisherman's Wharf 淡水漁人碼頭
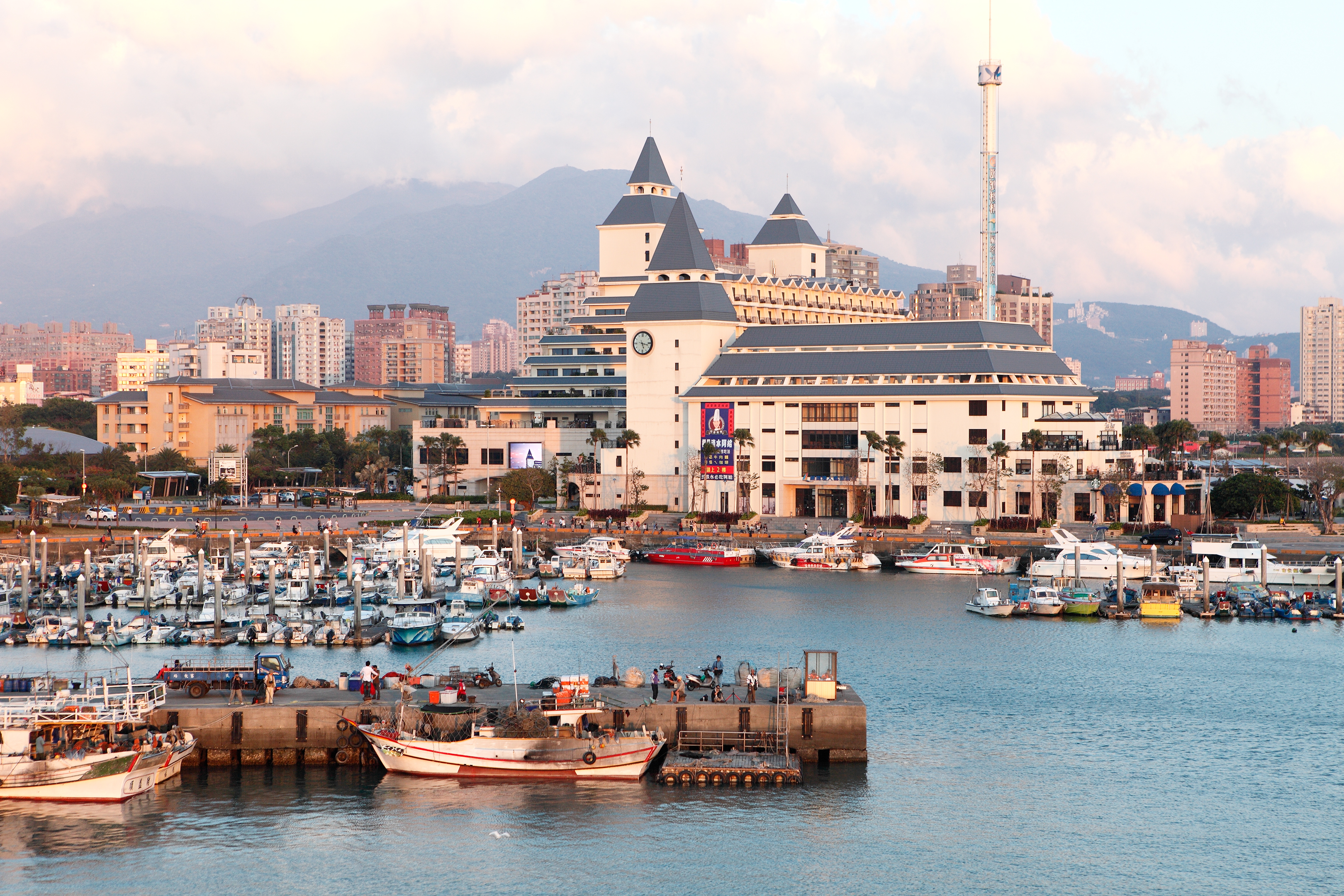
- Interactive map of Tamsui Fisherman's Wharf 淡水漁人碼頭
- Location within Taiwan

Location
- Location: Tamsui, New Taipei, Taiwan
- Coordinates: 25°10′58.9″N 121°24′38″E

Details
- Type of Harbor: Wharf

The Tamsui Fisherman's Wharf (traditional Chinese: 淡水漁人碼頭; simplified Chinese: 淡水渔人码头; pinyin: Dànshuǐ Yúrén Mǎtóu), officially the Tamsui Second Fishing Harbor (Chinese: 淡水第二漁港; pinyin: Dànshuǐ Dìèr Yúgǎng), is a major fishing harbor and a scenic spot on the right bank of the Tamsui River estuary, at the western tip of Tamsui District, New Taipei City, Taiwan. The predecessor was the Tamsui Customs Wharf, a more inland but important fishing harbor in the early history of north Taiwan.

== Facilities ==
- Tamsui Lover's Bridge: Lover Bridge of Tamsui, a white-colored Cable-stayed bridge, derived its name since it was opened on 14 February 2003, Valentine's Day. You may appreciate the sunset from the bridge. The total length is approximately 196 meters and the walk across takes approximately 3 minutes.
- Outdoor Lawn and Sculpture Park
- Fluctuation Fishing Boat Wharf: with anchorage for up to 150 fishing boats.
- Riverbanks Scenery Platform: maximum capacity of 3,000 people with views of the Tamsui river and Kuanyinshan.

== Transportation ==
- Take the Taipei Metro Tamsui Line to Tamsui Station, and then transfer to Bus Red-26, 836, or 837.
- Tamsui Fisherman's Wharf Station of the Danhai light rail.
- Danjiang Bridge

== See also ==
- List of tourist attractions in Taiwan
- Port of Taipei
