= Danjin Denggong light rail station =

Light rail station in New Taipei, Taiwan

Coordinates: 25.1692°N 121.4608°E

Danjin Denggong V03 淡金鄧公站
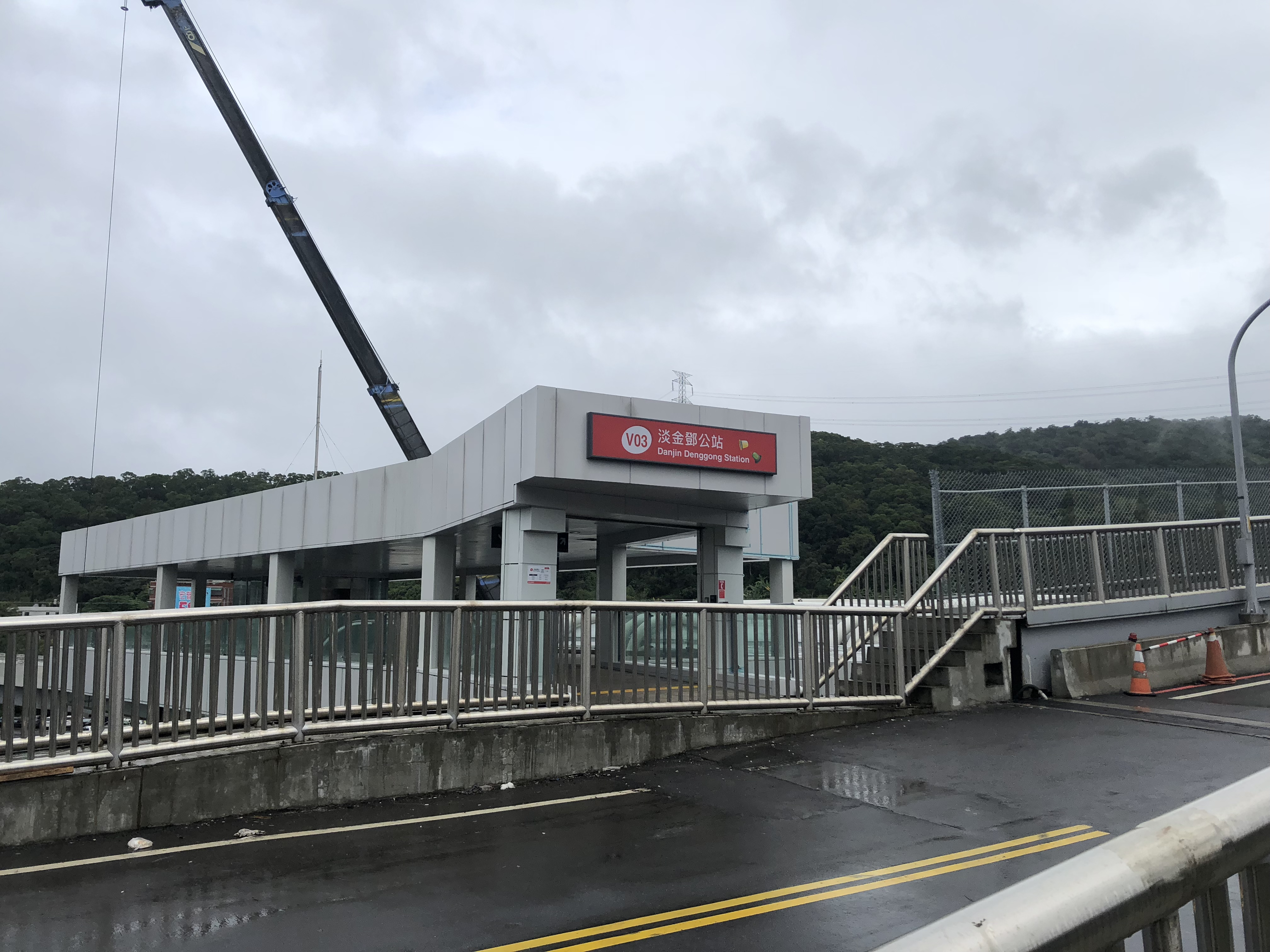
- Entrance from Denggong Road

General information
- Location: Tamsui, New Taipei; Taiwan
- Operated by: New Taipei Metro
- Platforms: 2 side platforms
- Connections: Bus stop

Construction
- Structure type: Elevated
- Accessible: Yes

Other information
- Station code: V03

History
- Opened: December 23, 2018

Services
Preceding station	New Taipei Metro	Following station
Tamkang University towards Kanding or Tamsui Fisherman's Wharf	Danhai LRT	Ganzhenlin towards Hongshulin
Location

Danjin Denggong (Chinese: 淡金鄧公站; pinyin: Dànjīn Dènggōng Zhàn) is a light rail station of the Danhai light rail, which is operated by New Taipei Metro. It is located in Tamsui District, New Taipei, Taiwan.

== Station overview ==
The station is an elevated station with two side platforms. It is located above Provincial Highway 2 near its intersection with District Highway 4 (Denggong Road).

== Station layout ==
3F	Entrance/exit (Denggong Rd.)	Connecting passageway, elevator
2F	Side platform, doors open on the right
2F	Platform 2	← Danhai light rail to Hongshulin (V02 Ganzhenlin)
2F	Platform 1	→ Danhai light rail to Kanding (V04 Tankang University) →
2F	Side platform, doors open on the right
Street level	Entrance/exit (Danjin Rd.)	Escalators, elevators, stairs
