= Tamsui District Office light rail station =

Light rail station in New Taipei, Taiwan

Coordinates: 25.1890°N 121.4445°E

Tamsui District Office V07 淡水行政中心站
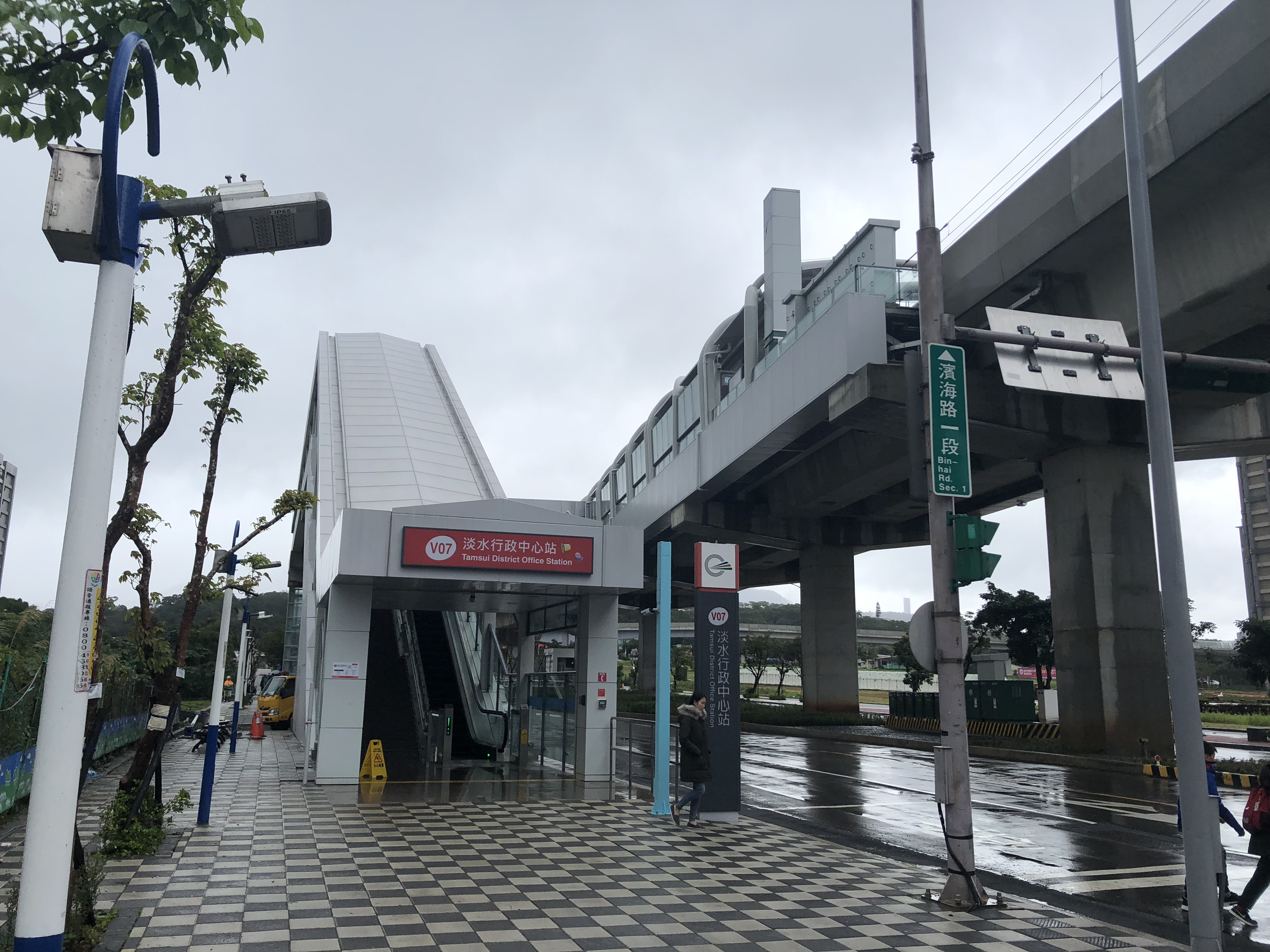
- Station entrance

General information
- Location: Tamsui, New Taipei; Taiwan
- Operated by: New Taipei Metro
- Platforms: 2 side platforms
- Connections: Bus stop

Construction
- Structure type: Elevated
- Accessible: Yes

Other information
- Station code: V07

History
- Opened: 23 December 2018

Services
| Preceding station | New Taipei Metro | Following station |
|---|---|---|
| Binhai Yishan towards Kanding or Tamsui Fisherman's Wharf | Danhai light rail | Xinshi 1st Rd towards Hongshulin |

Tamsui District Office (Chinese: 淡水行政中心站; pinyin: Dànshuǐ Xíngzhèng Zhōngxīn Zhàn) is a light rail station of the Danhai light rail, which is operated by New Taipei Metro. It is located in Tamsui District, New Taipei, Taiwan.

== Station overview ==
The station is an elevated station with two side platforms. It is located above Binhai Road Section 1 near its intersection with District Road 1 (Zhongshan North Road Section 2).

== Station layout ==
| 2F | Side platform, doors open on the right |
| 2F | Platform 2 | ← Danhai light rail to Hongshulin (V06 Xinshi 1st Rd) |
| 2F | Platform 1 | → Danhai light rail to Kanding (V08 Binhai Yishan) → |
| 2F | Side platform, doors open on the right |
| Street level | Entrance | Elevator, escalator, stairs |

== Around the station ==
- Tamsui District Office
- Tamsui National Sports Center
