= Beixin =

Beixin may refer to:

- Beixin, a kind of Chinese sleeveless vest
- Beixin culture, a Neolithic culture in Shandong, China

== See also ==
- Danjin Beixin light rail station, a station of Danhai light rail
