= Zhuwei metro station =

Metro station in New Taipei, Taiwan

Coordinates: 25.137°N 121.459501°E

Zhuwei 竹圍
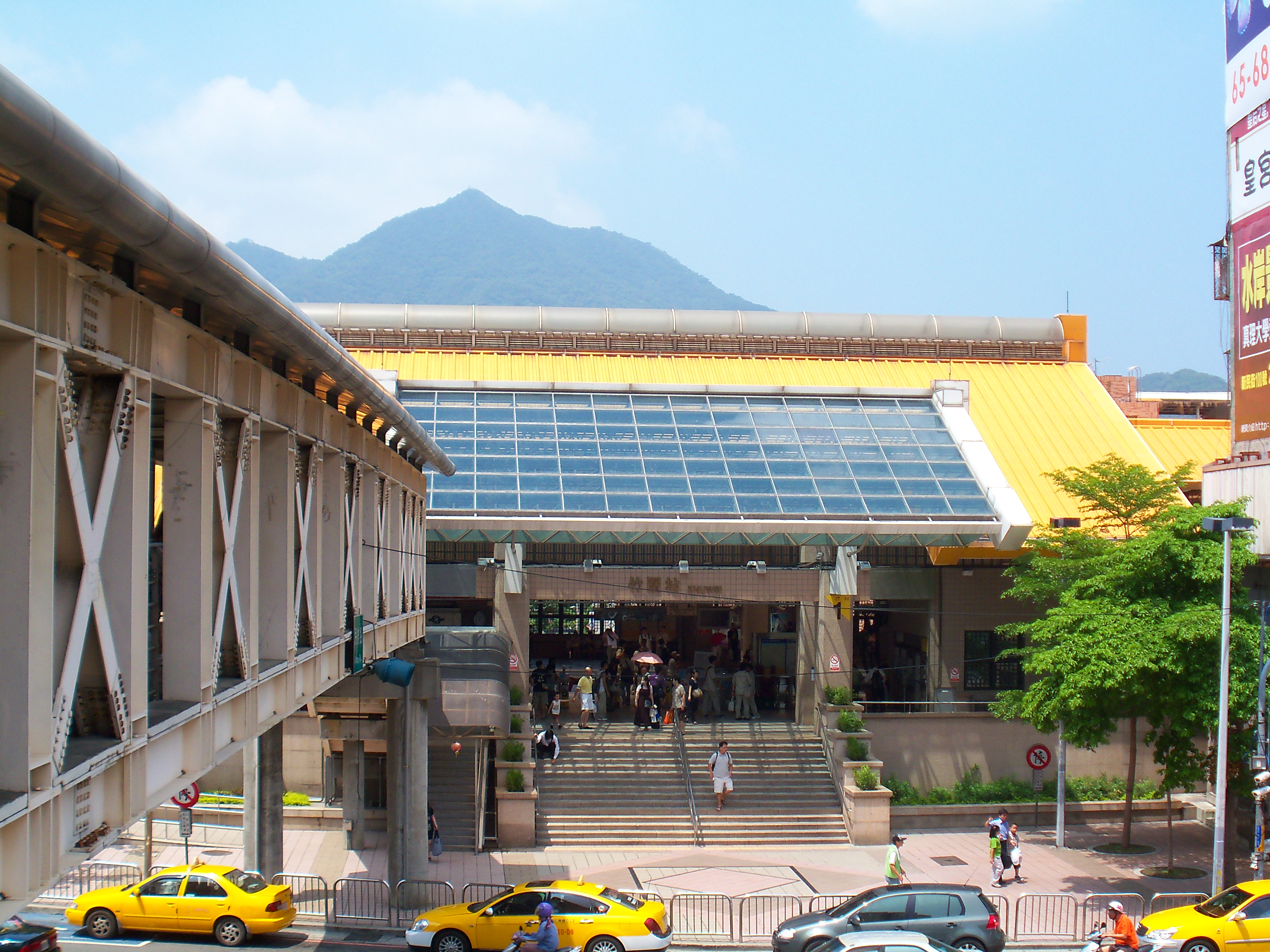
- Zhuwei Station

Chinese name
- Traditional Chinese: 竹圍
- Simplified Chinese: 竹围
- Literal meaning: Bamboo enclosure
Transcriptions
Standard Mandarin
- Hanyu Pinyin: Zhúwéi
- Bopomofo: ㄓㄨˊ ㄨㄟˊ
- Wade–Giles: Chu²-wei²
Hakka
- Pha̍k-fa-sṳ: Chuk-vì

Alternative Chinese name
- Traditional Chinese: 竹圍仔
- Simplified Chinese: 竹围仔
Transcriptions
Southern Min
- Tâi-lô: Tik-uî-á

General information
- Location: No. 50, Minquan Road; Tamsui, New Taipei; Taiwan
- Operator: Taipei Metro
- Line: Tamsui–Xinyi line
- Connections: Bus stop

Construction
- Structure type: At-Grade

Other information
- Station code: R26

History
- Opened: March 28, 1997

Passengers
- daily (December 2024)
- Rank: 76 out of 109

Services
Preceding station	Taipei Metro	Following station
Guandu towards Xiangshan	Tamsui–Xinyi line	Hongshulin towards Tamsui
Location

The Taipei Metro Zhuwei station (formerly transliterated as Chuwei Station until 2003) is located in the sea-side district of Tamsui in New Taipei, Taiwan. It is a station on the Tamsui–Xinyi line. The position of the station could be traced back the same name station of defunct TRA Tamsui line.

== Station overview ==
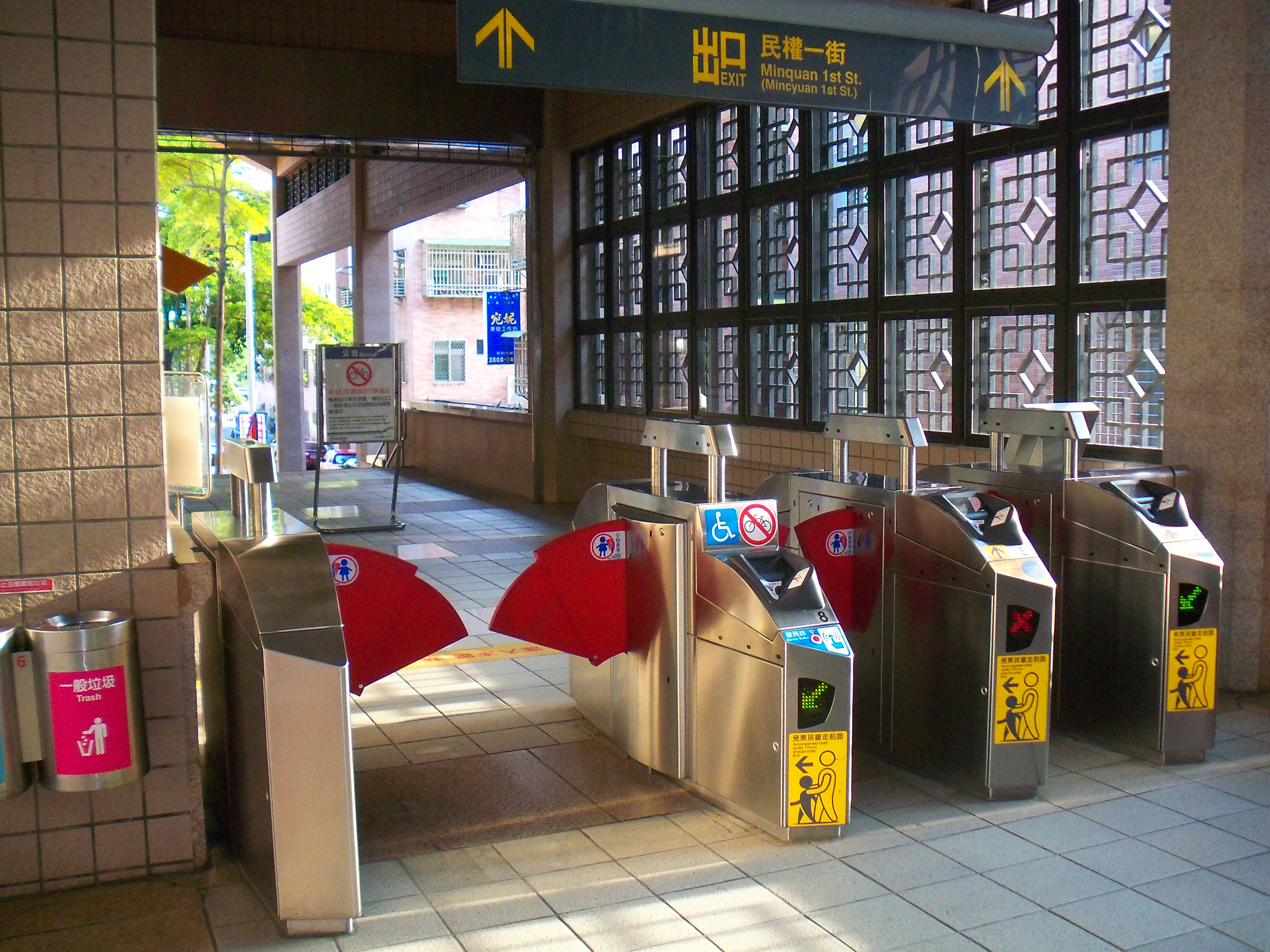
Faregates at Exit 2

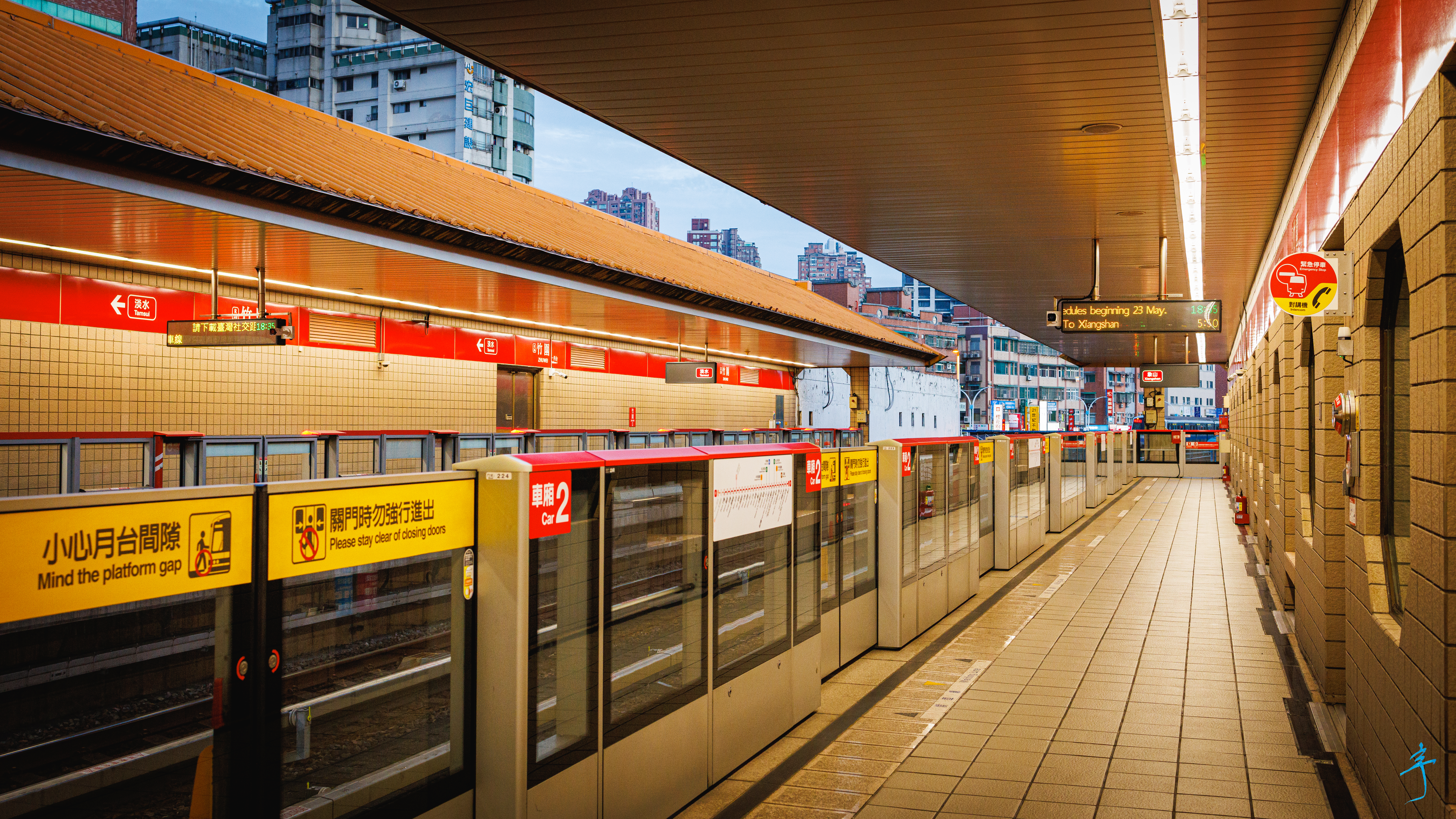
Platform

This at-grade station structure has two side platforms and two exits.

== History ==
The station was constructed in 1932 as Chikuwi station (Japanese: 竹圍乘降場), and was closed on August 15, 1988. It was reopened on March 28, 1997.

== Station layout ==
2F	Connecting level	Skyway for platform connection
Street level
Street level	Concourse (toward Platform 1)
Street level	Concourse (toward Platform 1)	Entrance/exit, lobby, information desk, automatic ticket dispensing machines, one-way faregates Restrooms
Street level	Side platform, doors will open on the right
Street level	Platform 1	← Tamsui–Xinyi line toward Tamsui (R27 Hongshulin)
Street level	Platform 2	→ Tamsui–Xinyi line toward Xiangshan (R25 Guandu) →
Street level	Side platform, doors will open on the right

== First and last train timings ==
The first and last train timings at Zhuwei station are as follows:

Destination	First train		Last train
Destination	Mon − Fri	Sat − Sun and P.H.	Daily
Tamsui–Xinyi line
R28 Tamsui	06:07	06:07	01:10
R01 guangci/fengtian palace station	06:05	06:05	00:06
