= Danhai New Town light rail station =

Light rail station in New Taipei, Taiwan

Coordinates: 25.1957°N 121.4325°E

Danhai New Town V10 淡海新市鎮站
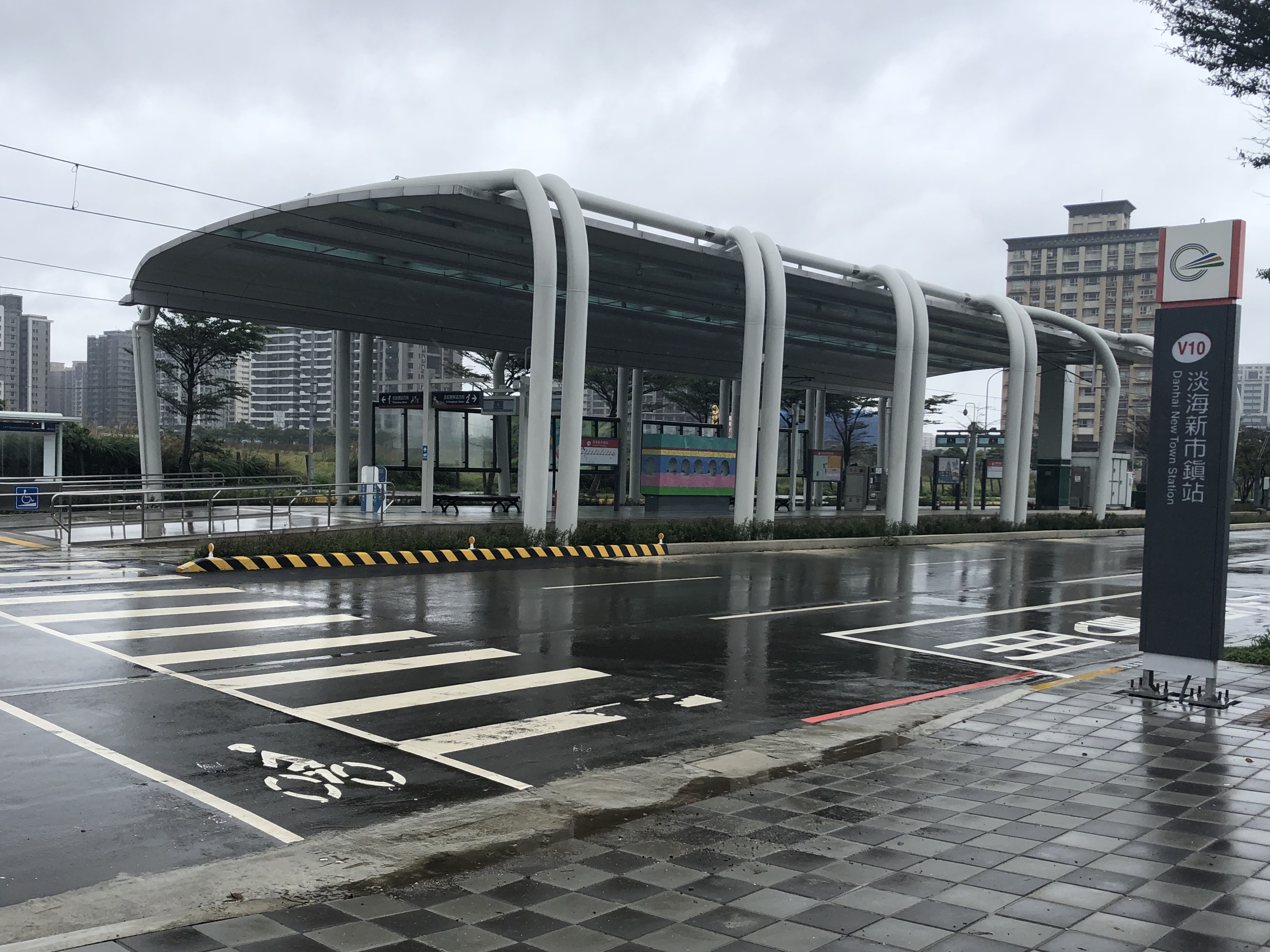
- Station exterior

General information
- Location: Tamsui, New Taipei; Taiwan
- Operated by: New Taipei Metro
- Platforms: 2 side platforms
- Connections: Bus stop

Construction
- Structure type: At-grade
- Accessible: Yes

Other information
- Station code: V10

History
- Opened: December 23, 2018

Services
Preceding station	New Taipei Metro	Following station
Kanding Terminus	Danhai LRT Green Mountain line	Binhai Shalun towards Hongshulin
Location

Danhai New Town (Chinese: 淡海新市鎮站; pinyin: Dànhǎi Xīnshìzhèn Zhàn) is a light rail station of the Danhai light rail, which is operated by New Taipei Metro. It is located in Tamsui District, New Taipei, Taiwan.

== Station overview ==
This is an at-grade station with an island platform. It is located at Shalun Road Section 2 near its intersection with Xinshi 3rd Road Section 2.

== Station layout ==
Street level
Street level	Platform 2	← Danhai light rail to Hongshulin (V09 Binhai Shalun)
Street level	Island platform, doors open on the left
Street level	Platform 1	→ Danhai light rail to Kanding (V11 Terminus) →
Street level	Entrance/exit

== Around the station ==
- Danhai New Town
