= V28 =

V28, or V.28, may refer to:

- CX3C motif chemokine receptor 1
- Fokker V.28, a German World War I fighter aircraft prototype
- ITU-T V.28, a modem standard
- SMS V28, a torpedo boat of the Imperial German Navy
- Taipei University of Marine Technology light rail station
- Wick (hieroglyph), an Egyptian hieroglyph
