= Taipei University of Marine Technology light rail station =

Light rail station in Taiwan

Taipei University of Marine Technology V28 台北海洋大學

General information
- Location: Taiwan
- Coordinates: 25°11′28″N 121°25′35″E
- Elevation: At-grade
- Operator: New Taipei Metro
- Line: Danhai Light Rail
- Platforms: 2 (2 side platforms)
- Connections: Bus

Construction
- Structure type: At-grade
- Accessible: Yes

Other information
- Station code: V28

History
- Opened: November 15, 2020

Services
Preceding station	New Taipei Metro	Following station
Shalun towards Tamsui Fisherman's Wharf	Danhai LRT Blue Coast line	Binhai Shalun towards Hongshulin
Location

Taipei University of Marine Technology (Chinese: 台北海洋大學) is a light rail station on the Danhai light rail, which is operated by the New Taipei Metro. It is located at the Tamsui District, New Taipei, Taiwan.

== Station overview ==
This is an at-grade station with two side platforms. It is located at Section 3, Binhai Rd, and as the name suggests, is located near the Taipei University of Marine Technology. It is part of the Blue Coast Line on the Danhai light rail, with its terminus being V26 Tamsui Fisherman's Wharf.

== Station layout ==
Street level	Side platform, doors open on the right
Street level	Platform 2	→ Danhai light rail to Tamsui Fisherman's Wharf (V27 Shalun) →
Street level	Platform 1	← Danhai light rail to Hongshulin (V09 Binhai Shalun)
Street level	Side platform, doors open on the right
Street level	Entrance/exit

== Around the station ==
- Taipei University of Marine Technology
- Shalun Night Market

== History ==
Construction of the station started on August 18, 2014, and it opened on November 15, 2020.
