= V27 =

V27, or similar, may refer to:

- Fokker V.27, a German fighter aircraft prototype
- ITU-T V.27, a modem standard
- Shalun light rail station, in New Taipei, Taiwan
- SMS V27, a torpedo boat of the Imperial German Navy
