= Danjin Beixin light rail station =

Light rail station in New Taipei, Taiwan

Danjin Beixin V05 淡金北新站
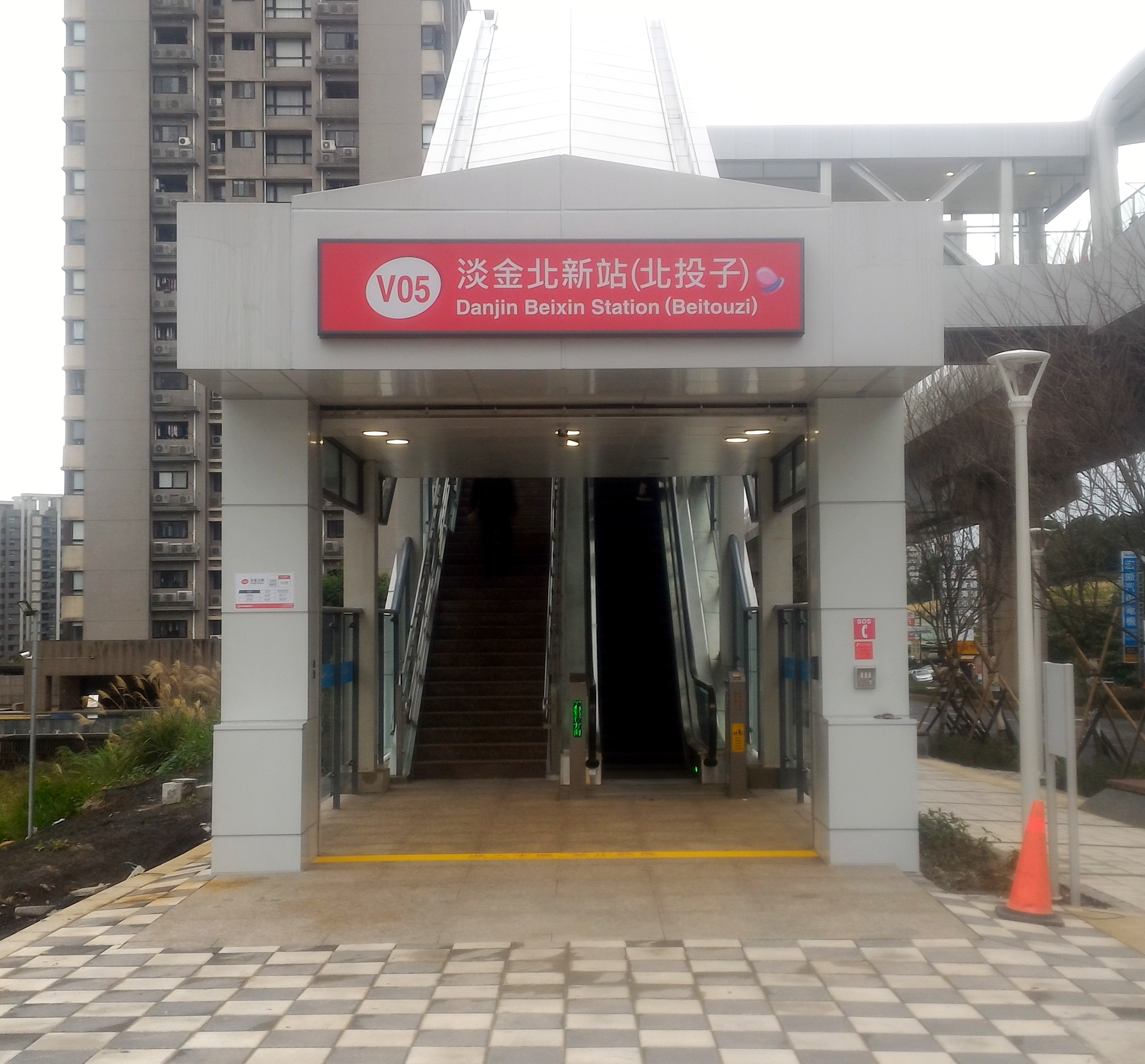

General information
- Other names: Beitouzi (北投子)
- Location: Tamsui, New Taipei; Taiwan
- Coordinates: 25°11′1″N 121°27′2″E
- Operated by: New Taipei Metro
- Line: Danhai light rail
- Platforms: 2 side platforms
- Connections: Bus stop

Construction
- Structure type: Elevated

Other information
- Station code: V05

History
- Opened: 23 December 2018; 7 years ago

Services
Preceding station	New Taipei Metro	Following station
Xinshi 1st Rd towards Kanding or Tamsui Fisherman's Wharf	Danhai LRT	Tamkang University towards Hongshulin
Location

Danjin Beixin light rail station
- Traditional Chinese: 淡金北新站
- Simplified Chinese: 淡金北新站
Transcriptions
Standard Mandarin
- Hanyu Pinyin: Dànjīn-Běixīn-Zhàn
- Bopomofo: ㄉㄢˋ ㄐㄧㄣ ㄅㄟˇ ㄒㄧㄣ ㄓㄢˋ
- Wade–Giles: Tan^{4}-chin^{1}-Pei^{3}-hsin^{1}-Chan^{4}
- Tongyong Pinyin: Dànjin-Běisin-Jhàn

Danjin Beixin station (淡金北新站) is a station of Danhai light rail, which is located at Tamsui District, New Taipei, Taiwan.

== Station overview ==
The station building consists of three elevated floors and is constructed above Tamsui-Jinshan highway (淡金公路). It has two side platforms, and only one exit. As its name suggests, the station is located near the intersection of Danjin Rd. (Tamsui-Jinshan highway) and Beixin Rd. It was opened on December 23, 2018, when the Danhai light rail began operation.

== Station design ==
This is an elevated station with two side platforms.

== Station layout ==
2F	Side platform, doors open on the right
2F	Platform 2	← Danhai light rail to Hongshulin (V04 Tamkang University)
2F	Platform 1	→ Danhai light rail to Kanding (V06 Xinshi 1st Rd) →
2F	Side platform, doors open on the right
Street level	Entrance	Elevator, escalator, stairs

== Around the station ==
- Tamkang University
- Danshui Qingge Community
- Zheng De Junior High School
