= Shalun light rail station =

Light rail station in New Taipei, Taiwan

Shalun V27 沙崙站
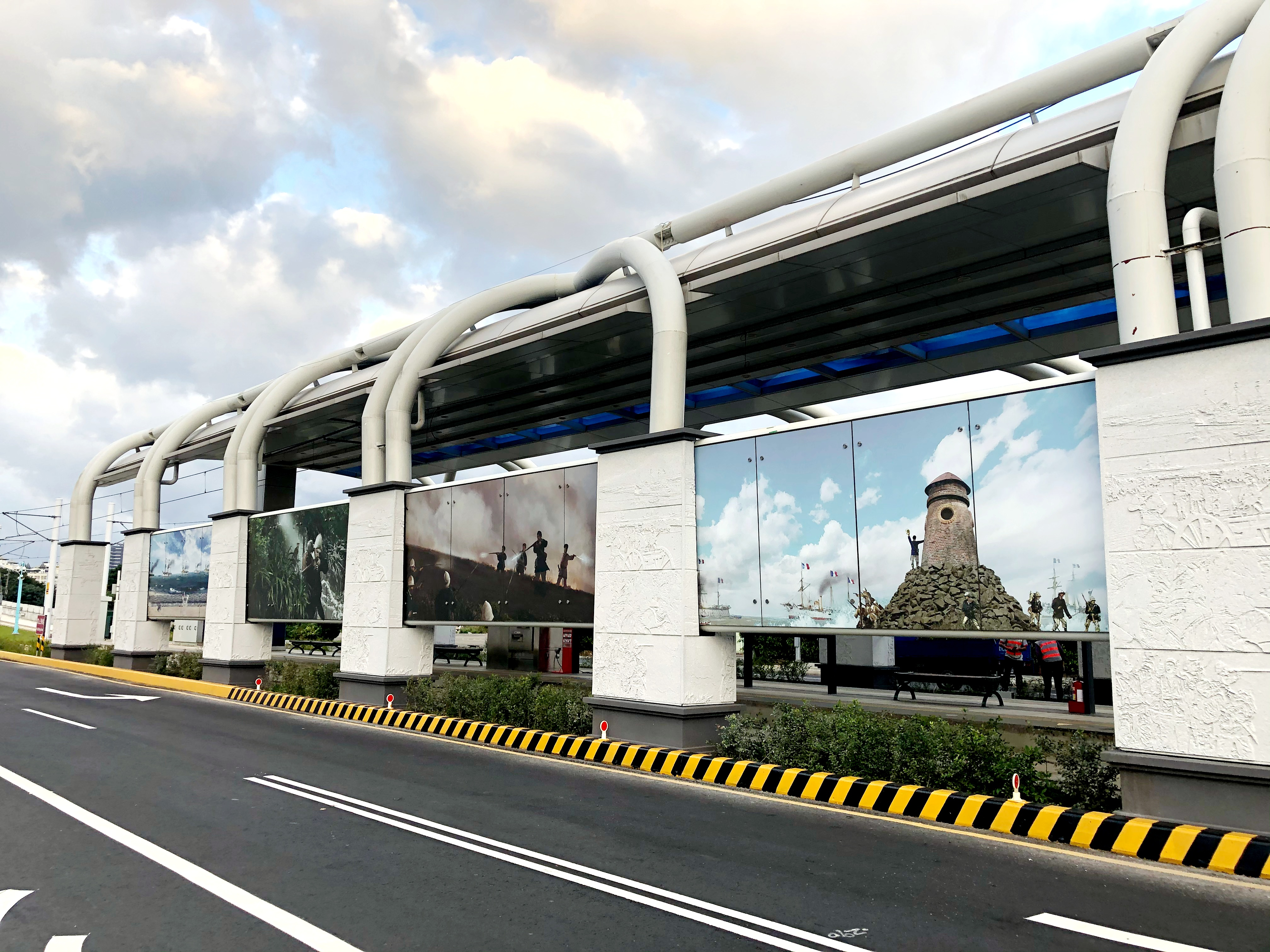

General information
- Location: Tamsui, New Taipei; Taiwan
- Coordinates: 25.1875°N 121.4173°E
- Operator: New Taipei Metro
- Platforms: Island platform
- Connections: Bus stop

Construction
- Structure type: At-grade
- Accessible: Yes

Other information
- Station code: V27

History
- Opened: 15 November 2020

Services
Preceding station	New Taipei Metro	Following station
Tamsui Fisherman's Wharf Terminus	Danhai LRT Blue Coast line	Taipei University of Marine Technology towards Hongshulin
Location

Shalun (Chinese: 沙崙站; pinyin: Shā lún zhàn) is a light rail station on the Blue Ocean line of the Danhai light rail, operated by the New Taipei Metro, in Tamsui, New Taipei, Taiwan.

== Station overview ==
This is an at-grade station with an island platform. It is located near the intersection of Danhai Road and Guanhai Road.

== Station layout ==
Street level
Street level	Platform 1	← Danhai light rail to Tamsui Fisherman's Wharf (V26 terminus)
Street level	Island platform, doors open on the left
Street level	Platform 2	→ Danhai light rail to Hongshulin (V28 Taipei University of Marine Technology) →
Street level	Entrance/exit

== Around the station ==
- Shalun Beach
- Radio Taiwan International Tamsui Branch
- Luye Equestrian Center

== Construction ==
Construction of the station started on August 18, 2014, and it was opened on November 15, 2020.
