= Danhai LRT =

Light rail transit system in Taiwan

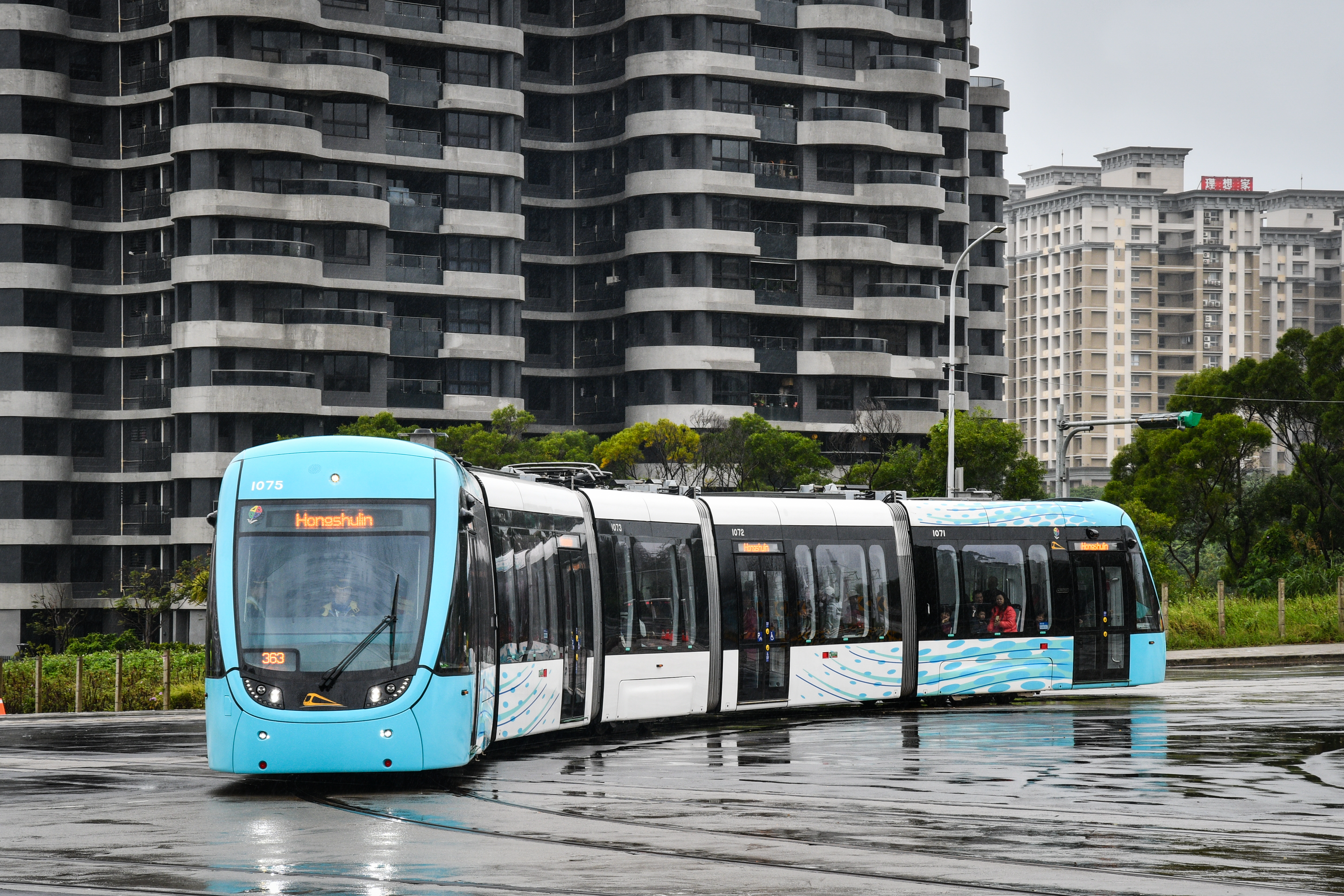
- Danhai LRT tram in 2024

Overview
- Native name: 淡海輕軌
- Status: In service (Note: Tamsui Fisherman's Wharf–Tamsui section still in planning)
- Owner: Department of Rapid Transit Systems
- Line number: V
- Locale: Tamsui, New Taipei, Taiwan
- Termini: Kanding or Tamsui Fisherman's Wharf; Hongshulin
- Stations: 14
- Color on map: Vermilion

Service
- Type: Light rail
- System: New Taipei Metro
- Services: Kanding–Hongshulin; Tamsui Fisherman's Wharf–Hongshulin
- Operator: New Taipei Metro Co
- Depot: Danhai Depot
- Rolling stock: Danhai LRV

History
- Opened: 23 December 2018; 21 November 2020 (Blue Coast Line); 2024 (extension to Tamsui)

Technical
- Line length: 7.3 km (4.5 mi)
- Character: Ground level, elevated
- Track gauge: 1,435 mm (4 ft 8 1/2 in) standard gauge
- Electrification: 750 V DC overhead line
- Operating speed: 70 km/h (43 mph) (with electric cable), 50 km/h (31 mph) (without electric cable)

Danhai LRT
- Traditional Chinese: 淡海輕軌
- Simplified Chinese: 淡海轻轨
Transcriptions
Standard Mandarin
- Hanyu Pinyin: Dànhǎi Qīngguǐ
- Bopomofo: ㄉㄢˋ ㄏㄞˇ ㄑㄧㄥ ㄍㄨㄟˇ
- Wade–Giles: Tan^{4}-hai^{3} Ch‘ing^{1}-kui^{3}
- Tongyong Pinyin: Dànhǎi Cingguěi
- IPA: [tân.xàɪ tɕʰíŋ.kwěɪ]
Yue: Cantonese
- Yale Romanization: Daahmhói Hīnggwái
- Jyutping: daam6 hoi2 hing1 gwai2
- IPA: [tam˨.hɔj˧˥ hɪŋ˥.kʷɐj˧˥]
Southern Min
- Hokkien POJ: Tām-hái Khin-kúi

The Danhai LRT (Chinese: 淡海輕軌; code V) is a light rail transit (LRT) line in Tamsui District, New Taipei City, Taiwan, operated by New Taipei Metro. It opened on 23 December 2018 and began service the following day.

== History ==
The system is built to provide public transportation to Danhai New Town, whose population is expected to reach 340,000 by 2041.

The initial feasibility study for a heavy-capacity extension line of the Taipei Metro was completed in 1992. Further planning reports were completed in 1998 and 1999. At that time the project was put on hold due to budgetary considerations. In 2005, planning shifted from a metro system to a light rail system. A light rail feasibility study was completed in 2007, with a review of funding and operation throughout 2008. The study was completed and presented for approval to the Executive Yuan in 2010.

The light rail two-stage construction plan by the Ministry of Transportation and Communications was approved by Council for Economic Planning and Development on 7 January 2013. The first phase of the construction began in September 2014.

The system is projected to carry 120,000 passengers per day.

== Route ==
Route Map

The system currently consists of 14 stations, with 6 additional stations planned. Tracks are at ground level and elevated. The total length will be 13.99 kilometres (8.69 mi).

The Hongshulin–Kanding section opened in December 2018. Trains run from Hongshulin Station northward and turn west along Zhongzheng East Road, Highway No. 2, Binhai Road and Shalun Road. Seven of its eleven stations are elevated, with the remaining four at ground level. The bike sharing service YouBike is available at seven stations.

A two-kilometre (1.2 mi) branch with three stations opened in November 2020. The branch runs from Tamsui Fisherman's Wharf, turns eastward to join the Kanding branch, with which it shares 1.21 kilometres (0.75 mi) and three stops. The line follows Highway No. 2B, Binhai Road, and Shalun Road. All nine stations will be at ground level.

== Stations ==
Code	Station name	Station type		Locale		Sta. distance (km)		Opened date	Transfer
Code	Station name	Structure	Platform	Locale		Previous	Total	Opened date	Transfer
Danhai LRT; Green Mountain Line (Hongshulin—Binhai Shalun—Kanding)
V01	Hongshulin 紅樹林	Elevated	Island	Tamsui	New Taipei	—N/a	0.000	2018-12-24	Tamsui–Xinyi Line
V02	Ganzhenlin 竿蓁林	Elevated	Side	Tamsui	New Taipei	0.840	0.840	2018-12-24	—N/a
V03	Danjin Denggong 淡金鄧公	Elevated	Side	Tamsui	New Taipei	0.945	1.785	2018-12-24	—N/a
V04	Tamkang University 淡江大學	Elevated	Side	Tamsui	New Taipei	0.960	2.745	2018-12-24	—N/a
V05	Danjin Beixin 淡金北新	Elevated	Side	Tamsui	New Taipei	0.600	3.345	2018-12-24	—N/a
V06	Xinshi 1st Rd 新市一路	Elevated	Side	Tamsui	New Taipei	0.505	3.850	2018-12-24	—N/a
V07	Tamsui District Office 淡水行政中心	Elevated	Side	Tamsui	New Taipei	0.705	4.555	2018-12-24	—N/a
V08	Binhai Yishan 濱海義山	Ground	Island	Tamsui	New Taipei	0.870	5.425	2018-12-24	—N/a
V09	Binhai Shalun 濱海沙崙	Ground	Island	Tamsui	New Taipei	0.560	5.985	2018-12-24	For Tamsui Fisherman's Wharf
V10	Danhai New Town 淡海新市鎮	Ground	Island	Tamsui	New Taipei	0.795	6.780	2018-12-24	—N/a
V11	Kanding 崁頂	Ground	Island	Tamsui	New Taipei	0.500	7.280	2018-12-24	—N/a
Danhai LRT; Blue Coast Line (Binhai Shalun—Tamsui Fisherman's Wharf—Tamsui)
V09	Binhai Shalun 濱海沙崙	Ground	Island	Tamsui	New Taipei	—N/a	0.000	2018-12-24	For Kanding
V28	Taipei University of Marine Technology 臺北海洋大學	Ground	Side	Tamsui	New Taipei	0.530	0.530	2020-11-15	—N/a
V27	Shalun 沙崙	Ground	Island	Tamsui	New Taipei	1.125	1.655	2020-11-15	—N/a
V26	Tamsui Fisherman's Wharf 淡水漁人碼頭	Ground	Island	Tamsui	New Taipei	0.705	2.360	2020-11-15	—N/a
V25	Unreleased	Ground	Unreleased	Tamsui	New Taipei	Unreleased		Planning	—N/a
V24	Unreleased	Ground	Unreleased	Tamsui	New Taipei	Unreleased		Planning	—N/a
V23	Unreleased	Ground	Unreleased	Tamsui	New Taipei	Unreleased		Planning	—N/a
V22	Unreleased	Ground	Unreleased	Tamsui	New Taipei	Unreleased		Planning	—N/a
V21	Tamsui 淡水	Ground	Unreleased	Tamsui	New Taipei	Unreleased		Planning	Tamsui–Xinyi Line

== Rolling stock ==
The cars were built in Taiwan by the Taiwan Rolling Stock Company under the first program to domestically build light rail vehicles. The company partnered with Voith Engineering Services on the design of the cars. Final assembly and the manufacturing of many components were done in Taiwan. Through this project, Taiwan seeks to lessen its dependence on foreign manufacturers for rail systems.

Each of the 15 bi-directional standard gauge trams is 34.5 metres (113 ft) long and can carry up to 265 passengers. They are designed with electrical onboard storage capacity so that they can travel short distances under their power; this allows simplification of the overhead power cabling by eliminating the need to run the power cables across major intersections. The prototype was scheduled to be ready in 2016, with all 15 cars to be delivered by the end of 2017.

== Budget ==
The light rail was expected to cost NT$15.31 billion, of which NT$1.67 billion was to be provided by the central government, NT$7.09 billion by Construction and Planning Agency and NT$6.55 billion by New Taipei City Government when it was approved in 2013. The current estimate is NT$31.357 billion.

== Construction ==
The project is divided into two phases. The first phase is the 11-station Green Mountain Line and part of the Blue Coast Line comprising three stations, totaling 9.7 kilometres (6.0 mi) and the depot. The whole first phase costs NT$12.8 billion. Work began in September 2014 and as of May 2016 is approximately one-third complete. With the opening of the Green Mountain Line, the first phase of the Danhai LRT is almost completed. The other three stations along the Blue Coast Line will be completed later.

The second phase completes the remaining 4.4 kilometres (2.7 mi) and six more stations of the Blue Coast Line. Its planned completion is in 2024.

The line is being developed by China Steel Corporation and subsidiaries United Steel Engineering & Construction Corporation and Taiwan Rolling Stock Company. Other contractors are Thales Rail Signalling Solutions for signalling, communications, and control equipment; CTCI Corporation for track work; Pandrol for track, maintenance, and safety equipment; TÜV Rheinland for testing; and ABB for electrical equipment.

== Extension ==
The Danjiang Bridge over the mouth of the Tamsui River on the Taiwan strait is under construction to accommodate an extension of the Danhai LRT over the river to connect the town of Bali.

== See also ==
- Rail transport in Taiwan
- List of railway stations in Taiwan
- Ankeng light rail
- Circular light rail
- Sanying line
