= Tamsui metro station =

Tamsui-Xinyi Line's MRT station

Tamsui / V21 淡水
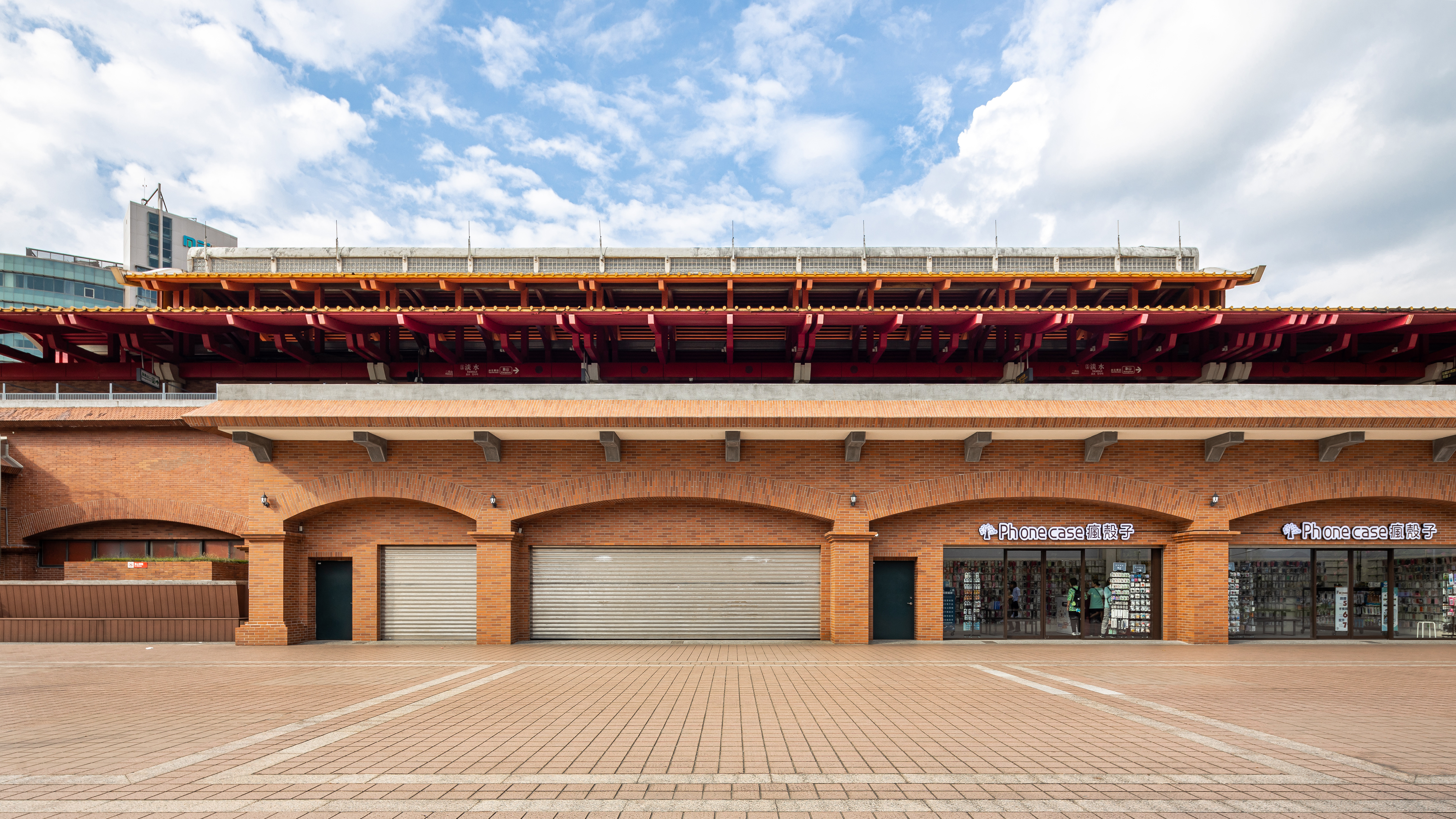
- Exterior view of Tamsui station in 2023

General information
- Location: 1 Zhongzheng Rd; Tamsui, New Taipei; Taiwan
- Coordinates: 25.1681°N 121.4455°E
- System: Taipei Metro station; New Taipei light rail station
- Lines: Tamsui–Xinyi Line (R28); Danhai LRT (V21)

Construction
- Structure type: Elevated
- Cycle facilities: No access

Other information
- Station code: / V21
- Website: web.metro.taipei/e/stationdetail2010.asp?ID=R28-071

History
- Opened: 28 March 1997 (Tamsui-Xinyi Line) 2024 (Danhai LRT)

Passengers
- 2017: 27.914 million per year ▼3.06%
- Rank: (Ranked 13 of 119)

Services
Preceding station	Taipei Metro	Following station
Hongshulin towards Guangci/Fengtian Temple	Tamsui–Xinyi Line	Terminus

Future services
Preceding station	New Taipei Metro	Following station
Terminus	Danhai LRT Blue Coast line	Mackay Street towards Hongshulin
Location

Tamsui metro station

Chinese name
- Chinese: 淡水
- Literal meaning: Freshwater
Transcriptions
Standard Mandarin
- Hanyu Pinyin: Dànshuǐ
- Bopomofo: ㄉㄢˋ ㄕㄨㄟˇ
- Wade–Giles: Tan⁴-shui³
Hakka
- Pha̍k-fa-sṳ: Thâm-súi
Southern Min
- Hokkien POJ: Tām-chúi
- Tâi-lô: Tām-tsuí

Japanese name
- Kanji: 淡水駅
- Kana: たんすいえき
Transcriptions
- Romanization: Tansui Eki

Tamsui (Chinese: 淡水; pinyin: Dànshuǐ) is a metro station in New Taipei, Taiwan served by Taipei Metro. It is the terminal station of the Tamsui–Xinyi Line. The location of the station can be traced back to the same-named station of the now-defunct Tamsui railway line. Tamsui station is the northernmost metro station in Taiwan.

== Station overview ==
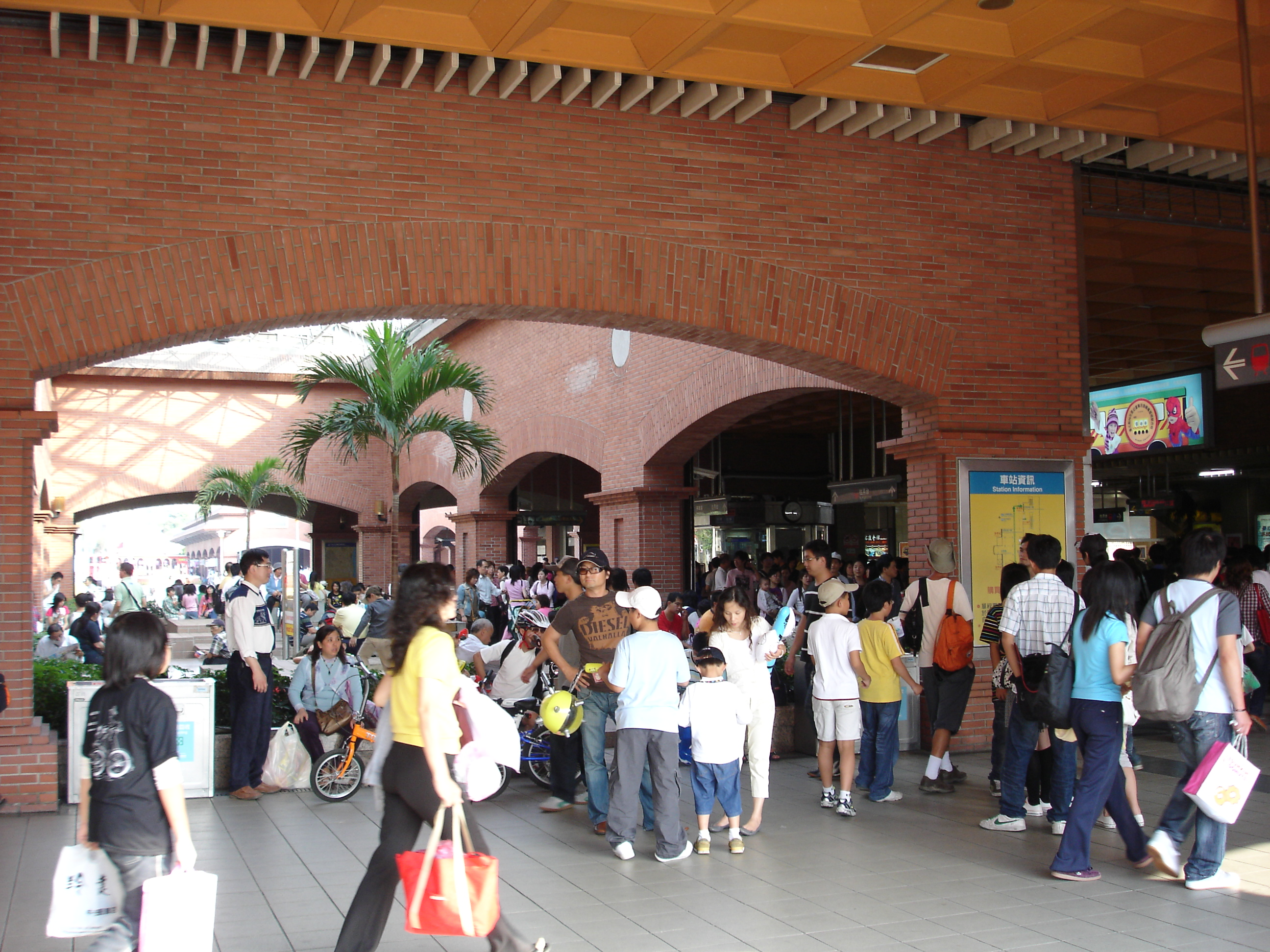
Inside Tamsui station

The two-level, elevated station has an island platform and two exits. The station is situated between the south side of Zhongzheng West Road and west of the Zhongshan-Zhongzheng Road intersection. Restrooms are located inside the main entrance area.

The station is heavily used by people looking to visit the sea-side district of Tamsui. It connects Tamsui River, Tamsui Sunset Scenic Area, Riverside Park, Tamsui River Bike Route, Tamsui District Office, Tamsui Old Street, Tamsui Church and Yingzhuan Road Night Market.

Like several stations (most interchange stations and all stations in Wenhu Line and Circular Line) in the network, Tamsui station does not grant commuters with non-folded bicycle access to the station building. Bike commuters are required to alight at Hongshulin station, 2.7 kilometers away from Tamsui station.

== History ==
On 25 October 1901, it had opened with the Tamsui Railroad line as Tamsui station (Japanese: 淡水停車場). The renovated station opened in 1951. On 15 July 1988, the station was closed with the ending of service on the TRA Tamsui line. It had two side platforms. Construction of the new Tamsui station began on 15 December 1988 for the opening on 28 March 1997 under Taipei Metro Tamsui line.

From 1999 to 2014, trains from Xindian terminated at Tamsui Station while construction work was conducted on the Songshan-Xindian Line.

=== Station Exits ===
Exits 1 and 2 are located on the northeast side of the station, with an accessible elevator situated next to the exits. Due to the large volume of passengers, two separate fare gates are provided. In 2019, Exit 3 was added on the southwest side.

Exit	Image	Location
Entrance/Exit １		Zhongzheng Road (Tamsui Old Street)
Entrance/Exit ２		Xuefu Road
Entrance/Exit ３		Golden Anchor (Tamsui Sunset Waterfront)

== First and last train timings ==
The first and last train timings for Tamsui station are as follows:

Destination	First train		Last train
Destination	Mon − Fri	Sat − Sun and P.H.	Daily
Tamsui–Xinyi line
R01 Guangci/Fengtian Temple	06:00	06:00	00:00
