= Provincial Highway 2 (Taiwan) =

Road in Taiwan

Provincial Highway 2
- 台2線
- Northern Coastal Highway

Route information
- Maintained by Directorate General of Highways
- Length: 167.674 km (104.188 mi)
- Existed: 1962–present

Major junctions
- West end: Prov 2B / Prov 15 in Tamsui District, New Taipei City
- Nat 3 in Keelung
- East end: Prov 9 in Su'ao, Yilan County

Location
- Country: Taiwan

Highway system
- Highway system in Taiwan
← Prov 1	→ Prov 3

Provincial Highway No. 2 (台2線) is an east-west, 167.674 km-long provincial Taiwanese highway that starts from the border of Taipei and Tamsui and ends in Su'ao, Yilan. Although designed as an east-west route, the highway actually goes in north-south direction in Yilan County and parts of New Taipei City. The highway serves as the primary road for the north coast cities in Taiwan.

== Route description ==
The entire highway is known as The Northern Coastal Highway (北部濱海公路) or simply Coastal Highway (濱海公路) to the locals, although various names are given for specific stretches of the road. The stretch from Tamsui to Jinshan is also known as Tamsui-Jinshan highway (淡金公路), while the stretch from Jinshan to Keelung City is known as Keelung-Jinshan highway (基金公路).

=== New Taipei City and Keelung ===
The highway begins at Guandu Bridge (關渡大橋), which is also the terminus of PH 2b and PH 15. It bypasses through downtown Tamsui and continues along the northern coasts of Taiwan, passing through Sanzhi, Jinshan, and Wanli. The road goes to the tourist destination of Baisha Bay, Yehliu, and Yehliu Promontory before entering Keelung City. In Keelung, the road goes through the downtown area as well as Port of Keelung before leaving for the northeastern New Taipei City. The highway continues along the coast, passing through Ruifang and Gongliao in New Taipei City. This stretch of the highway provides one of the most scenic views along the road. The scenic spots along the road include Cape Fugui (Taiwan's northernmost point), Cape Bitou (鼻頭角), Cape San Diego Lighthouse (三貂角燈塔), Fulong Beach (福隆海水浴場), Dragon Cave (龍洞), among others. The road continues on to Yilan County.

=== Yilan County ===
The road mostly follows a north-south direction along the coast in the county. It passes through rural and suburban townships of Toucheng, Zhuangwei, Wujie before ending at PH 9 in Su'ao. The road is one of the main highways connecting Keelung and Taipei with Yilan.

== Spur routes ==
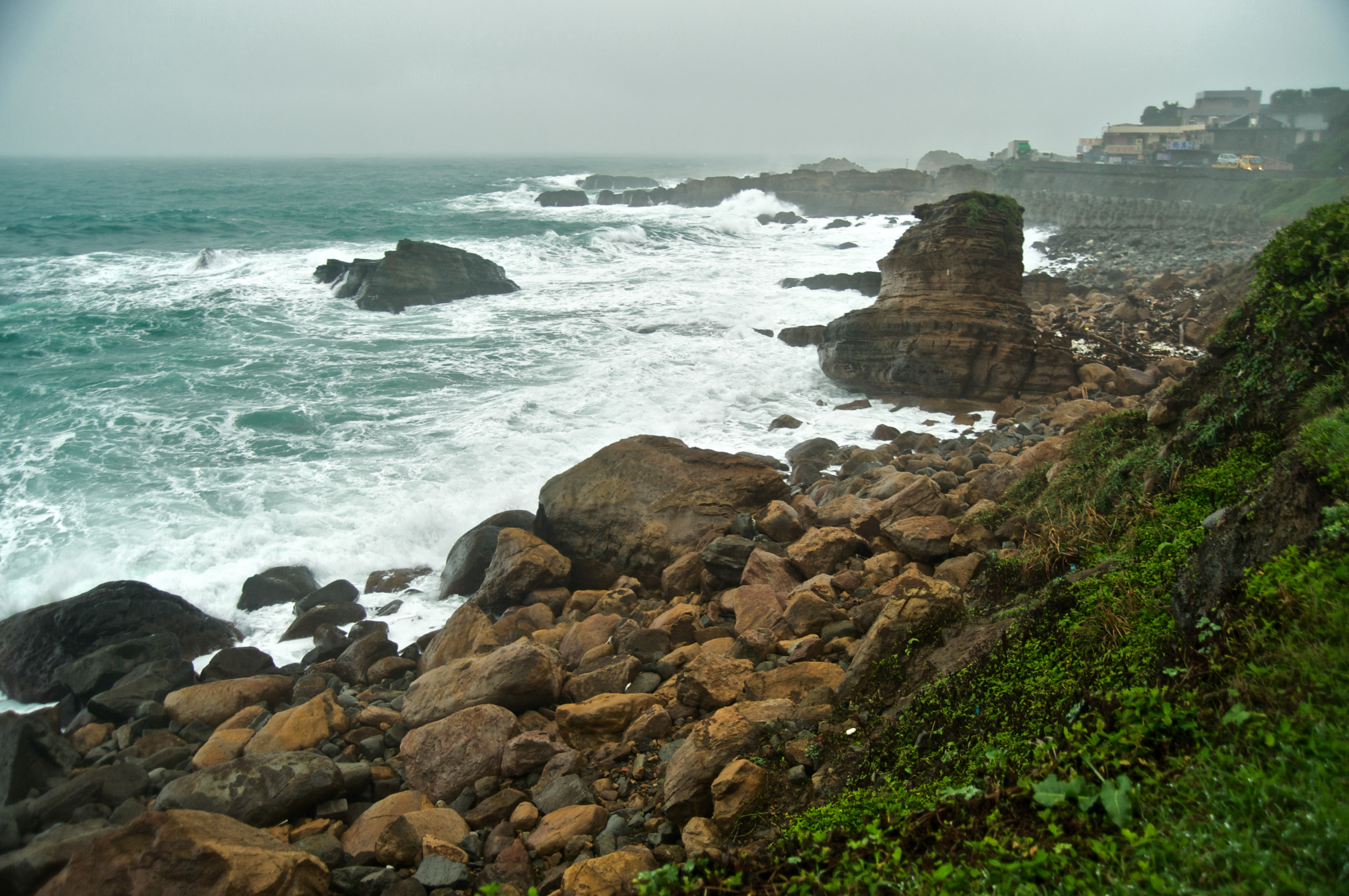
Views from the highway on a stormy day

The highway has 7 spur routes. Each route use the same number, followed by a heavenly stem character. In English, these characters are replaced by letters in alphabetical order.

- Prov 2A (台2甲): Also known as Yangjin Highway (陽金公路) for most part, the road connects downtown Taipei to Highway 2 at Jinshan District, via Yangmingshan National Park located in north Taipei. The highway follows Yangde Ave. (仰德大道) and Zhongshan North Road (中山北路) in Taipei City. The total length is 36.863 km (22.906 mi).
- Prov 2B (台2乙): This route is the old Highway 2 segment that continues on to Taipei. The route starts from downtown Taipei and ends in Tamsui. Within Taipei the road follows Chongqing North Road (重慶北路), Chengde Road (承德路) and Dadu Road (大度路) before entering Tamsui. The road goes into downtown Tamsui before ending at the junction of Highway 2. The total length is 25.279 km.
- Prov 2C (台2丙): This route is a mountain bypass of the parent route for the stretch between Keelung and Gongliao. The road starts at the junction of PH 2D in southern Keelung and ends at Highway 2 in Gongliao. It connects the mountain towns in northeast New Taipei, including Pingxi, Shuangxi and Gongliao. The total length is 29.957 km.
- Prov 2D (台2丁): This route connects National Highway No. 1 and Highway 2, bypassing downtown Keelung. The road runs parallel with PH 62, a limited-access expressway that was built to alleviate the traffic on PH 2D. The total length is 13.390 km.
- Prov 2E (台2戊): This route is the old Highway 2 segment in Yilan County, and goes from Wujie to Su'ao. The route runs parallel with its parent highway. The total length is 12.838 km.
- Prov 2F (台2己): This route connects Port of Keelung and National Highway No. 3 and is used as an alternate route for trucks. This is the only provincial highway that is entirely a limited-access road. The road is entirely within Keelung City. The total length is 4.219 km.
- Prov 2G (台2庚): This route connects National Highway No.5, Highway 9 and Highway 2 in Yilan County. The road is entirely within Toucheng. The total length is 3.741 km.
