= Kanding light rail station =

Light rail station in New Taipei, Taiwan

Coordinates: 25.2010°N 121.4346°E

Kanding V11 崁頂站
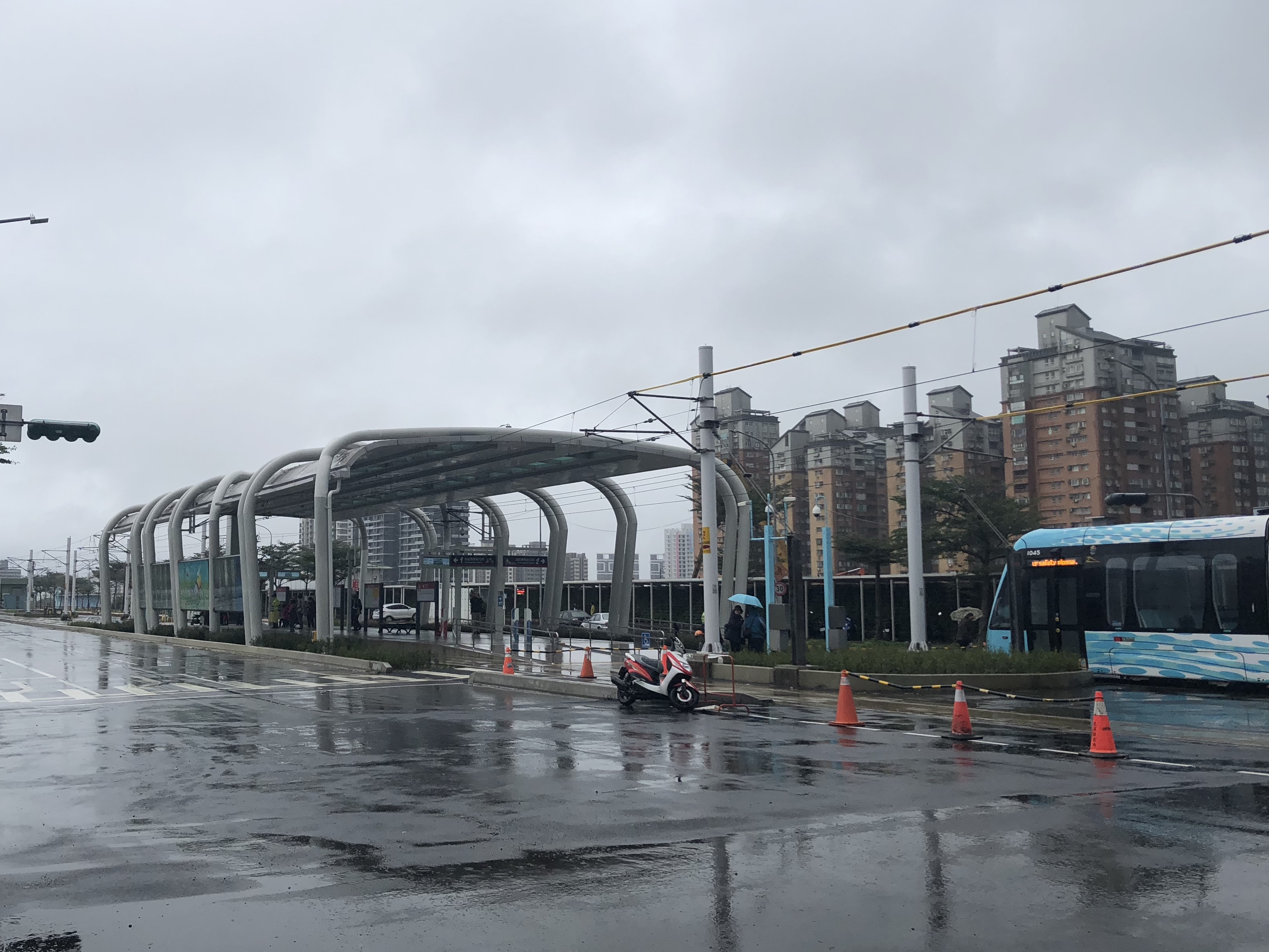
- Station exterior

General information
- Location: Tamsui, New Taipei; Taiwan
- Operated by: New Taipei Metro
- Platforms: 2 side platforms
- Connections: Bus stop

Construction
- Structure type: At-grade
- Accessible: Yes

Other information
- Station code: V11

History
- Opened: December 23, 2018

Services
Preceding station	New Taipei Metro	Following station
Terminus	Danhai LRT Green Mountain line	Danhai New Town towards Hongshulin
Location

Kanding (Chinese: 崁頂站; pinyin: Kǎndǐng Zhàn) is a light rail station of the Danhai light rail, which is operated by New Taipei Metro. It is the northwestern terminus of the line, and is located in Tamsui District, New Taipei, Taiwan.

Kanding station is the northernmost railway station in Taiwan.

== Station overview ==
This is an at-grade station with an island platform. It is located at Shalun Road Section 2 near its intersection with Xinshi 6th Road Section 2.

== Station layout ==
Street level
Street level	Platform 2	← Danhai light rail to Hongshulin (V10 Danhai New Town)
Street level	Island platform, doors open on the left, right
Street level	Platform 1	← Danhai light rail to Hongshulin (V10 Danhai New Town)
Street level	Entrance/exit

== Around the station ==
- Danhai Light Rail Depot
- Miranew Danhai
