= Tamsui Fisherman's Wharf light rail station =

Light rail station in New Taipei, Taiwan

Tamsui Fisherman's Wharf V26 淡水漁人碼頭站
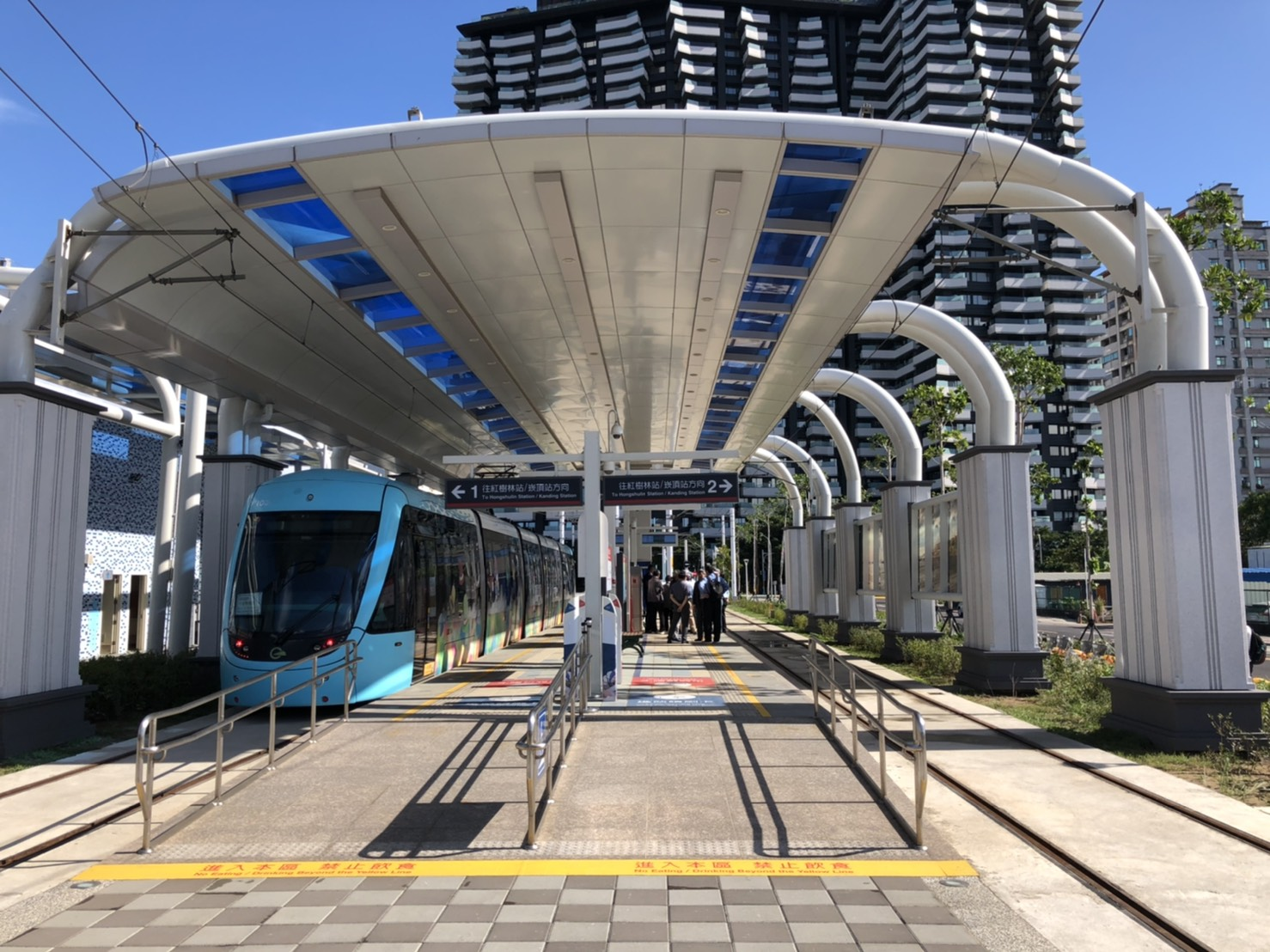
- Station exterior

General information
- Location: Tamsui, New Taipei; Taiwan
- Coordinates: 25.1820°N 121.4186°E
- Operator: New Taipei Metro
- Platforms: Island platform
- Connections: Bus stop

Construction
- Structure type: At-grade
- Accessible: Yes

Other information
- Station code: V26

History
- Opened: 15 November 2020

Services
Preceding station	New Taipei Metro	Following station
Terminus	Danhai LRT Blue Coast line	Shalun towards Hongshulin
Youchekou Future Service towards Tamsui	Danhai LRT Blue Coast line	Shalun towards Hongshulin
Location

Tamsui Fisherman's Wharf (Chinese: 淡水漁人碼頭站; Pinyin: Dànshuǐ yú rén mǎtóu zhàn) is a light rail station on the Blue Coast line (Chinese: 藍海線) of the Danhai light rail, located in Tamsui, New Taipei, Taiwan. It is located next to the Tamsui Fisherman's Wharf, which the station is named after.

== Station overview ==
This is an at-grade station with an island platform. It is located near Section 2, Zhongzheng Road.

== Station layout ==
Street level
Street level	Platform 1	Danhai light rail to Hongshulin (V27 Shalun) →
Street level	Island platform, doors open on the left, right
Street level	Platform 2	Danhai light rail to Hongshulin (V27 Shalun) →
Street level	Entrance/exit

== Around the station ==
- Tamsui Fisherman's Wharf
- Hobe Fort
- Drop of Water Memorial Hall
- New Taipei City Martyrs' Shrine
- Tamsui Customs Wharf
- Fort Santo Domingo

== History ==
Construction of the station started on August 18, 2014, and the station was opened on November 15, 2020.
