= Hongshulin station =

Metro station in New Taipei, Taiwan

Hongshulin /V01 紅樹林
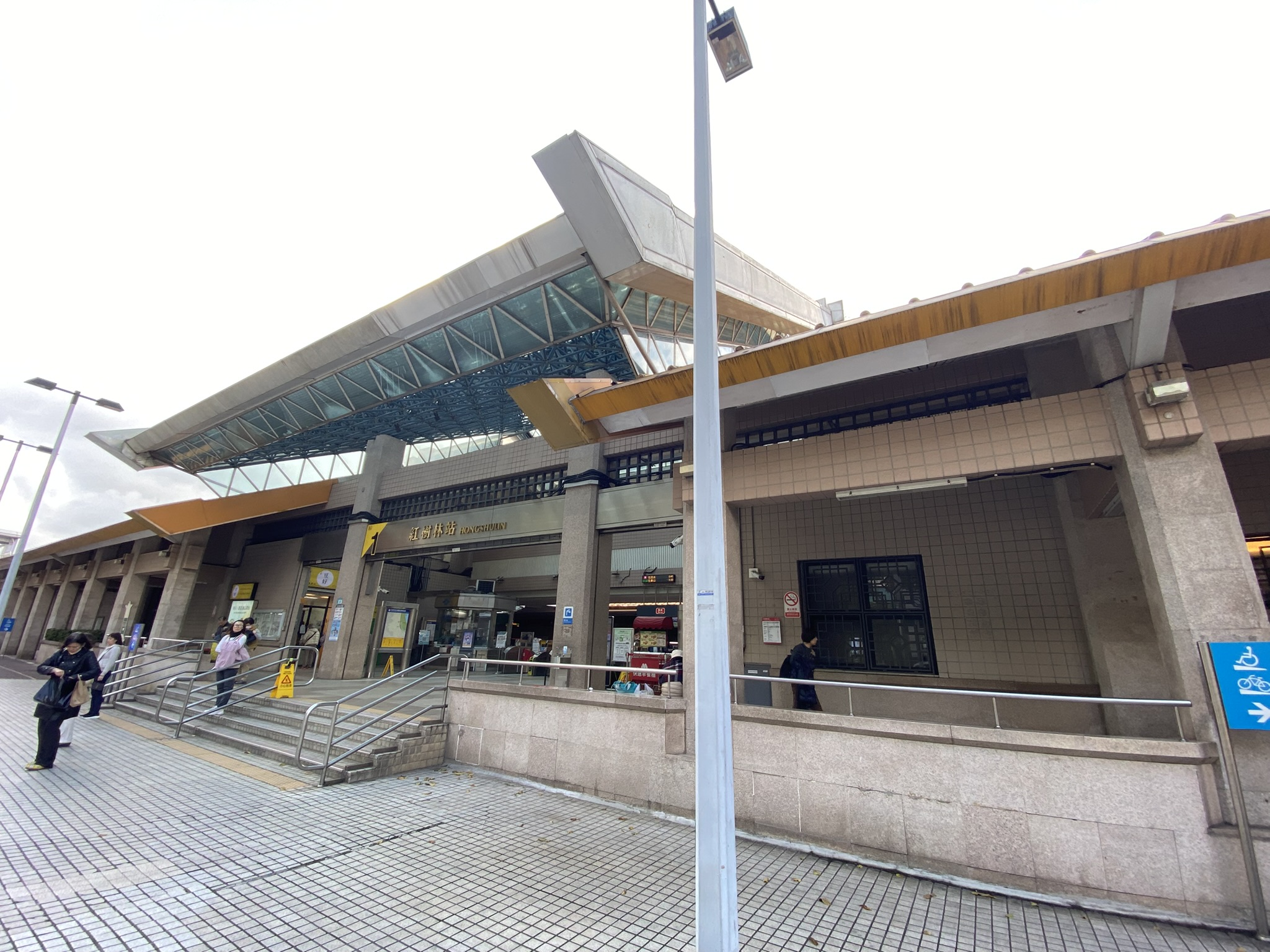
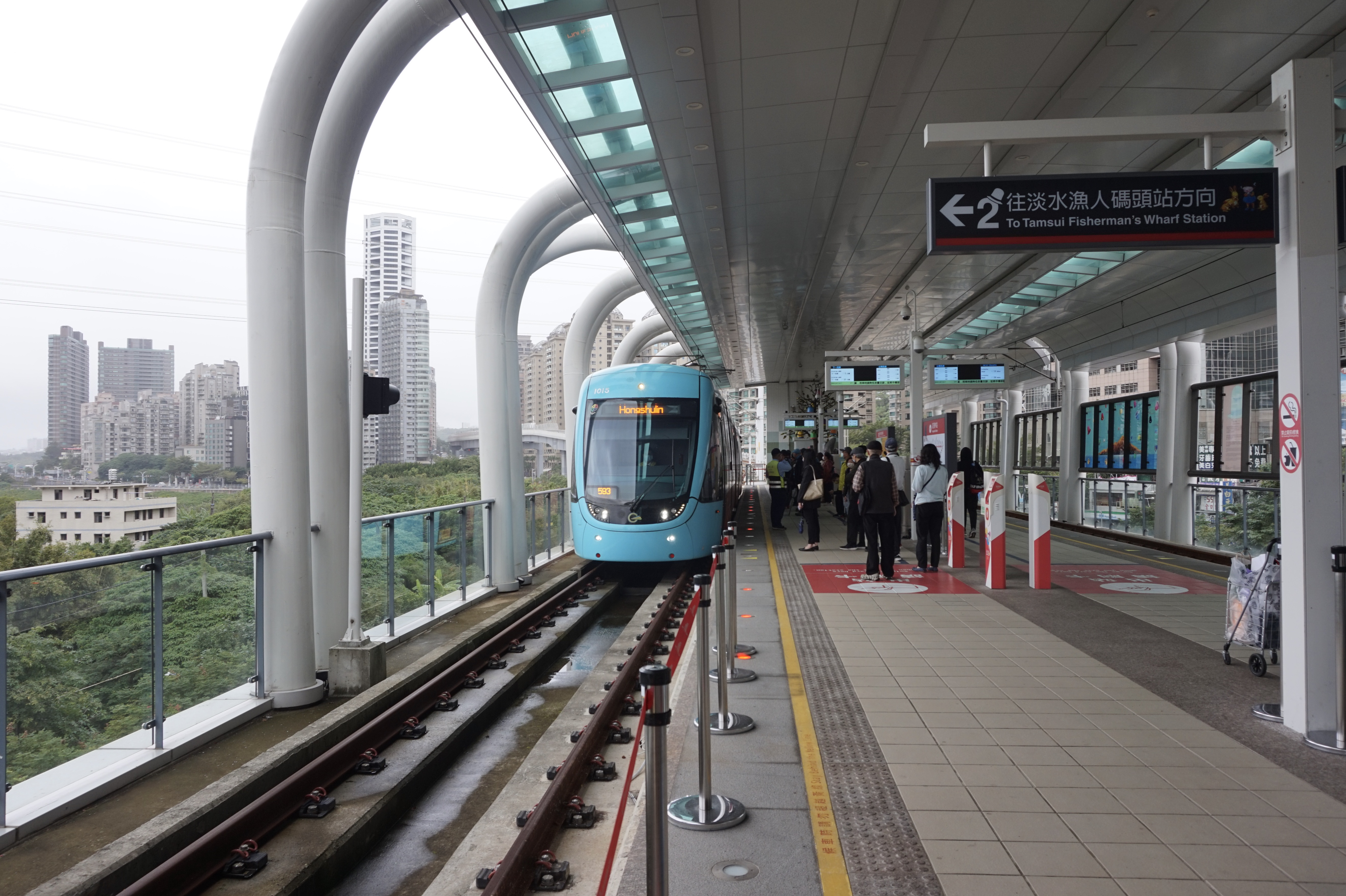
- Top: Hongshulin station entrance Bottom: platform of Danhai light rail

Chinese name
- Traditional Chinese: 紅樹林
- Simplified Chinese: 红树林
- Literal meaning: Mangrove forest
Transcriptions
Standard Mandarin
- Hanyu Pinyin: Hóngshùlín
- Bopomofo: ㄏㄨㄥˊ ㄕㄨˋ ㄌㄧㄣˊ
Hakka
- Pha̍k-fa-sṳ: Fùng-su-lìm
Southern Min
- Hokkien POJ: Âng-chhiū-nâ
- Tâi-lô: Âng-tshiū-nâ

General information
- Location: No. 68, Zhongzheng East Road, Sec. 2 Tamsui, New Taipei; Taiwan
- Coordinates: 25.154103°N 121.459002°E
- Operator: Taipei Metro; New Taipei Metro
- Lines: Tamsui–Xinyi line; Danhai light rail
- Connections: Bus stop

Construction
- Structure type: At-grade (Tamsui-Xinyi line); Elevated (Danhai light rail)

Other information
- Station code: , V01

History
- Opened: 25 December 1997

Passengers
- daily (December 2024)
- Rank: 93 out of 109

Services
Preceding station	Taipei Metro	Following station
Zhuwei towards Guangci/Fengtian Temple	Tamsui–Xinyi line	Tamsui Terminus
Preceding station	New Taipei Metro	Following station
Ganzhenlin towards Kanding or Tamsui Fisherman's Wharf	Danhai LRT	Terminus
Location

Hongshulin (formerly transliterated as Hung Shulin Station until 2003) is a metro and light rail station of the Tamsui–Xinyi line and Danhai light rail in New Taipei, Taiwan, operated by Taipei and New Taipei Metro respectively. The location of station could be traced back the station of the same name on the now-defunct Tamsui railway line.

The station is a terminus for the Danhai light rail serving Danhai New Town.

== Station overview ==
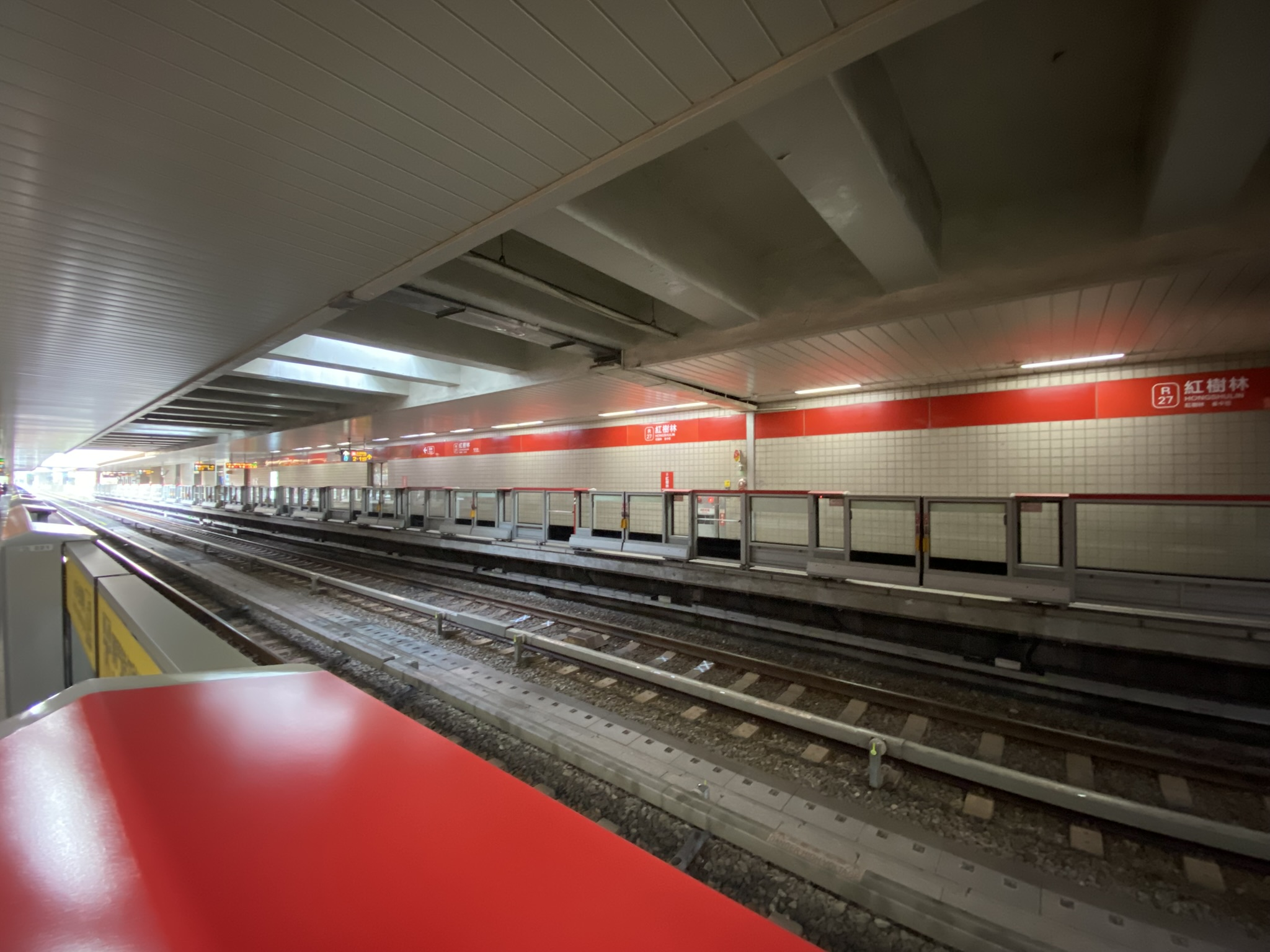
Platform of Tamsui–Xinyi line

The at-grade, station structure with two side platforms and two exits. The washrooms are inside the entrance area.

The station is situated on the east of Zhongzheng West Road, around Bashe Road entrance. The name of the station derives from the protected habitat "Hongshulin" (literally "red forest", meaning mangrove), the Hongshulin environmental protection zone located west of the station.

== Station layout ==
2F	Connecting level	Connecting skyway to Tamsui–Xinyi Line
2F	Platform 1	Danhai light rail to Kanding (V02 Ganzhenlin) →
2F	Island platform, doors open on the left, right
2F	Platform 2	Danhai light rail to Tamsui Fisherman's Wharf (V02 Ganzhenlin) →

Street level
Street level	Concourse (to Platform 1)
Street level	Concourse (to Platform 1)	Entrance/exit, lobby, information desk, convenience store, automatic ticket dispensing machines, one-way faregates Restrooms
Street level	Side platform, doors will open on the right
Street level	Platform 1	← Tamsui–Xinyi line toward Tamsui (R28 terminus)
Street level	Platform 2	→ Tamsui–Xinyi line toward Guangci/Fengtian Temple (R26 Zhuwei) →
Street level	Side platform, doors will open on the right
