= 2017 Zhonghe apartment fire =

Arson attack in Taiwan

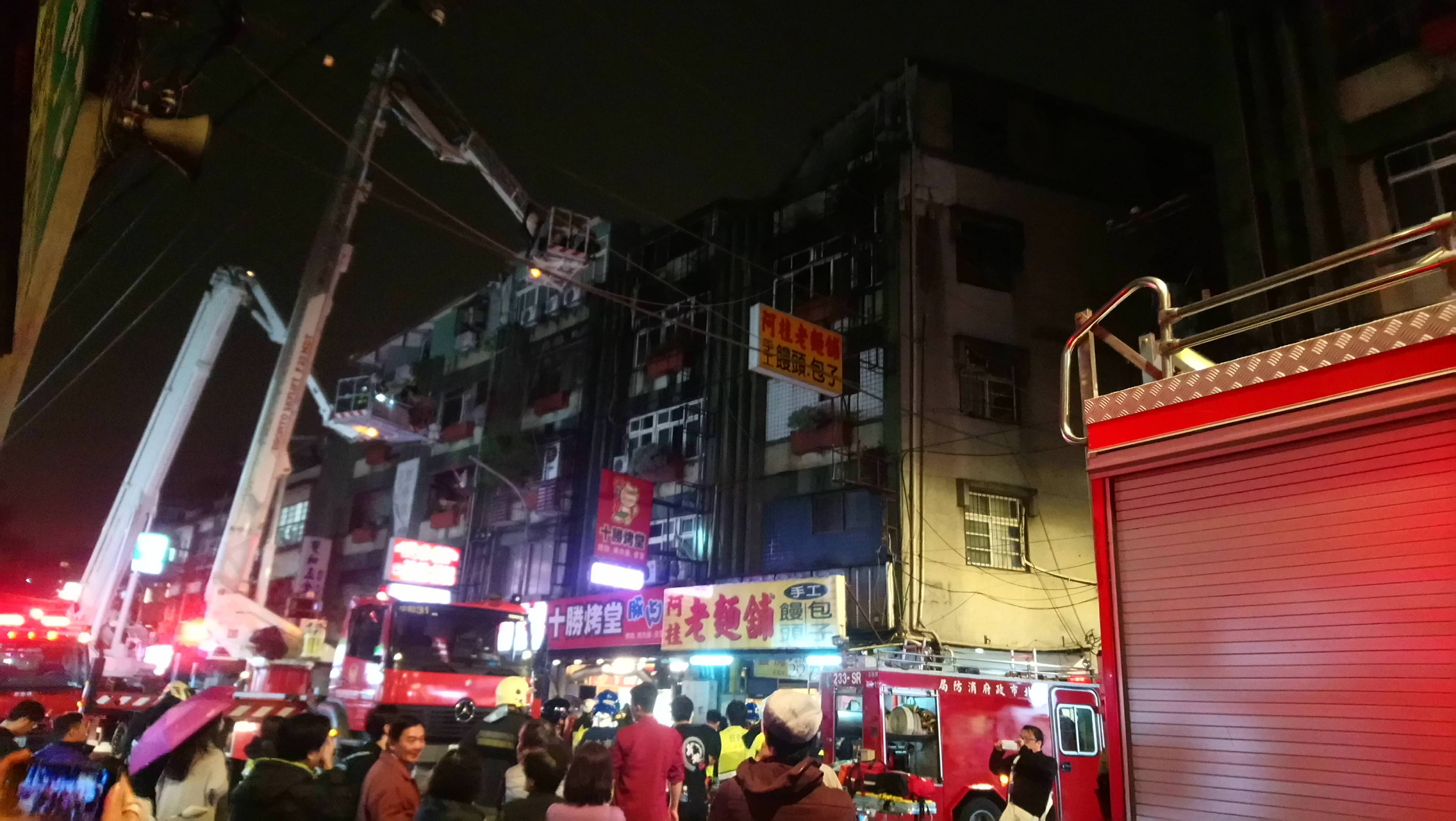
- Firefighters outside the apartment building.
- Location: Zhonghe District, New Taipei City, Taiwan 4–5F, No. 65, Section 2, Xingnan Road
- Date: 22 November 2017 20:37–21:14 (UTC+8)
- Target: Revenge against a fourth-floor resident
- Attack type: Arson Mass murder
- Weapons: Gasoline and a cigarette lighter
- Deaths: 9
- Injuries: 2
- Perpetrator: Li Guohui
- Motive: Personal dispute with a fourth-floor resident

On the night of 22 November 2017, a fire was started at 20:37 in a Subdivided flat in the Nanshijiao area of Zhonghe District, New Taipei City, Taiwan. The arsonist, 49-year-old Li Guohui, had a dispute with a fourth-floor resident and sought revenge by pouring gasoline in storage areas on the third and fourth floors and igniting it with a lighter. The blaze spread through 28 rooms on two floors, killing nine people, causing minor smoke inhalation injuries to two others, and leaving 18 residents in need of temporary accommodation.

== Background ==
The building was located in Nanshijiao, Zhonghe District, near Huaxin Street, commonly known as "Little Burma", where many returned overseas Chinese from Southeast Asia had settled. The community largely consisted of descendants of the Kuomintang in Burma, refugees from the 1967 anti-Chinese riots in Myanmar, and their families. Attracted by nearby factories and relatively low housing prices, Chinese people in Myanmar residents formed communities around Huaxin Street, Xingnan Road Sections 1 and 2, and Zhongxiao Street. Residents cited inexpensive living costs, convenient transportation via Nanshijiao Station, and a familiar cultural environment as reasons for living there. Consequently, illegal construction led to the widespread development of subdivided rental apartments, attracting many migrant workers and people employed outside the district.

The landlord of the apartment was Lian Qiuxiang, aged 56 at the time of the fire. Although she owned no property under her own name, she controlled numerous rental properties in Zhonghe District, Yonghe District, and Tucheng districts. The building involved in the fire was completed in 1976 and was reported for illegal alterations in 2007. Authorities classified it as a Category D ordinary illegal structure. In 2015, Lian acquired the second through fourth floors of an apartment building for 39 million New Taiwan dollars from a real estate broker surnamed Liu. Ownership of the property was registered under her children's names. Together with an illegally added fifth-floor rooftop structure, the building contained 51 rooms across four floors. Studio apartments and Rooming house were rented for around NT$5,000 per month, with individual units measuring only about 3 ping (roughly 10 m²). The fourth floor covered approximately 40 ping..

The building's wooden construction, highly flammable interior materials, lack of fire compartmentation, high fire load, and inadequate escape routes—a single central corridor with the only staircase located at the ignition point—created severe fire hazards. Illegal partitioning and rooftop additions by previous owners, combined with cramped spaces, contributed to a chimney effect that accelerated the spread of smoke and flames. Numerous undocumented migrant workers were also living in the building, resulting in a complex population. According to tenant Liu Qingzong, cooking inside the rooms was prohibited.

The perpetrator, Li Guohui, was an unemployed ethnic Chinese from Myanmar who suffered from substance abuse involving amphetamine and was 49 years old at the time of the incident. According to the New Taipei City Fire Department， Li had previously committed two arson attacks. On 21 May 2017, after failing to collect a debt from a friend, he set fire to a residence on Lane 109, Huaxin Street, using two gasoline-filled bottles and oil-soaked ropes. On 21 June, he burned two motorcycles parked near the eventual fire scene.Although neither incident caused casualties, after the cases were transferred to the New Taipei District Prosecutors Office, Li repeatedly failed to appear when summoned. Despite arrest warrants being issued, police did not apprehend him.

The November 2017 fire was Li's third arson attack. Following an argument with fellow Burmese resident Hu Jinfu, who lived on the fourth floor, Li sought revenge. After purchasing gasoline at a filling station, he stored a plastic bottle filled with gasoline in the stairwell. On the evening of the incident, he poured gasoline into storage areas on the third and fourth floors and ignited it with a lighter. Before committing the crime, Li changed his appearance. He initially wore a camouflage T-shirt and a red vest, but after fleeing the scene he stole clothing from a nearby residence and changed into a pink polo shirt before being arrested.

== Incident ==
The New Taipei City Fire Department received reports of the fire at 20:37 on 22 November. The Emergency Rescue Command Center dispatched ten units from the Fifth and Seventh Brigades, the Special Search and Rescue Brigade, the Emergency Response Team, and the Emergency operations center, while activating the mass casualty incident mechanism.A total of 34 fire engines, 27 ambulances, and 178 firefighters were sent to the scene, arriving at 20:42.One resident on the fourth floor continuously called for help from a window, throwing personal belongings and furniture outside and at one point appearing ready to jump. The fire was brought under control at approximately 21:02 and completely extinguished twelve minutes later.Firefighters used ladders to rescue the resident in time.

Investigations showed that the fire damaged five rental rooms on the third floor over an area of about 15 ping (approximately 50 square metres), while fourteen rooms on the fourth floor covering about 25 ping (approximately 83 square metres) burned, accounting for 62.5% of that floor's area. Another fourteen rooms on the fifth floor were heavily smoke-damaged.

The blaze affected 28 rooms across two floors. While clearing the fourth-floor rear area, firefighters discovered two charred bodies, one lying in the corridor and the other at the far end of the floor.After several days of DNA identification and coordination with the New Taipei City Police Department and Labor Affairs Department, one victim was confirmed to be Hu Jinfu, the fourth-floor resident with whom the perpetrator had previously argued. Seven severely injured victims were pronounced dead on arrival at hospitals, most of whom died from respiratory failure caused by smoke inhalation. Two others suffered minor smoke inhalation , while 18 residents from 14 households were temporarily housed at the Hongren Hotel on Jingxin Street by the Zhonghe District Office.

== Aftermath ==
After learning of the fire, then Mayor of New Taipei City Eric Chu visited the scene that evening to express support for firefighters and to receive updates on rescue efforts and post-disaster arrangements. Nine victims were sent to Taipei Medical University Shuang-Ho Hospital , Taipei Tzu Chi Hospital, Cardinal Tien Hospital in Xindian, and Cardinal Tien Hospital in Yonghe. Social workers stationed at these hospitals assisted victims' families and provided necessary support. Residents from the first and second floors were temporarily accommodated in nearby hotels by the Zhonghe District Office for up to five days.

Deputy Mayor Hou Yu-ih convened an emergency meeting on 23 November, instructing police to strengthen the "building sweep operation" and calling for inspections of residences rented to students, migrant workers, low-income households, and buildings with complicated occupancy. Inspections focused on fire safety equipment and public safety violations, with illegal structures referred for further action. In addition to immediate condolence payments of NT$10,000 for each deceased victim and NT$5,000 for each injured person, the city government provided NT$200,000 to each bereaved family and an additional NT$100,000 to the families of foreign migrant workers. Funeral expenses were fully covered by the New Taipei City Government.

Eric Chu and Hou later visited bereaved families at Banqiao Funeral Home on 23 November and 1 December. Hou instructed the Department of Social Welfare and the Funeral Management Office to provide full assistance and arranged with the Indonesian Economic and Trade Office in Taipei to repatriate the remains of two Indonesian victims for burial. Volunteers from the Tzu Chi Foundation visited the scene, brought food and bread to firefighters and police officers, and provided emergency assistance and relief funds to victims and their families.

Police immediately established a special task force. Hou stated that the fire was unlikely to have been caused by electrical malfunction, noting that the walls were blackened with soot and that the origin did not appear to be inside a room. Suspecting arson, he ordered investigators to review surveillance footage. At 03:00 on 23 November, police arrested Li Guohui at the intersection of Huaxin Street and Xingnan Road Section 2. Li falsely claimed that he had purchased gasoline to refuel a vehicle, but investigators discovered that he did not own one.

Prosecutors charged Li with public endangerment and murder and transferred him to the New Taipei District Prosecutors Office. Following questioning, prosecutors requested detention, and the New Taipei District Court approved the request early on 24 November.

Landlord Lian Qiuxiang was investigated on suspicion of public endangerment and negligent homicide. She was transferred to The New Taipei District Prosecutors Office on the afternoon of 23 November and was released on NT$50,000 bail later that evening. On 24 November, officials accompanied structural engineers back to the scene for inspection. The Public Works Department imposed a NT$300,000 fine and requested judicial authorities to freeze her assets. Lian was later sentenced by the New Taipei District Court to two years' imprisonment for negligent homicide. On appeal, the Taiwan High Court reduced the sentence to one year and ten months, and the Supreme Court upheld the ruling, making the sentence final.

The tragedy prompted a surge of reports concerning illegal structures. Between 23 and 24 November, the city's Demolition Squad received 194 complaints through phone calls and emails. The Public Works Department announced that it would begin forcibly demolishing 205 registered rooftop additions on 8 December. Continued inspections led some owners to remove illegal structures voluntarily, reducing the number of pending cases to 124.On the first day of the demolition campaign, the first case addressed was the illegal rooftop additions at Nos. 387-3 and 389-3 Jingxin Street, near Nanshijiao in Zhonghe District, which, like the fire site, were located in the surrounding area..

On the same day, legislator Lin Chun-hsien proposed amendments to the Building Act to establish a "Whistleblowing", converting fines for illegal structures—ranging from NT$60,000 to NT$300,000—into rewards for tenants who report unsafe Rental housing, thereby encouraging reporting and providing legal protection.

== Trials ==
- 7 June 2018: The New Taipei District Courtsentenced Li Guohui to death and deprived him of civil rights for life for murder.
- 14 May 2019: The Taiwan High Court overturned the original ruling but again sentenced Li to death and lifelong deprivation of civil rights.
- 31 July 2019: The Supreme Court（Taiwan） overturned the judgment and remanded the case to the High Court.
- 31 March 2020: Upon retrial, the High Court again sentenced Li to death and lifelong deprivation of civil rights.
- 23 July 2020: The Supreme Court once again overturned the ruling and ordered another retrial.
- 14 April 2021: In the second retrial, the Taiwan High Court again imposed the death penalty and lifelong deprivation of civil rights.
- 23 December 2021: The Supreme Court（Taiwan） for a third time overturned the High Court ruling and remanded the case for further proceedings.
