= Yongan Market metro station =

Metro station in New Taipei, Taiwan

Yongan Market 永安市場
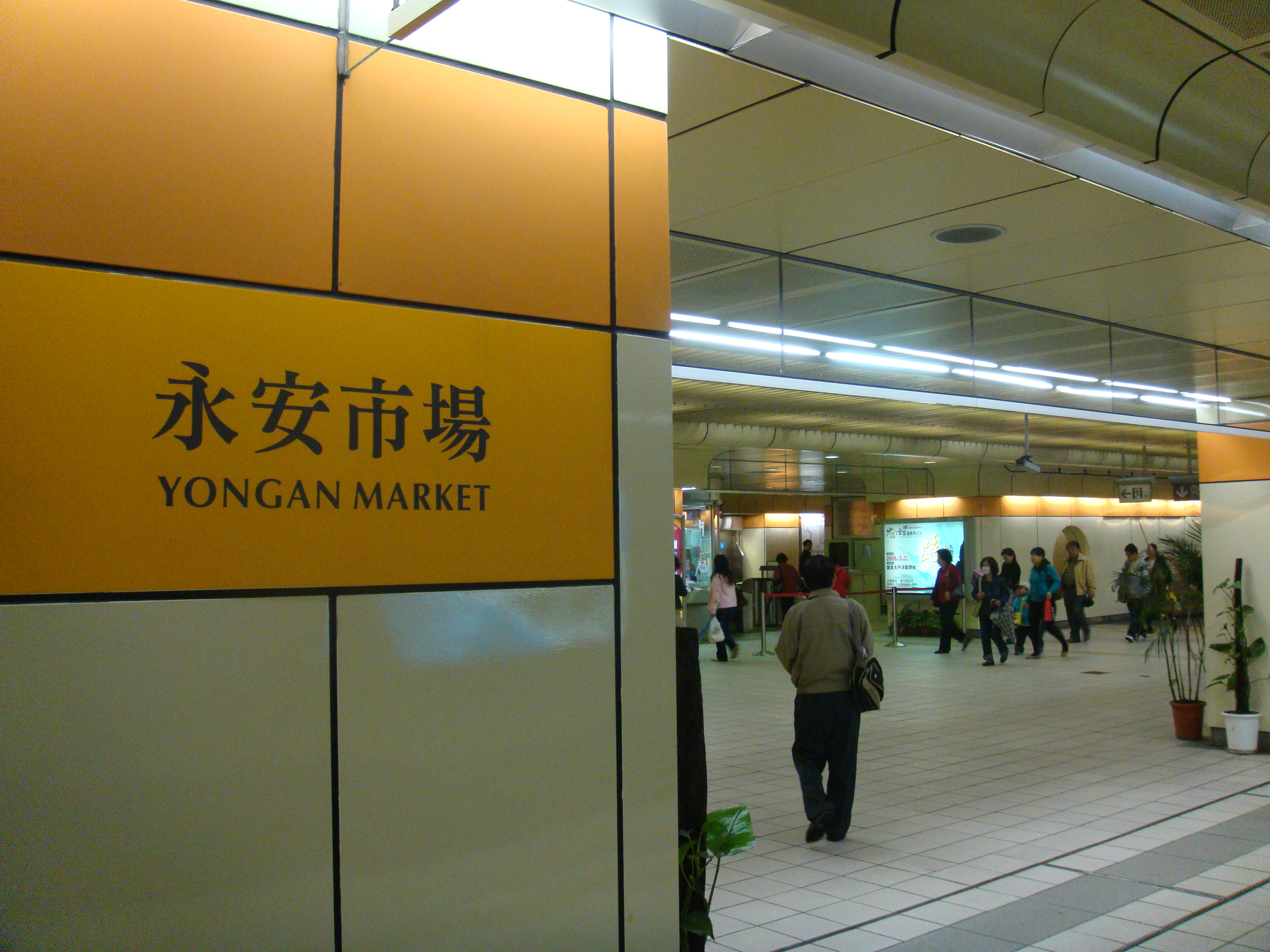
- Platform

Chinese name
- Traditional Chinese: 永安市場
- Simplified Chinese: 永安市场
Transcriptions
Standard Mandarin
- Hanyu Pinyin: Yǒng'ān Shìchǎng
- Bopomofo: ㄩㄥˇ ㄢ ㄕˋ ㄔㄤˇ
Hakka
- Pha̍k-fa-sṳ: Yún-ôn Sṳ-chhòng
Southern Min
- Tâi-lô: ing-an-tshī-tîunn

General information
- Location: 388 Zhonghe Rd; Zhonghe, New Taipei; Taiwan
- Coordinates: 25.0023°N 121.5110°E
- System: Taipei metro station
- Line: Zhonghe–Xinlu line

Construction
- Structure type: Underground
- Cycle facilities: Access available

Other information
- Station code: O03
- Website: web.metro.taipei/e/stationdetail2010.asp?ID=O03-046

History
- Opened: 1998-12-24

Passengers
- 2017: 18.571 million per year ▲0.29%
- Rank: (Ranked 34 of 119)

Services
Preceding station	Taipei Metro	Following station
Jingan towards Nanshijiao	Zhonghe–Xinlu line	Dingxi towards Huilong or Luzhou
Location

Yongan Market (Chinese: 永安市場; pinyin: Yǒng'ān Shìchǎng, formerly transliterated as Yung-An Market Station until 2003) is a metro station in New Taipei, Taiwan served by the Taipei Metro. It is a station on the Zhonghe–Xinlu line.

== Station overview ==
This four-level, underground station has two stacked side platforms (a split platform configuration) and one exit. The platforms are parallel to one another.

== Station layout ==
Street level	Exit/entrance	Exit/entrance
B1	Station offices	Underground walkway
B2	Concourse	Lobby, toilets, one-way ticket machine, information desk
B2	Side platform, doors will open on the right
B2	Platform 1	← Zhonghe–Xinlu line toward Luzhou / Huilong (O04 Dingxi)
B4	Side platform, doors will open on the left
B4	Platform 2	Zhonghe–Xinlu line toward Nanshijiao (O02 Jingan) →

=== Exits ===
- Single exit: Zhonghe Rd.

== Around the station ==
- Northern Regional Office of Taiwan Water Corp.
- National Taiwan Library
- 823 Memorial Park
- Yongan Market
