= Y10 =

Y10 may refer to:

== Train stations ==
- Higashi-ikebukuro Station, in Toshima, Tokyo, Japan
- Jingping metro station, in Taipei, Taiwan
- Marugame Station, in Kagawa, Japan
- Tennō Station (Hiroshima), in Kure, Hiroshima, Japan

== Other uses ==
- Autobianchi Y10, an Italian automobile
- LNER Class Y10, a class of 0-4-0 geared steam locomotives built by Sentinel Waggon Works
- LNER Class Y10 (Wheatley), a class of 0-4-0 steam tender locomotives of the North British Railway
- Shanghai Y-10, a Chinese airliner
