= Jingan metro station =

Metro station in New Taipei, Taiwan

Jingan / 景安
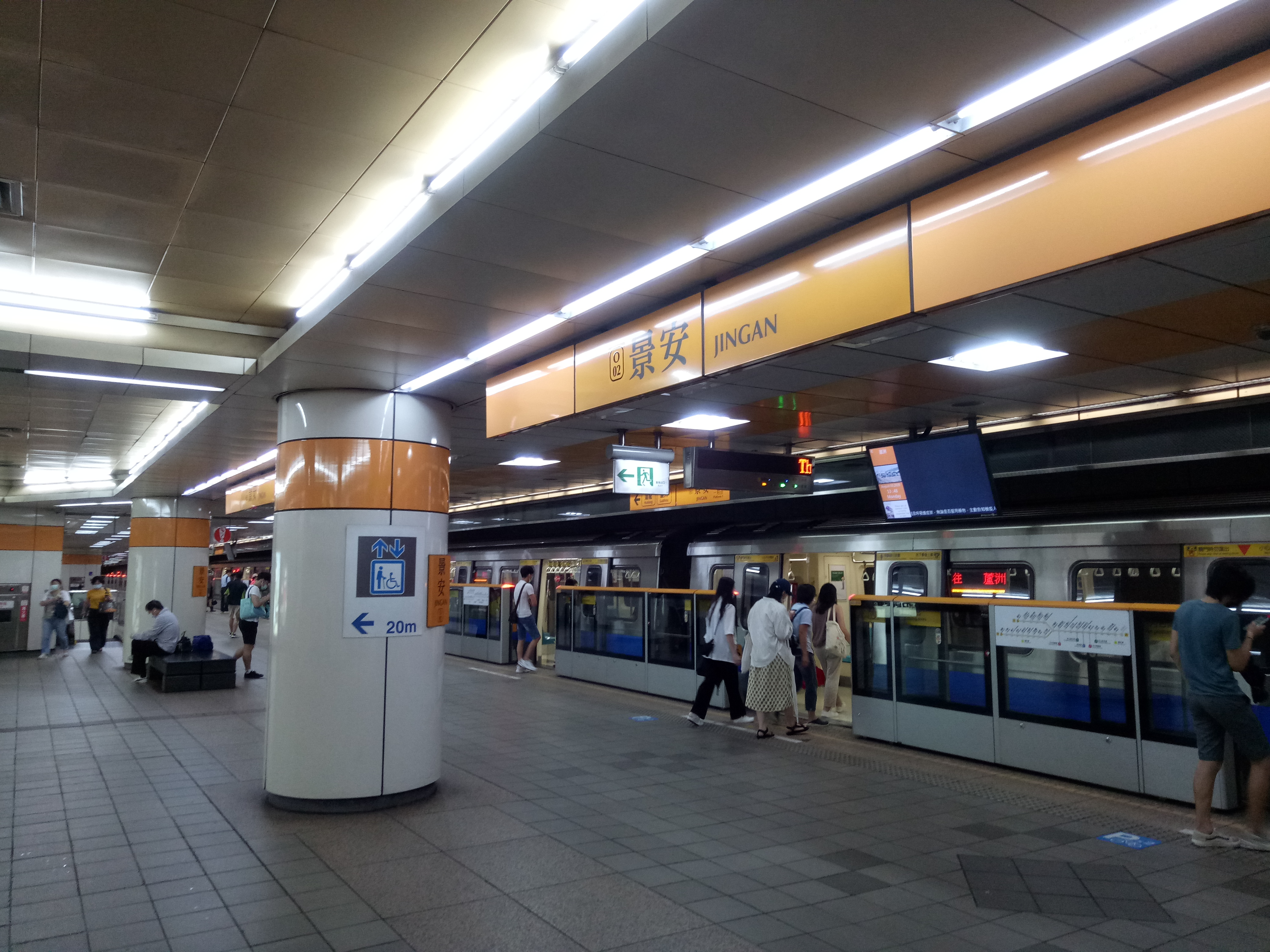
- Platform

Chinese name
- Chinese: 景安
Transcriptions
Standard Mandarin
- Hanyu Pinyin: Jǐng'ān
- Bopomofo: ㄐㄧㄥˇ ㄢ
- Wade–Giles: Ching³ An¹
Hakka
- Pha̍k-fa-sṳ: Kín-ôn
Southern Min
- Tâi-lô: Kíng-an

General information
- Location: 168 Jingan Rd, 486 Jingping Rd; Zhonghe, New Taipei; Taiwan
- Coordinates: 24.9939°N 121.5046°E
- System: Taipei Metro and New Taipei Metro station
- Lines: Zhonghe–Xinlu line (O02); Circular line

Construction
- Structure type: Underground
- Cycle facilities: Access available

Other information
- Station code: /
- Website: web.metro.taipei/e/stationdetail2010.asp?ID=O02-047

History
- Opened: Zhonghe-Xinlu line: 1998-12-24, Circular line: 2020-01-31

Passengers
- 2017: 17.308 million per year ▼0.46%
- Rank: (Ranked 27 of 119)

Services
Preceding station	Taipei Metro	Following station
Nanshijiao Terminus	Zhonghe–Xinlu line	Yongan Market towards Huilong or Luzhou
Preceding station	New Taipei Metro	Following station
Jingping towards Dapinglin	Circular line	Zhonghe towards NT Industrial Park
Location

Jingan (Chinese: 景安, formerly transliterated as Ching-An Station until 2003) is a metro station in New Taipei, Taiwan, served by the Taipei Metro and New Taipei Metro. It is a transfer station between the Zhonghe–Xinlu line and Circular line. The elevated Circular line platforms opened on 31 January 2020.

== Station overview ==
This six-level, underground station has two stacked side platforms (a split platform configuration), two side platforms and one exit. Jingan station is the only transfer station in the Taipei Metro to have only one exit.

Due to the availability of the station area, when the Zhonghe line platform was being constructed, it adapted a stacked side platform configuration, making the platform level reach to six levels underground, making it one of the deepest stations in the metro system. The elevated Circular line, on the other hand, is one of the highest stations in the metro system with the platform level located five floors above ground, due to the Circular line needing to share the same path as Provincial Highway 64 on some parts of the line. Transferring from the Zhonghe-Xinlu line to the Circular line or vice versa takes about 5 minutes, with the height difference between the two platforms reaching 10 levels, the largest height difference of all transfer stations in the Taipei Metro.

== Station layout ==
6F	Connecting level	Platforms-connecting overpass
5F	Side platform, doors will open on the right
5F	Platform 1	← Circular line towards New Taipei Industrial Park (Y12 Zhonghe)
5F	Platform 2	Circular line towards Dapinglin (Y10 Jingping) →
5F	Side platform, doors will open on the right

3F	Connecting level	Restrooms (inside paid area)
Street level	Concourse	Exit/entrance, lobby, toilets, one-way ticket machine, information desk
B3	Station offices	Underground walkway
B4	Platform 1	← Zhonghe–Xinlu line toward Luzhou / Huilong (O03 Yongan Market)
B4	Side platform, doors will open on the left
B6	Platform 2	Zhonghe–Xinlu line toward Terminus (O01 Nanshijiao) →
B6	Side platform, doors will open on the right

=== Exits ===
- Single exit: Jingan Rd.

== Around the station ==
- Jinshan Bannan Park (250m south of the station)
- Zhonghe Heping Street Market (250m southeast of the station)
