= Xiulang Bridge metro station =

Metro station in New Tapei, Taiwan

Xiulang Bridge 秀朗橋
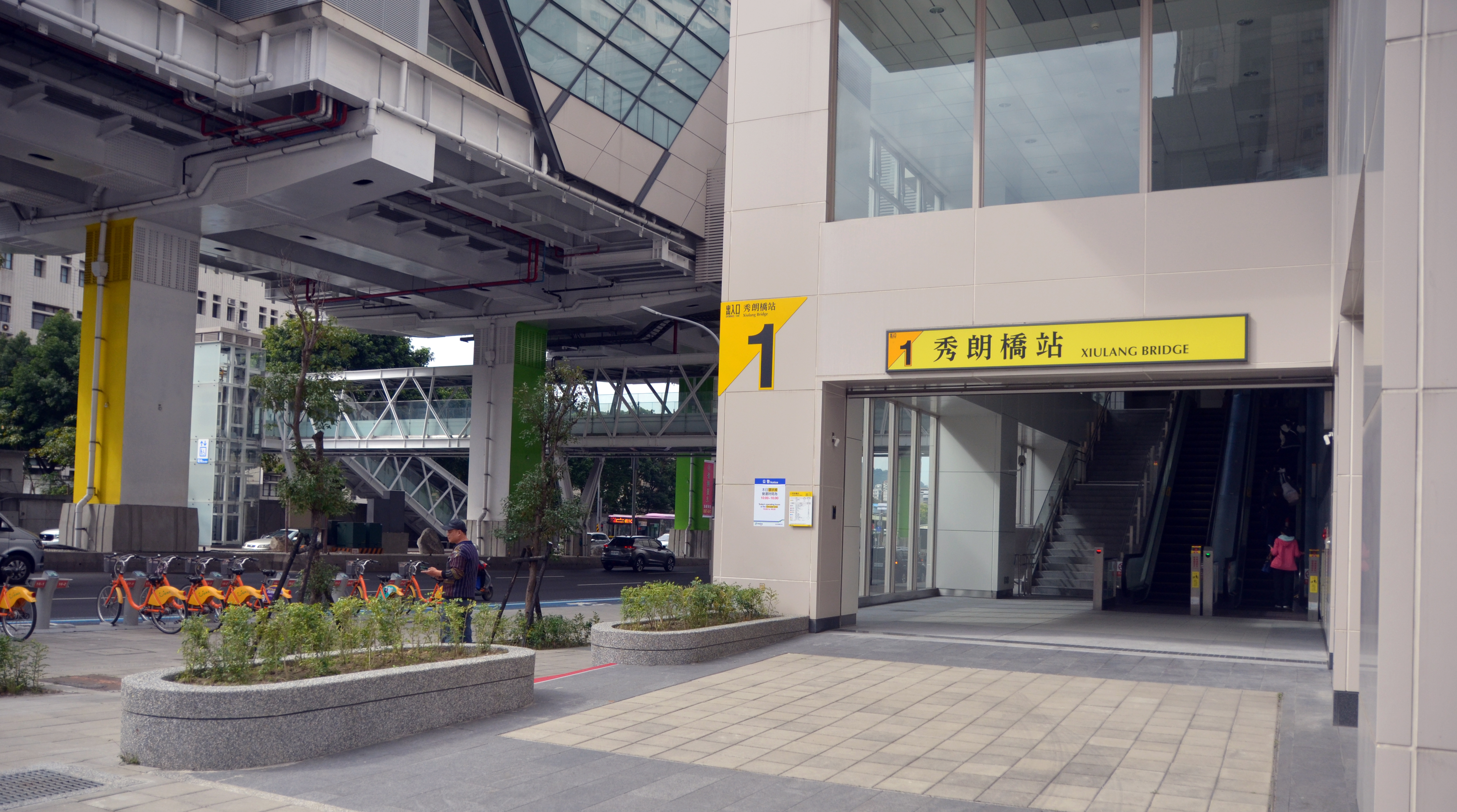
- Station entrance

Chinese name
- Traditional Chinese: 秀朗橋
- Simplified Chinese: 秀朗桥
Transcriptions
Standard Mandarin
- Hanyu Pinyin: Xìulǎng Qiáo
- Bopomofo: ㄒㄧㄡˋㄌㄤˇㄑㄧㄠˊ
- Wade–Giles: Hsiu⁴-lang³ Ch'iao²
Hakka
- Pha̍k-fa-sṳ: Siù-lóng-kiâu
Southern Min
- Tâi-lô: Siù-lóng Kiô

General information
- Location: Zhonghe, New Taipei; Taiwan
- Coordinates: 24.99033°N 121.524986°E
- Operated by: New Taipei Metro
- Line: Circular line
- Platforms: 2
- Connections: Bus stop

Construction
- Structure type: Elevated
- Accessible: Yes

Other information
- Station code: Y09

History
- Opened: 31 January 2020

Services
Preceding station	New Taipei Metro	Following station
Shisizhang towards Dapinglin	Circular line	Jingping towards NT Industrial Park
Location

Xiulang Bridge station is a station on the New Taipei Metro's Circular line. The station was opened on 31 January 2020. It is located in Zhonghe District, New Taipei, Taiwan, near the banks of the Xindian River. The station name is derived from the bridge of the same name near the station.

== Station layout ==
5F	Connecting level	Platforms-connecting overpass
4F	Platform level	Restrooms (inside paid area)
4F	Side platform, doors will open on the right
4F	Platform 1	← Circular line toward New Taipei Industrial Park (Y10 Jingping)
4F	Platform 2	→ Circular line toward Dapinglin (Y08 Shisizhang) →
4F	Side platform, doors will open on the right

2F
2F	Concourse	Lobby, Information desk, automatic ticket machines, one-way faregates, shops, restrooms (outside paid area)

Street level	Ground level	Entrance/exit

== Exits ==
- Exit 1: Chenggong Rd. (Xiulang Bridge, Xiushan Police Station)
- Exit 2: Section 3 of Xiulang Rd, Jingping Rd.
- Overpass exit: Over Jingping Rd. to the sidewalk next to the reserve headquarters

== Around the station ==
- Xiulang Bridge (200m east of Exit 1)
- Xiushan Park (600m north of Exit 2)
- Xiulang Qingxi Riverside Park (1km southeast of Exit 1)
- De He Traditional Market (1.2km north of Exit 1)
