= Zhonghe Myanmar Street =

Street in Zhonghe, New Taipei, Taiwan

- Burma Street; Little Burma; Myanmar Street; Nanyang Sightseeing Food Street
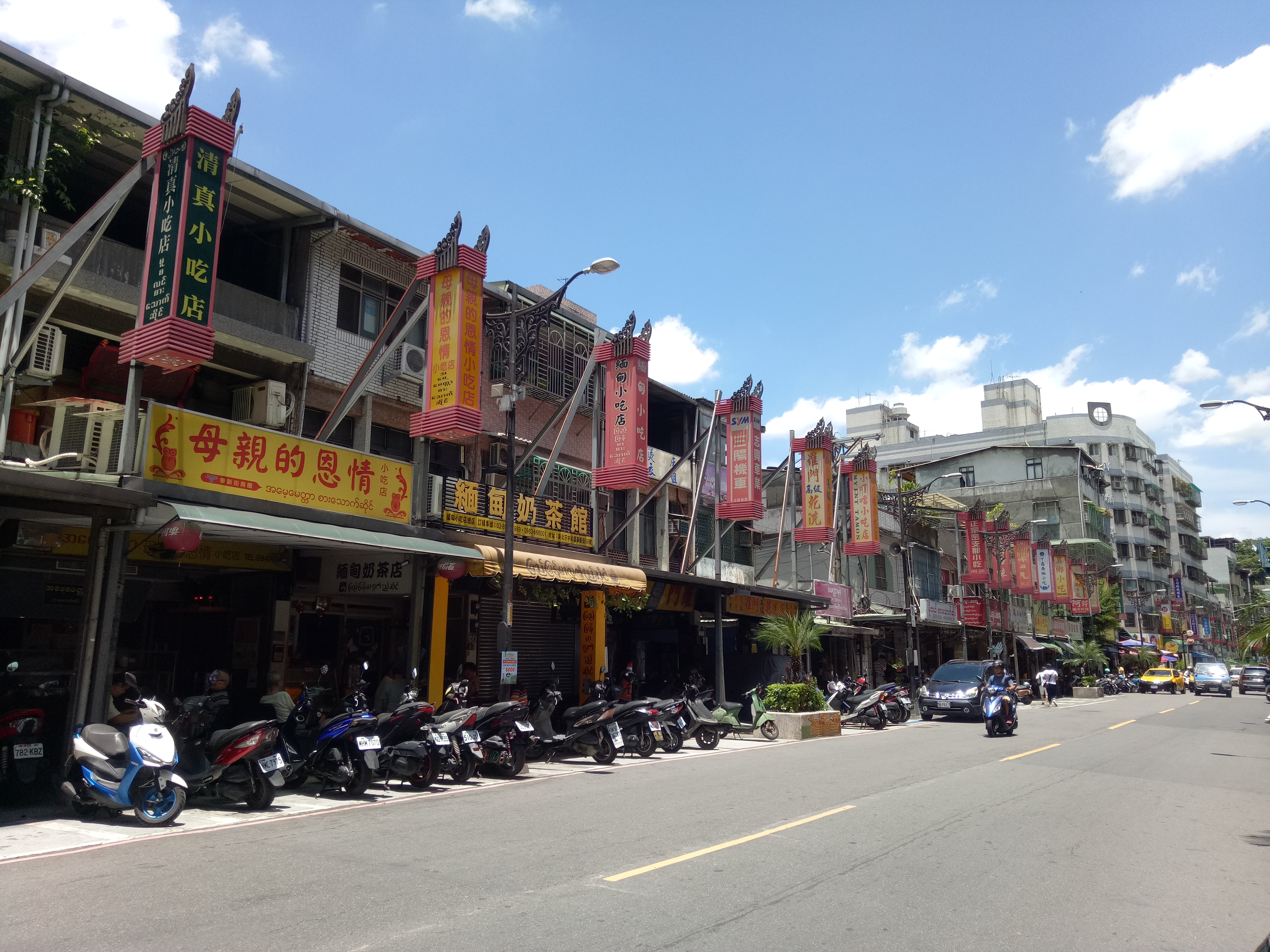
- Interactive map of Zhonghe Myanmar Street
- Native name: 中和緬甸街 (Chinese)
- Type: street
- Location: Zhonghe, New Taipei, Taiwan
- Coordinates: 24°59′02.6″N 121°30′29.0″E

Other
- Known for: Burmese community

The Zhonghe Myanmar Street (Chinese: 中和緬甸街; pinyin: Zhōnghé Miǎndiàn Jiē) is an area name along the Huaxin Street (Chinese: 華新街; pinyin: Huáxīn Jiē) in Zhonghe District, New Taipei, Taiwan.

== History ==
In the 1980s, many descendants of Republic of China Armed Forces migrated to Taiwan from Myanmar and Thailand seeking for a better life. Many of them settled in Zhonghe around this street area. The older generations of these people were the troops stationed in southern China who remained in the country after the end of the Chinese Civil War and the establishment of the People's Republic of China in 1949. Those soldiers waited for Chiang Kai-shek's command, who has fled to Taiwan along with his troops, to retake back the mainland from the People's Liberation Army. Since the retake never happened, some of those troops migrated to Myanmar (then part of British India) and Thailand, and some also repatriated to Taiwan, with thousands more coming in the following decades.

== Architecture ==
There are a few little Burmese temples along the street.

== Demographics ==
There are estimated around 40,000 Burmese-descendant people reside around the street area. It is the largest community of Chinese Burmese people outside Myanmar.

== Business ==
The street is filled with many Burmese cuisine restaurants.

== Gallery ==
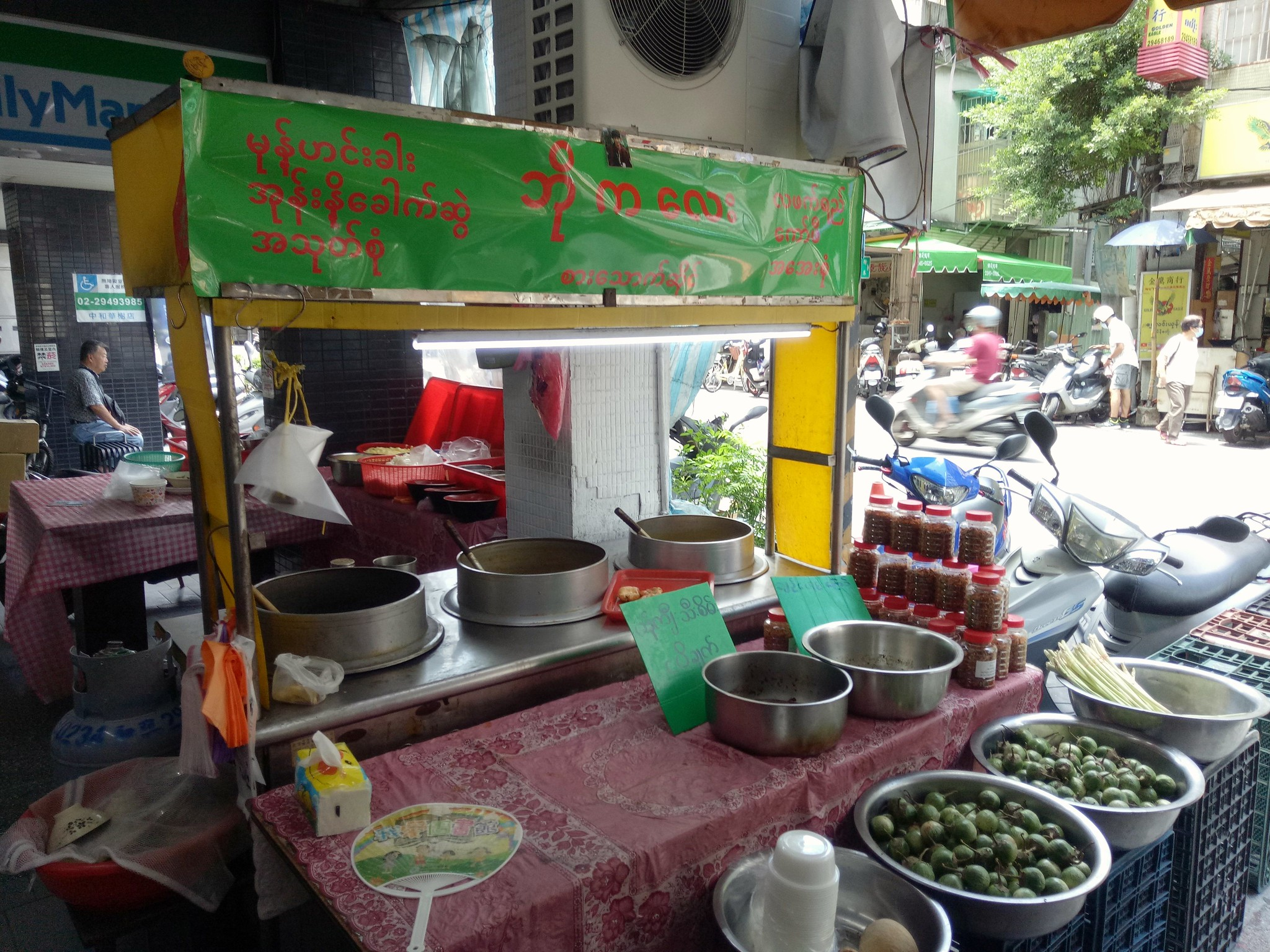
Burmese food vendor at Huaxin Street

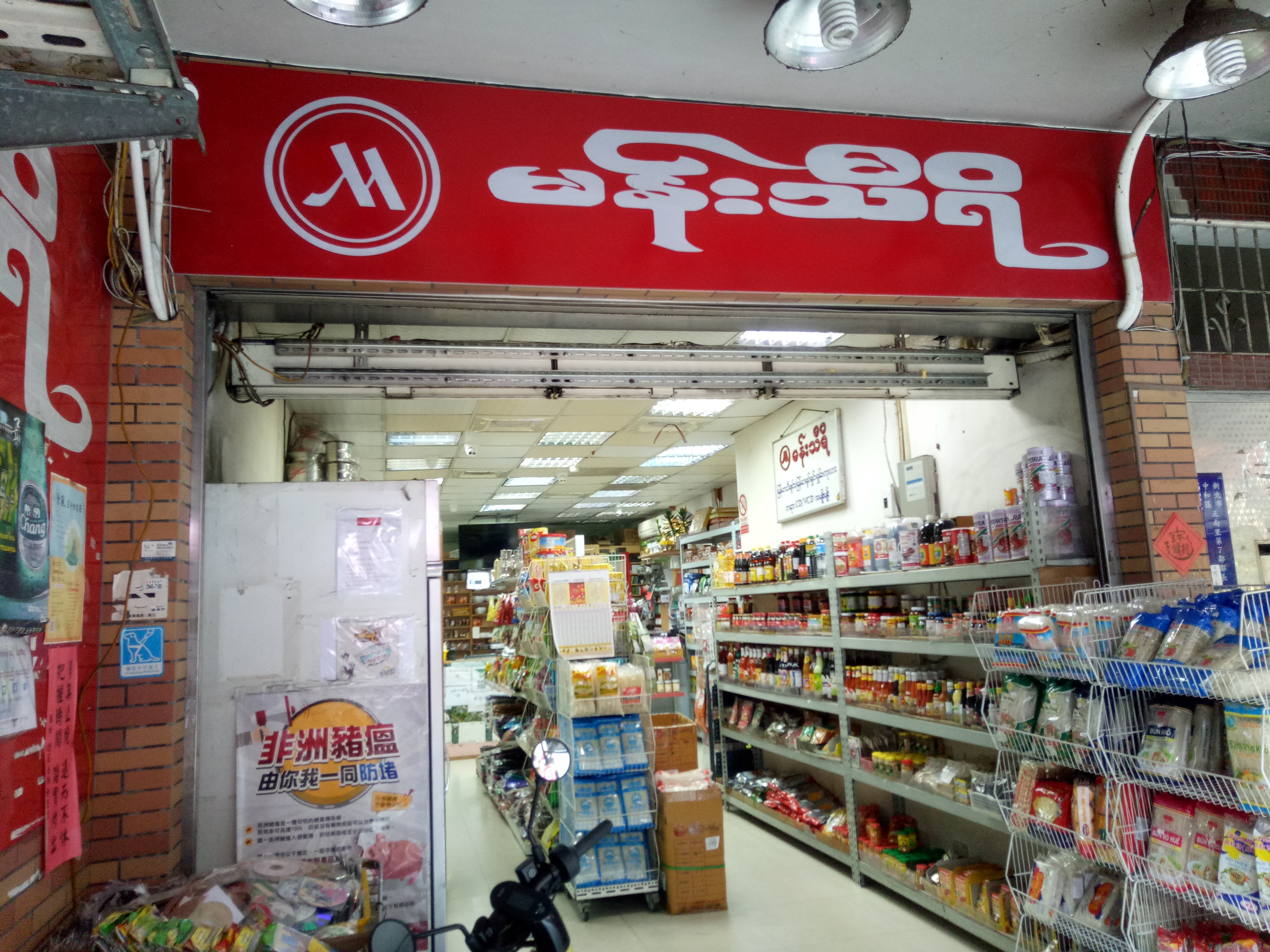
Burmese grocery store "Manthiri"

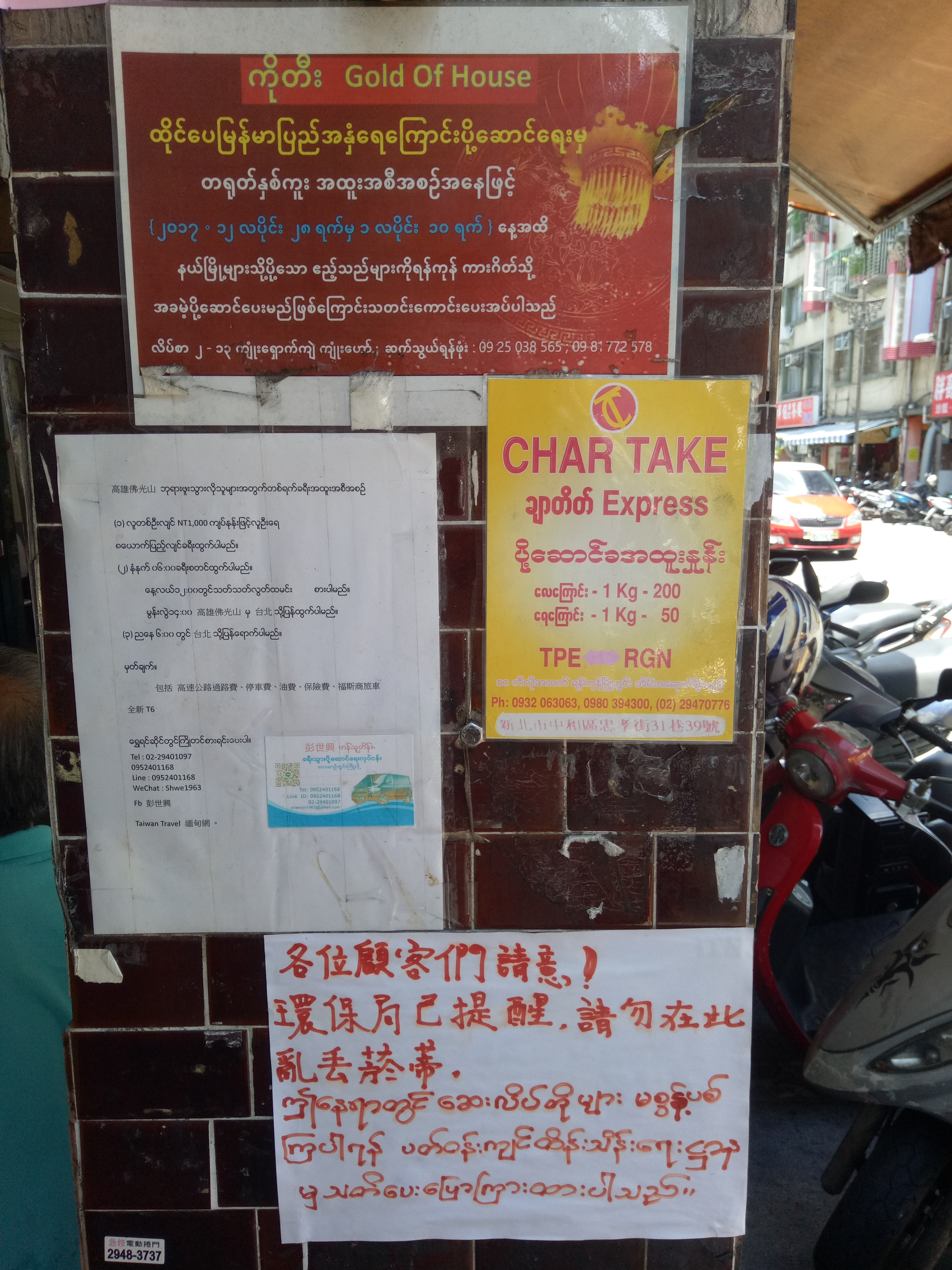
Chinese-Burmese bilingual sign

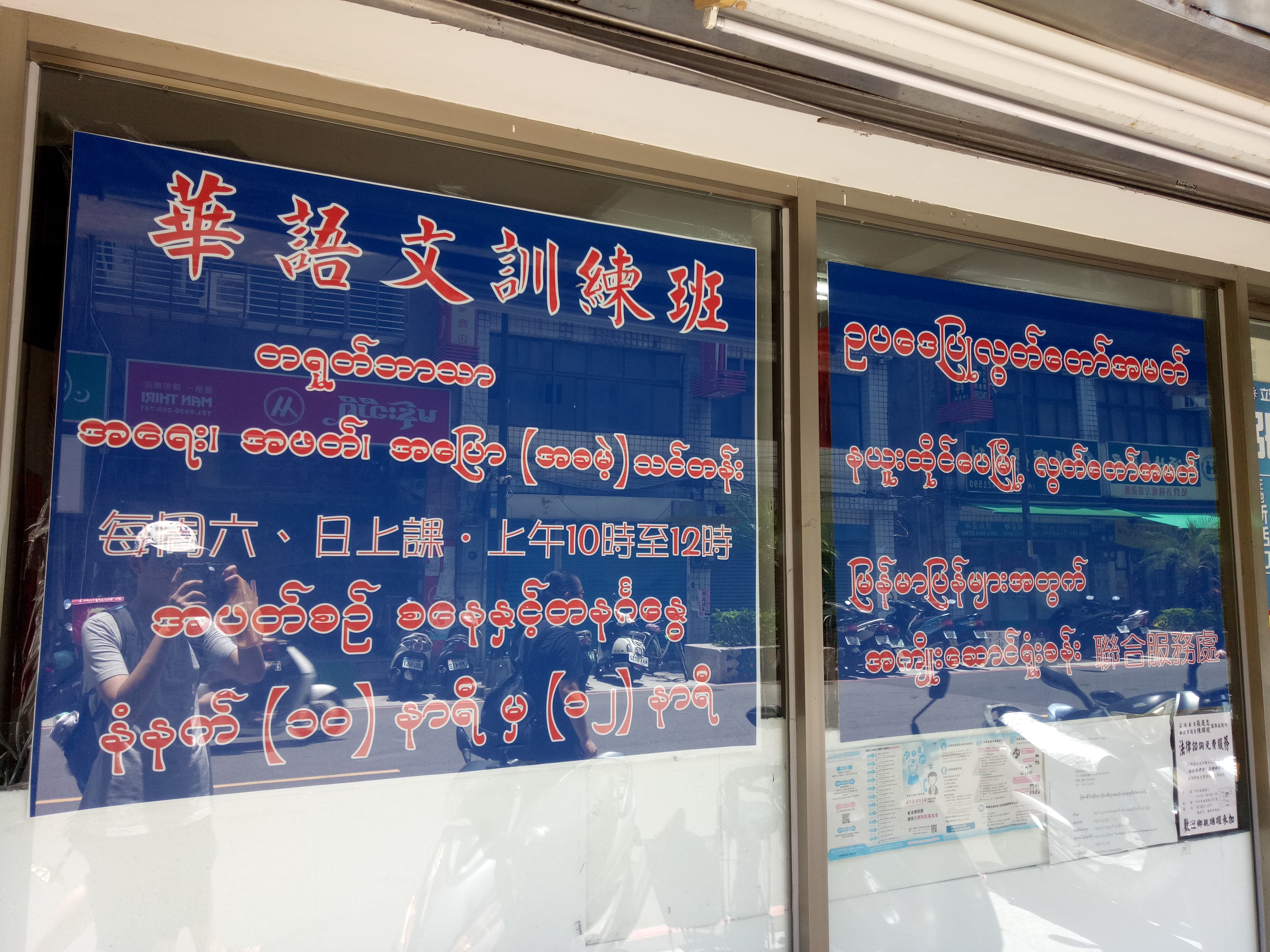
Chinese-Burmese bilingual sign (2)

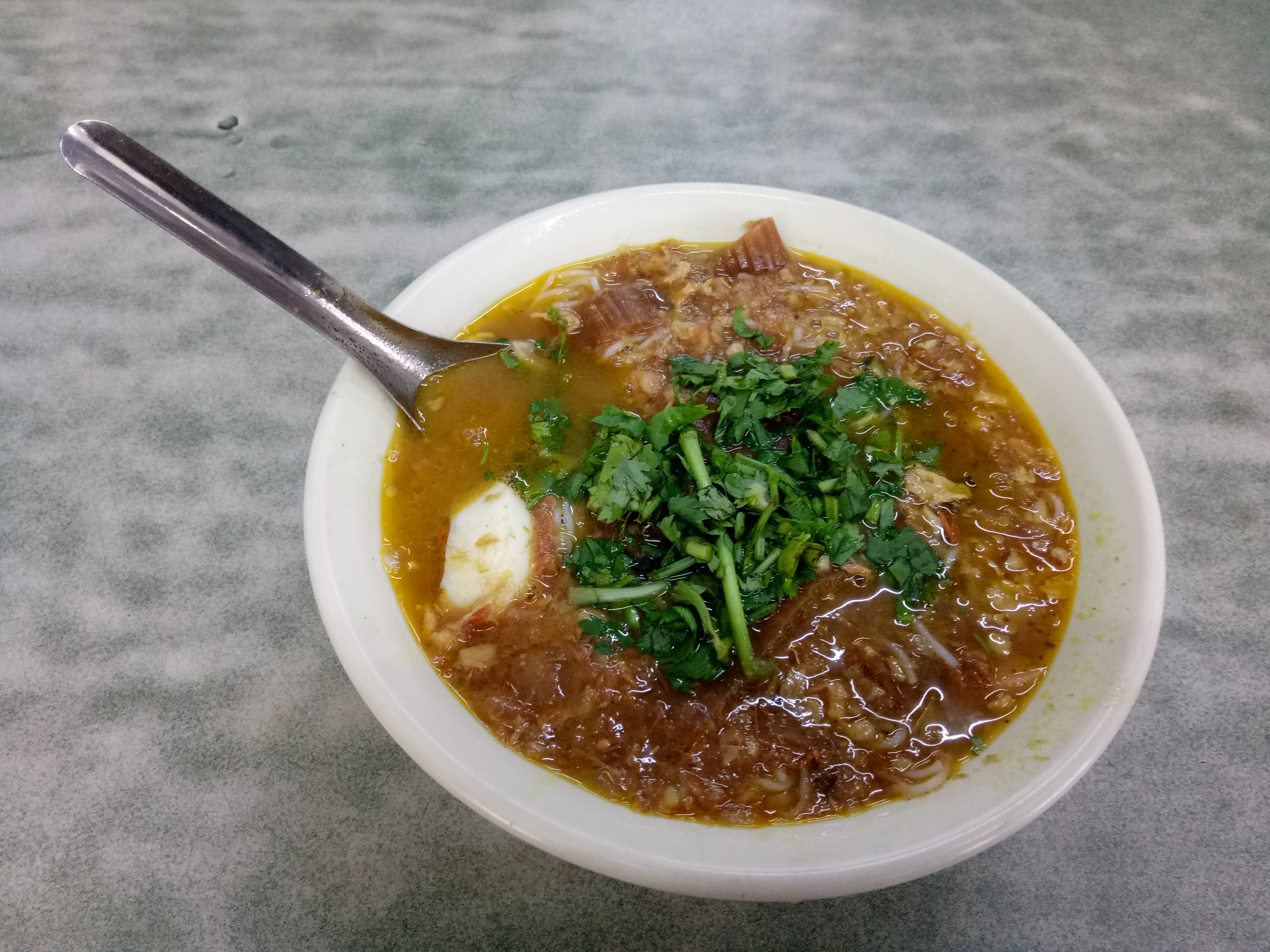
The traditional Burmese dish "Mohinga"

== Activities ==
The street is the venue for the annual Thingyan festival.

== Transportation ==
The area is accessible within walking distance south of Nanshijiao Station of Taipei Metro.

== See also ==
- Islam in Taiwan
