= Zhonghe District =

District in New Taipei, Taiwan

Zhonghe 中和區 Chūwa, Jhonghe
- District
- Zhonghe District
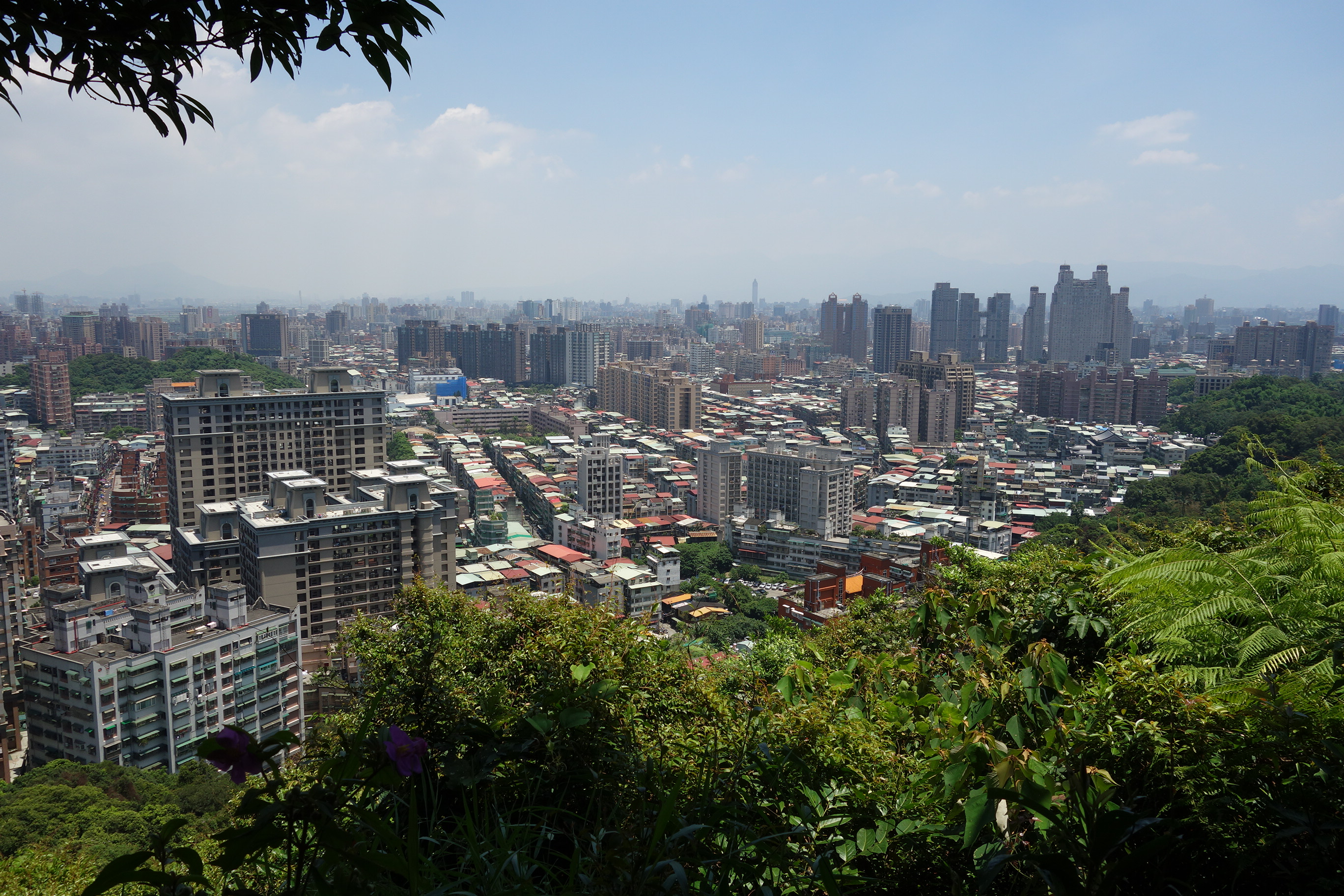

- Location of Zhonghe in New Taipei City
- Coordinates: 24°59′50″N 121°30′15″E
- Country: Taiwan
- Region: Northern Taiwan
- Special municipality: New Taipei City (新北市)

Area
  - Total: 20.294 km^{2} (7.836 sq mi)

Population (October 2026)
  - Total: 401,744
- Time zone: UTC+8 (TST)
- Postal code: 235
- Website: www.zhonghe.ntpc.gov.tw (in Chinese)

Zhonghe District
- Chinese: 中和區
Transcriptions
Standard Mandarin
- Hanyu Pinyin: Zhōnghé Qū
- Bopomofo: ㄓㄨㄥ ㄏㄜˊ ㄑㄩ
- Gwoyeu Romatzyh: Jongher Chiu
- Tongyong Pinyin: Jhonghé Cyu
- MPS2: Jūnghé Chiu
Hakka
- Romanization: Zung^{1}-fo^{2} Sii^{5}
Yue: Cantonese
- Jyutping: zong^{1} wo^{4} si^{5}
Southern Min
- Hokkien POJ: Tiong-hô Khu

Zhonghe District (Chinese: 中和區; Hanyu Pinyin: Zhōnghé Qū; Tongyong Pinyin: Jhonghé Cyu, Pe̍h-ōe-jī: Tiong-hô Khu), also spelled Jhonghe, is an inner city district in New Taipei City in northern Taiwan (ROC).

Zhonghe was founded in 1946 as an urban township in what then known as Taipei County in, until it gained county-administered city status in 1979 and again as a district of New Taipei in 2010.

== Geography and climate ==
Zhonghe lies just south-west of Taipei City and shares borders with Banqiao, Xindian, Tucheng and Yonghe Districts of New Taipei City, as well as Taipei City. The average annual temperature is 21.7 °C (71.1 °F) and the precipitation averages 2,111 millimetres (83.1 in) per year. Most of Zhonghe lies a few tens of meters above sea level and is heavily urbanized, with forested hillier country in the southeast. A mountainous ridge forms most of the eastern border with Xindian, which includes the highest point in Zhonghe, the 302-meter Fenglusai (Chinese: 風爐塞山; pinyin: Fēnglúsài Shān).

== History ==
The present-day area of Zhonghe District was originally settled by aboriginal tribes. During conflict between the colonial forces of the Dutch and the Spanish, the area is recorded by the Dutch as Chiron, from the name of one of the tribes living there. This name is preserved in one of the constituent villages of the city, called Xiulangli (秀朗里), and the bridge which connects Zhonghe and Xindian.

The area was subsequently settled by Han Chinese migrants from China but remained relatively unimportant until the end of the Second World War. Under Japanese rule, Zhonghe was known as Chūwa.

=== After Second World War ===
In 1946, the population of the area of present-day Zhonghe and Yonghe was 30,000 and it was classified as a rural township. Due to rapid population growth Yonghe was separated from Zhonghe in 1958. Subsequently, on 1 January 1979, Zhonghe was upgraded to county-administered city status after reaching a population of 170,000. On 25 December 2010, due to the changing from Taipei County to New Taipei City, Zhonghe City was changed to Zhonghe District.

== Administrative divisions ==
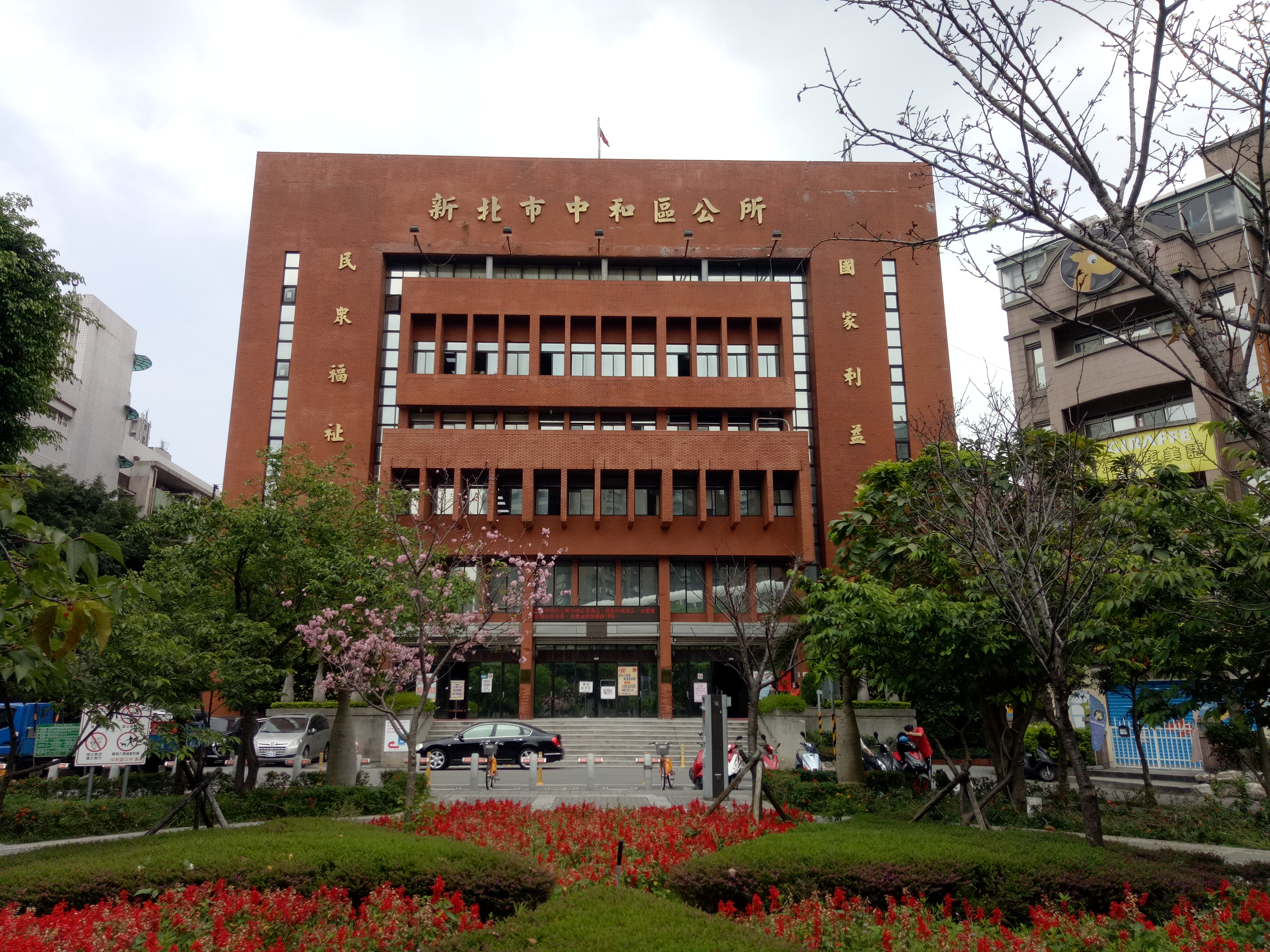
Zhonghe District Office

Zhonghe is divided into 93 villages, which are further subdivided into lin (鄰; 'neighbourhoods'), of which there are 2,972 in total. Some administration is shared with neighbouring Yonghe District; due to both this and their proximity, they are sometimes collectively known as Shuanghe (雙和; 'Twin He'). This is also reflected in the names of various institutions such as Shuang-Ho Hospital in Zhonghe and Shuanghe Libai Church in Yonghe District.

== Transportation ==
=== Rail ===
Zhonghe is served by the Zhonghe–Xinlu line and the Circular line of the New Taipei Metro. Three metro stations of the Zhonghe–Xinlu line are located in Zhonghe: Yongan Market, Jingan, and the terminal station, Nanshijiao. Six metro stations of the Circular line, Xiulang Bridge, Jingping, Jingan, Zhonghe, Qiaohe, and Zhongyuan are located in Zhonghe as well. Jingan Station is an interchange station between the Circular line and Zhonghe-Xinlu lines. In the future, the Wanda–Zhonghe–Shulin line and the north–south section of the Circular line will eventually bring the number of MRT stations in Zhonghe to fifteen. The closest regular rail and high-speed services are from Banqiao station in neighbouring Banqiao District.

=== Road ===
Zhonghe has an interchange on one of Taiwan's two main north–south road arteries; the National Highway 3. Also providing road links is Provincial Highway 64, an elevated expressway that cuts through the middle of the district, with several on and off-ramps in Zhonghe itself. There are two bridges over the Xindian River; Xiulang Bridge, which connects Zhonghe with Xindian, and Huazhong Bridge, reaching Taipei's Wanhua District.

== Parks and attractions ==
- Jinhe Sports Park
- Dinosaur Park

== Education ==
Zhonghe is home to the National Taiwan Library, which is located in the grounds of the 8-23 Memorial Park. It has one of the best collections in Taiwan of factual books about Taiwan in English.

There are nine elementary schools, five junior high schools, four senior high schools (2 public and 2 private high schools) in Zhonghe. The National Taiwan University of Science and Technology is also located in the city.

- Zhonghe Elementary School
- Guangfu Elementary School
- Fuxing Elementary School
- Jingxin Elementary School
- Xiushan Elementary School
- Jisui Elementary School
- Ziqiang Elementary School
- Xingnan Elementary School
- Jinhe Elementary School
- Zhonghe Junior High School
- Zhanghe Junior High School
- Jisui Junior High School
- Ziqiang Junior High School
- Jinhe High School
- Jinhe High School
- Chung Ho Senior High School
- Private Nanshan Senior High School
- Private Chu-Lin Senior High School

== Economy ==
The offices of a number of technology companies are located in the district, including the Asia-Pacific head office of Viewsonic, SpotCam, a Texas Instruments research facility, the head offices of Cooler Master, and Micro-Star International.

== Cultural and religious sites ==
- Hongludi Temple (烘爐地南山福德宮)
- Yuantong Temple (中和圓通寺)
- Xingnan Night Market (中和興南夜市)
- Fangliao Night Market

=== Burma Street ===
Zhonghe Myanmar Street or Burma Street, near Nanshijiao metro station, is home to a large proportion of Taiwan's small Burmese immigrant population. Zhonghe District is home to 40,000 Burmese Taiwanese (2008), making up 10% of Zhonghe's population, and constituting one of the largest communities of Burmese Taiwanese outside of Burma. Consequently, there are numerous stores and restaurants in this area selling Burmese produce and there are also cultural events on occasion.

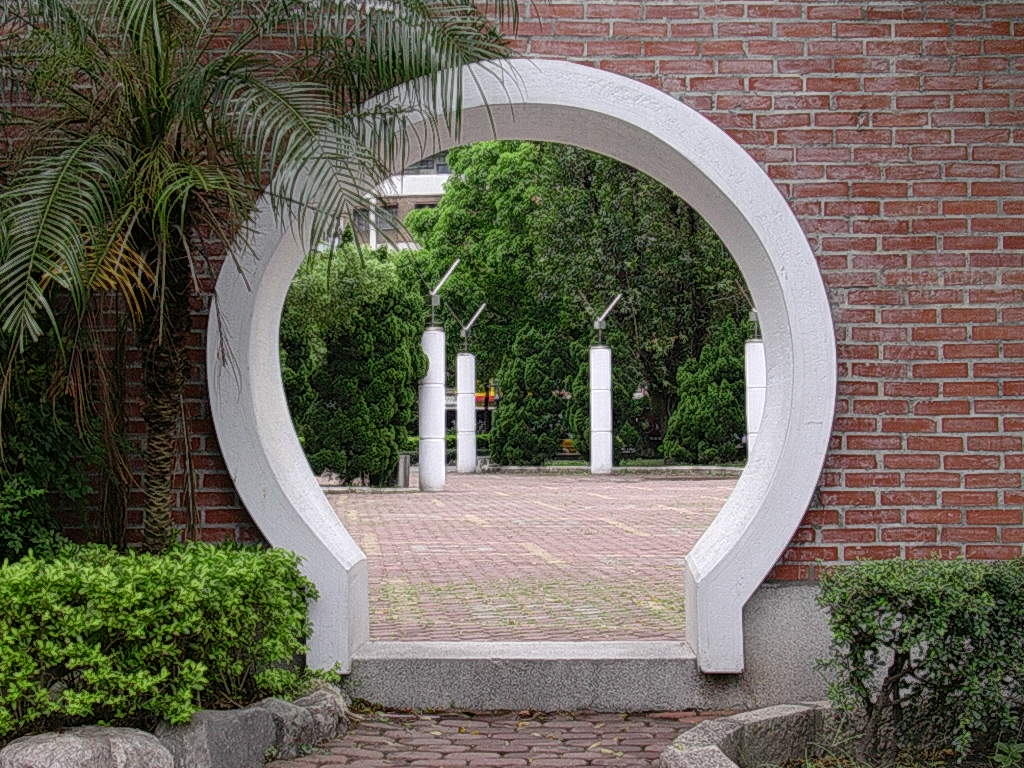
Archway in the 8-23 Park

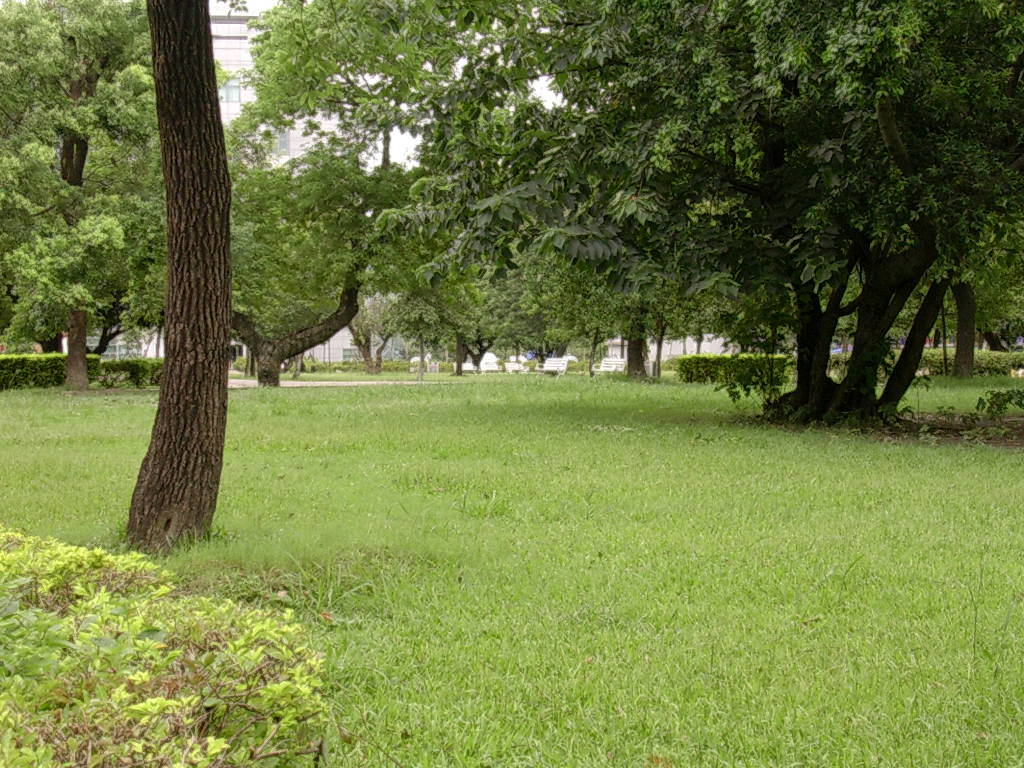
Trees in the 8-23 Park

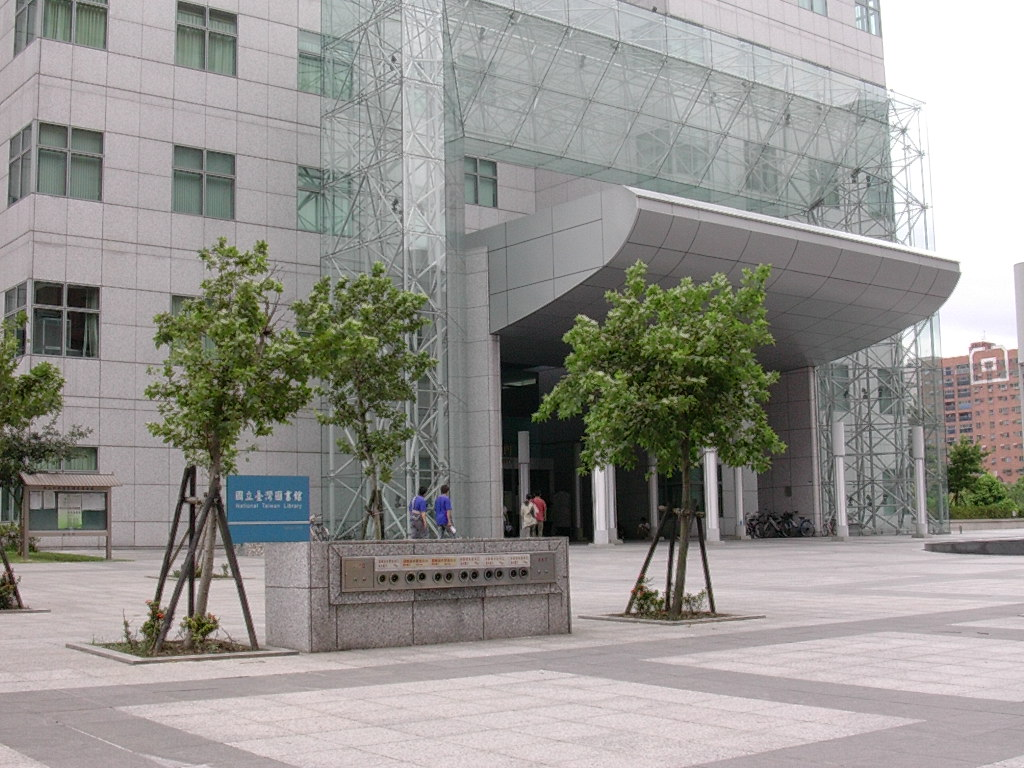
National Taiwan Library

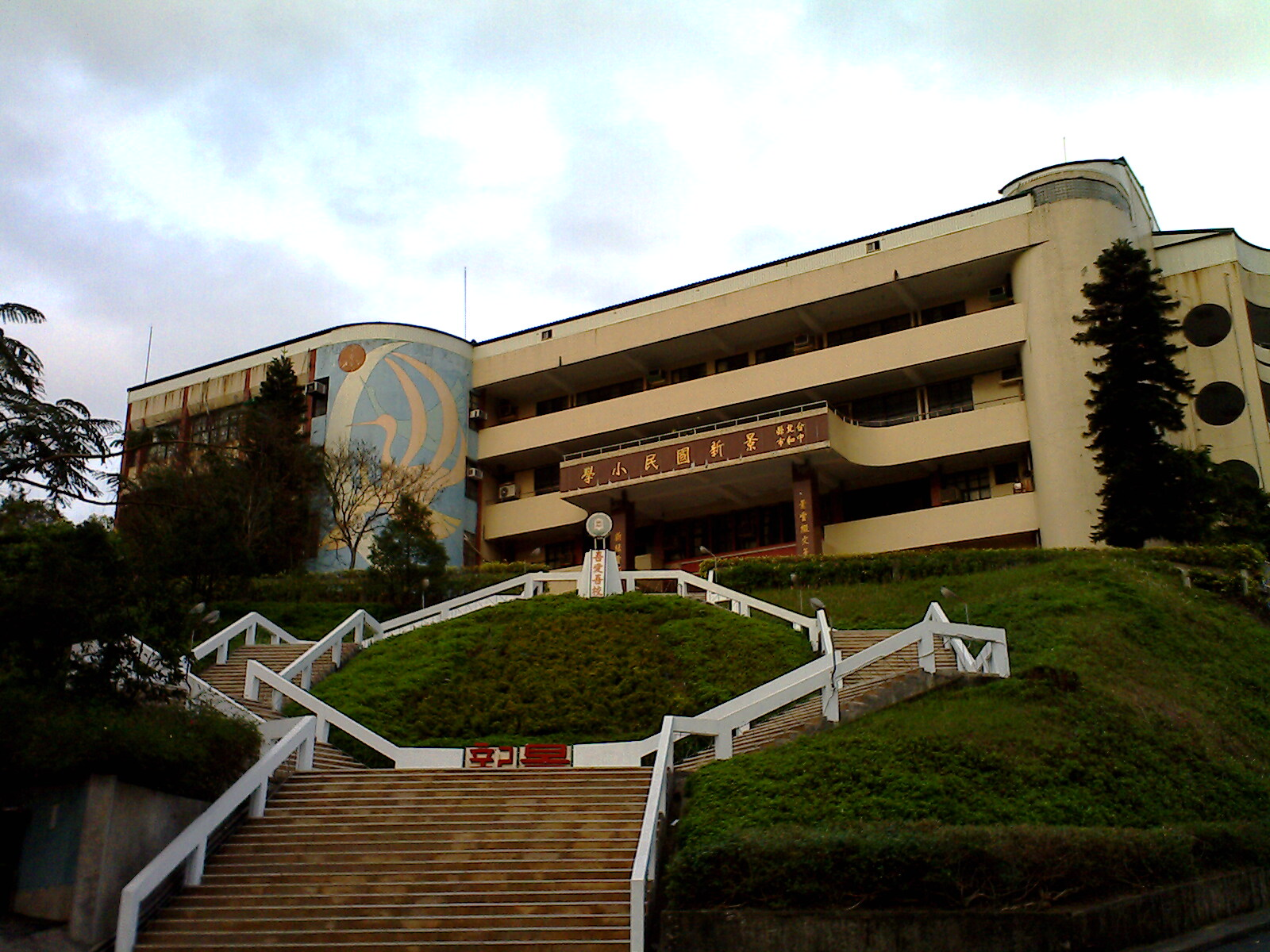
Jingxin Elementary School

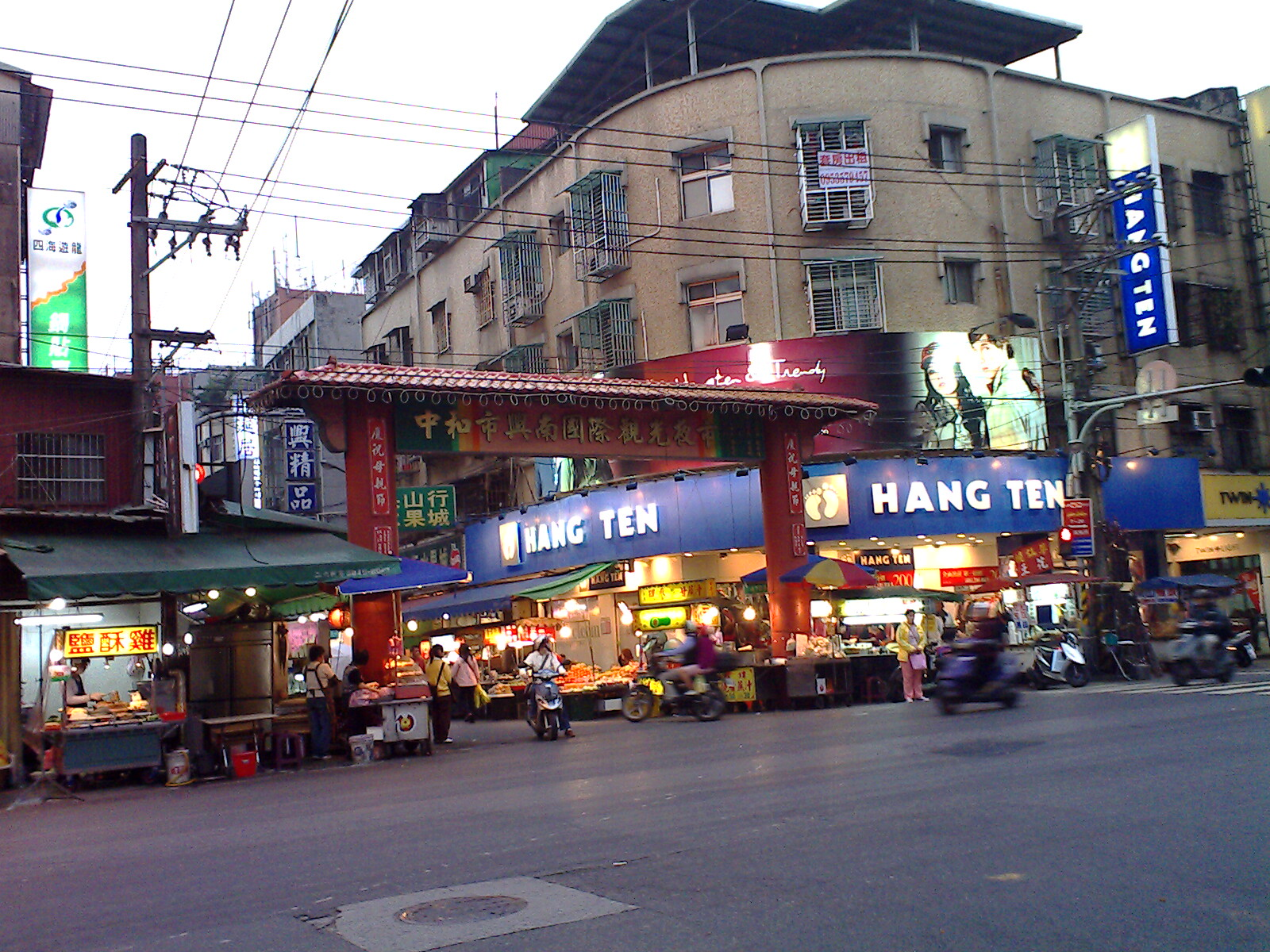
Xingnan Night Market Entrance

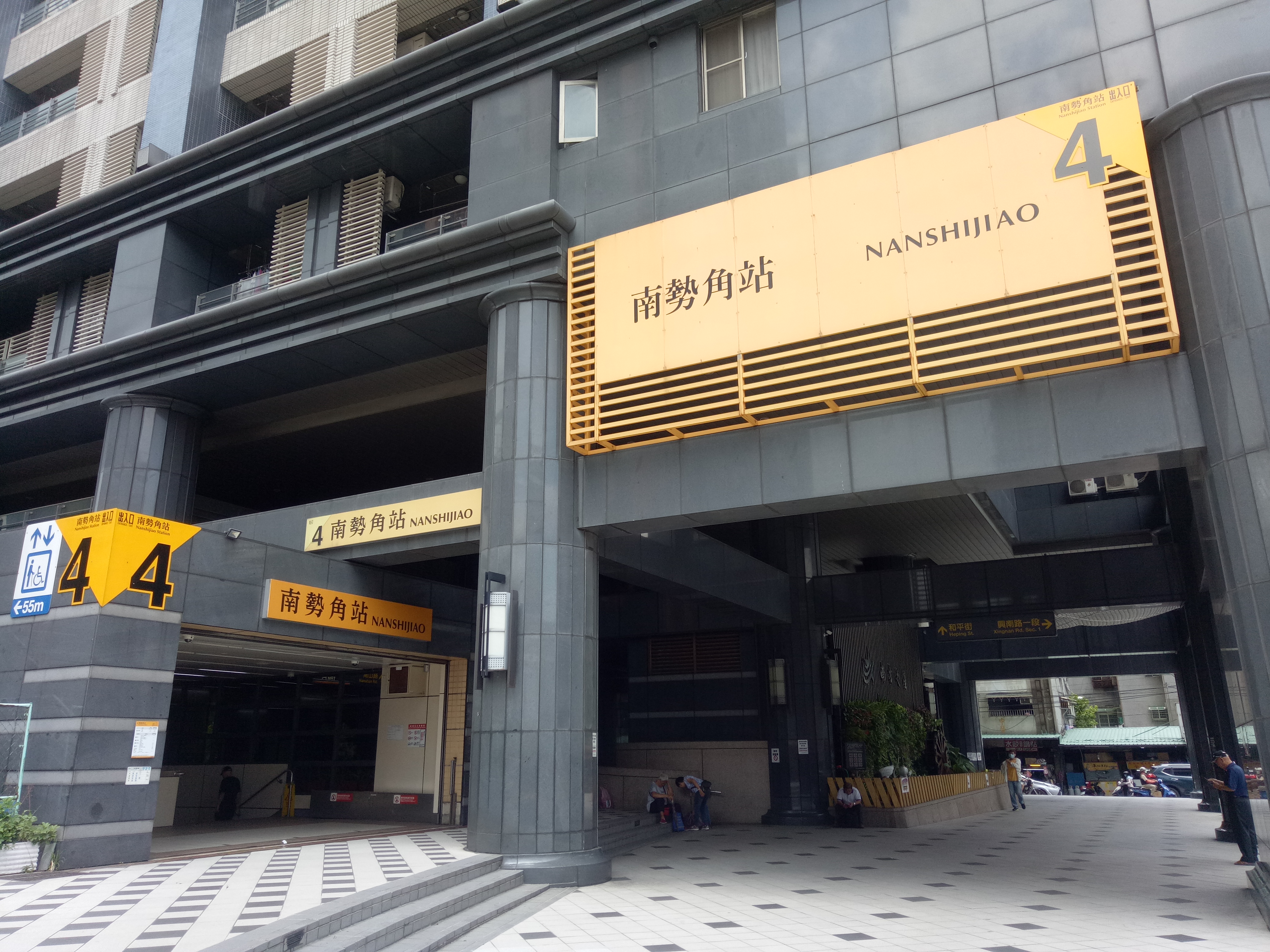
Nanshijiao Station

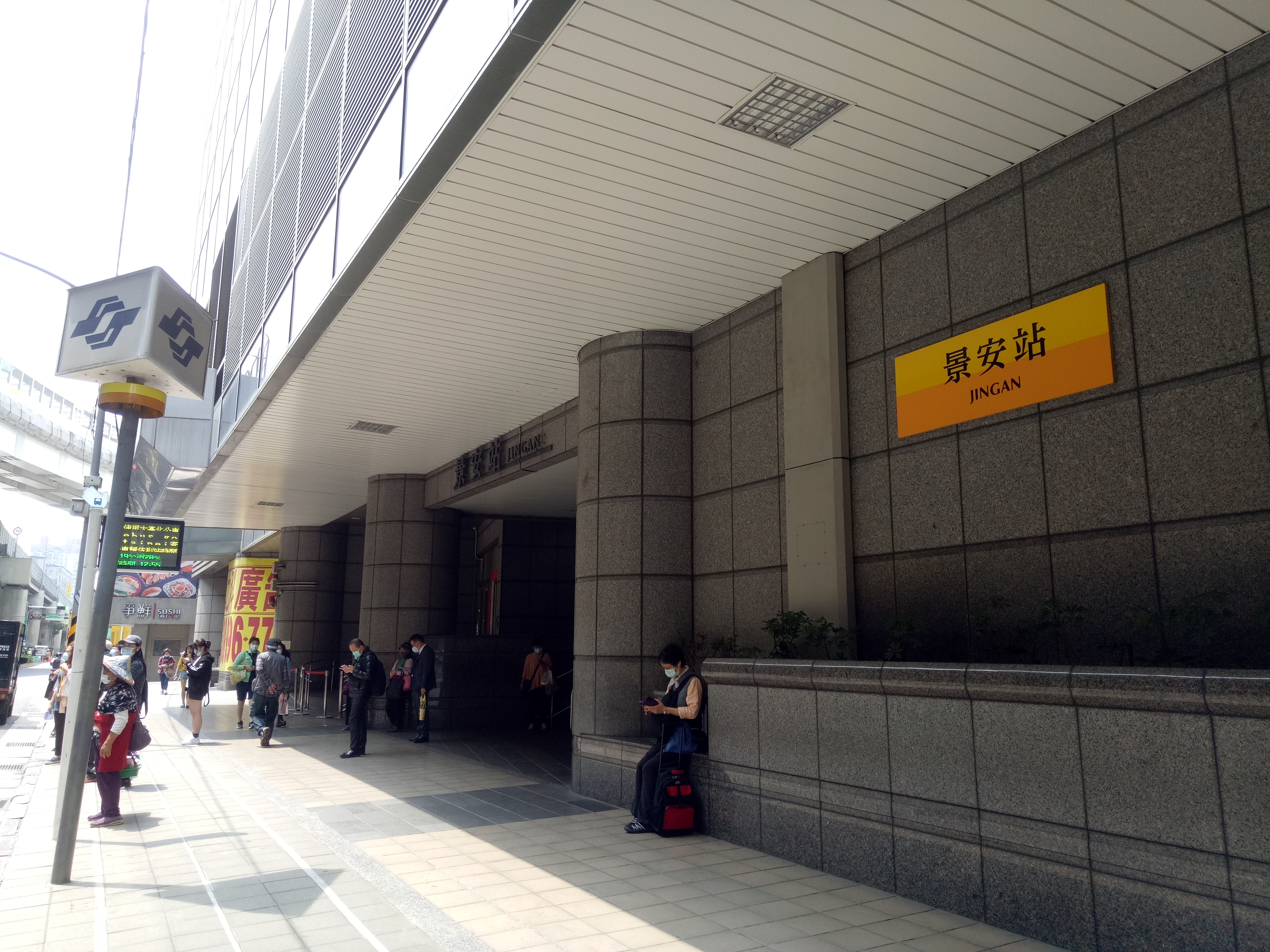
Jingan Station

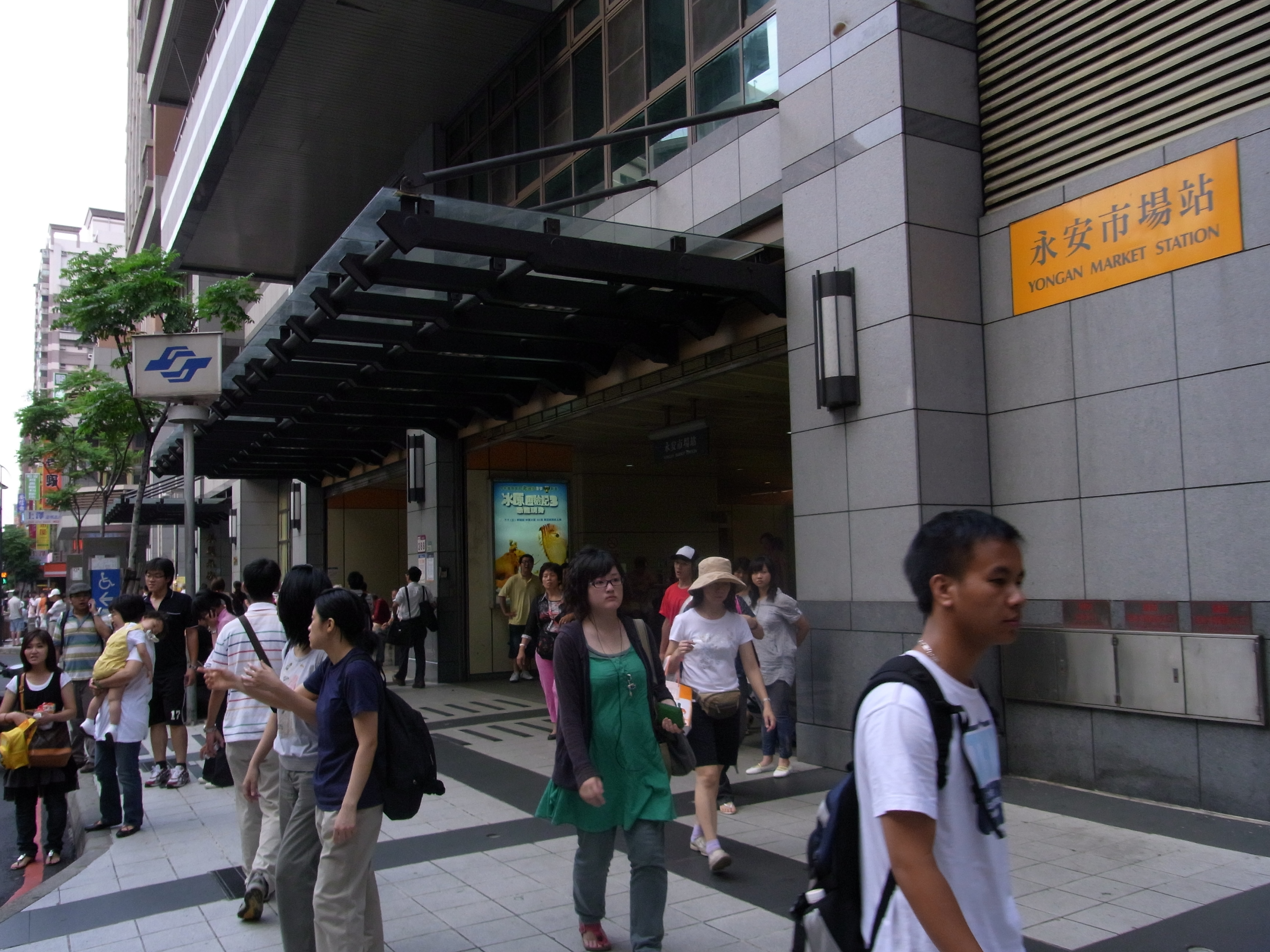
Yongan Market Station

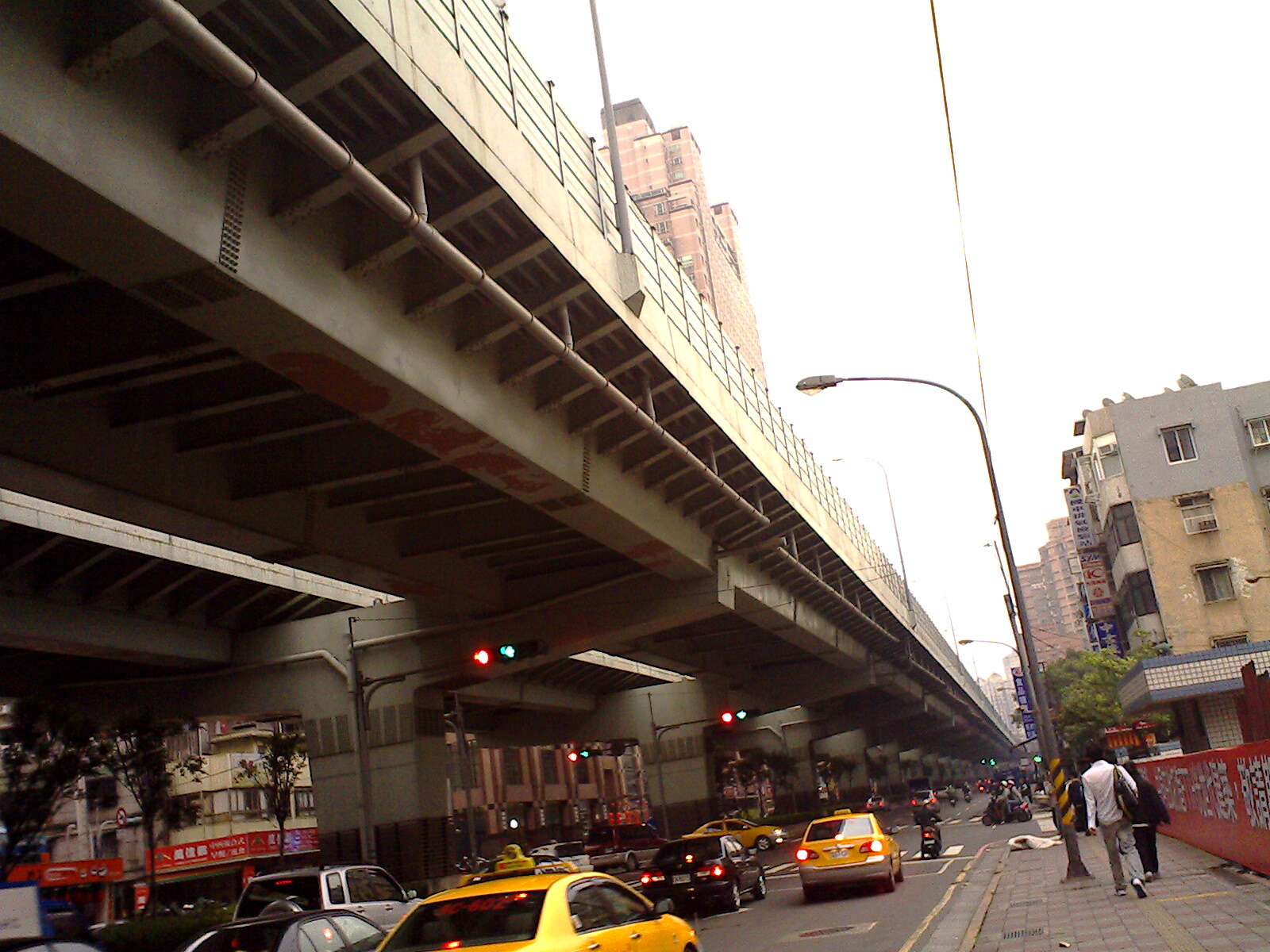
Jingping Road

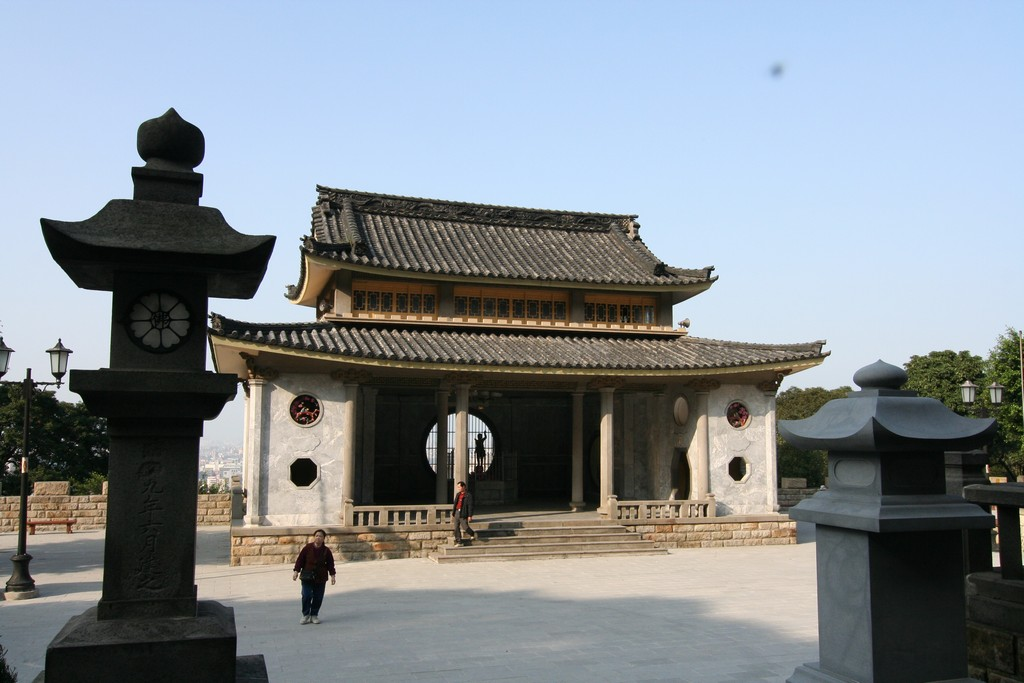
Yuantong Temple (Buddhist)

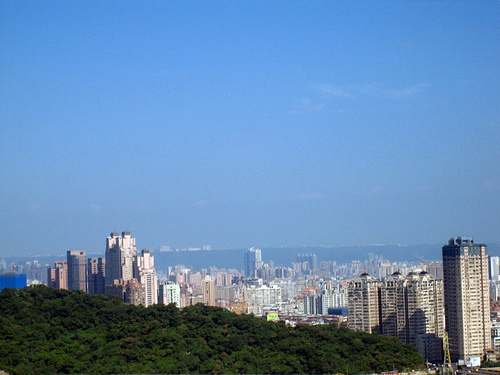
High-rise buildings

== Famous natives ==
- Lin Ching-i - women's volleyball player

== Twin towns ==
Zhonghe, Taiwan is twinned with:

- Los Gatos, California, United States
