= National Taiwan Library =

Public library in Zhonghe, New Taipei, Taiwan

- 國立臺灣圖書館
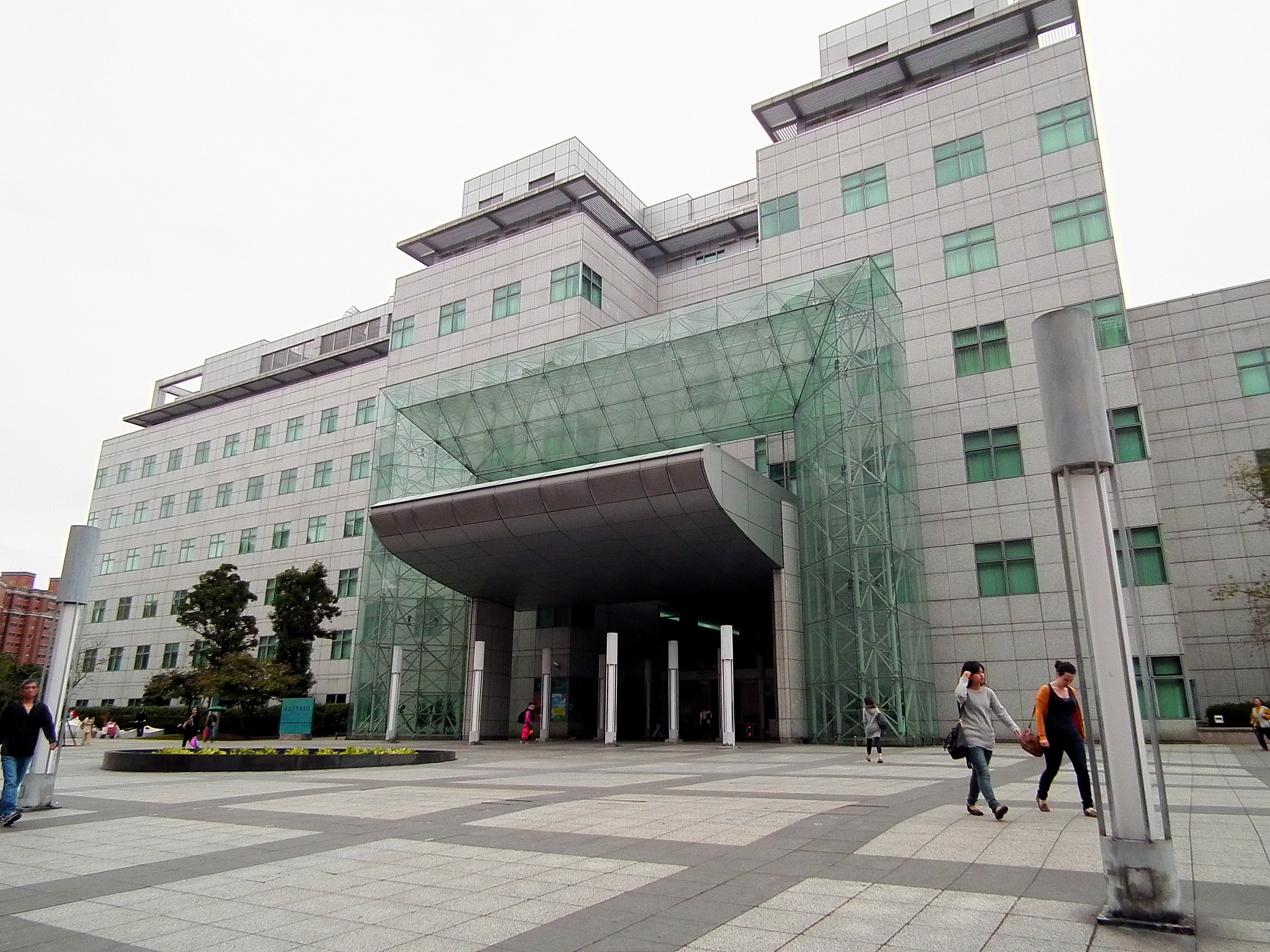
- 25.001°N 121.512°E
- Location: Zhonghe, New Taipei, Taiwan
- Type: Public library
- Established: 1914

Other information
- Director: 曹翠英
- Website: www.ntl.edu.tw

The National Taiwan Library (Chinese: 國立臺灣圖書館) is a library in Zhonghe District, New Taipei, Taiwan. It is the oldest public library in Taiwan. Founded in 1914, the library is home to a large collection of documents concerning the history, culture, politics and geography of Taiwan.

== History ==
The library was founded in 1914 during the Japanese colonial period as the Imperial Taiwan Library (Kyūjitai; 臺灣總督府圖書館) on the order of governor Sakuma Samata. The library's first permanent home on Bo'ai Road (博愛路) in Taipei was destroyed in an Allied bombing raid during World War II.

After the Nationalists took over control of the island following Japan's defeat in World War II, the library was renamed the Taiwan Provincial Library (Chinese: 臺灣省圖書館) and moved to temporary accommodation.

In 1947, it was again renamed, this time to Taiwan Provincial Taipei Library (Chinese: 臺灣省立臺北圖書館) and it was under this name that the library was relocated to Xinsheng South Road (新生南路) in 1963.

In 2007, Huang Wen-ling was appointed as the twentieth director of the National Taiwan Library, and the first woman to hold the post.

The current name of the library was chosen in 2013, with the full official title being National Taiwan Library (Chinese: 國立臺灣圖書館).

== Collection ==
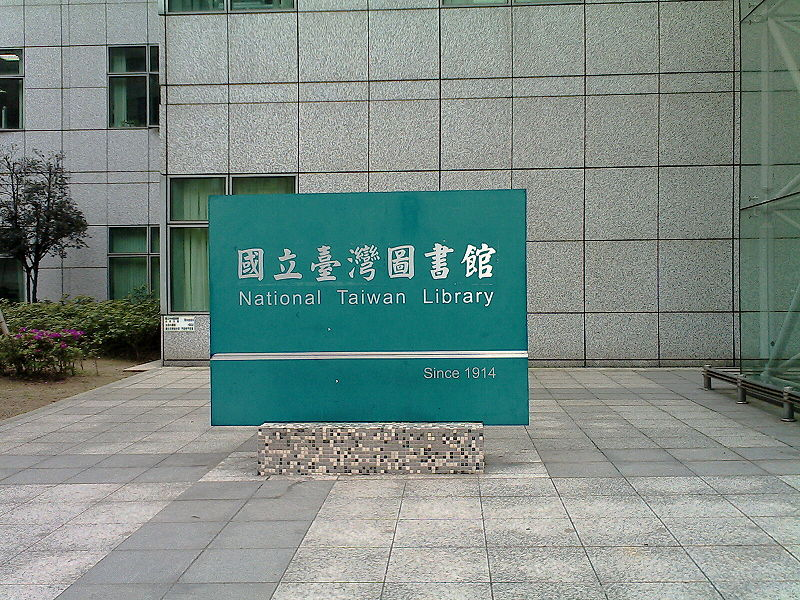
Sign indicating the library

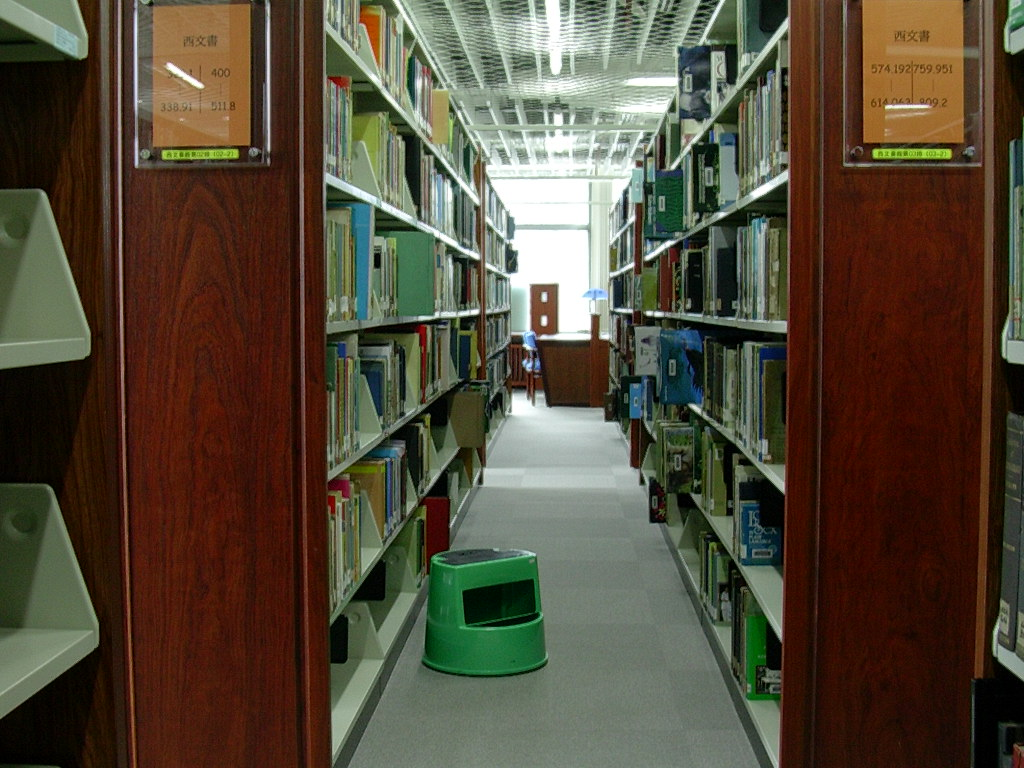
Foreign language section of the library

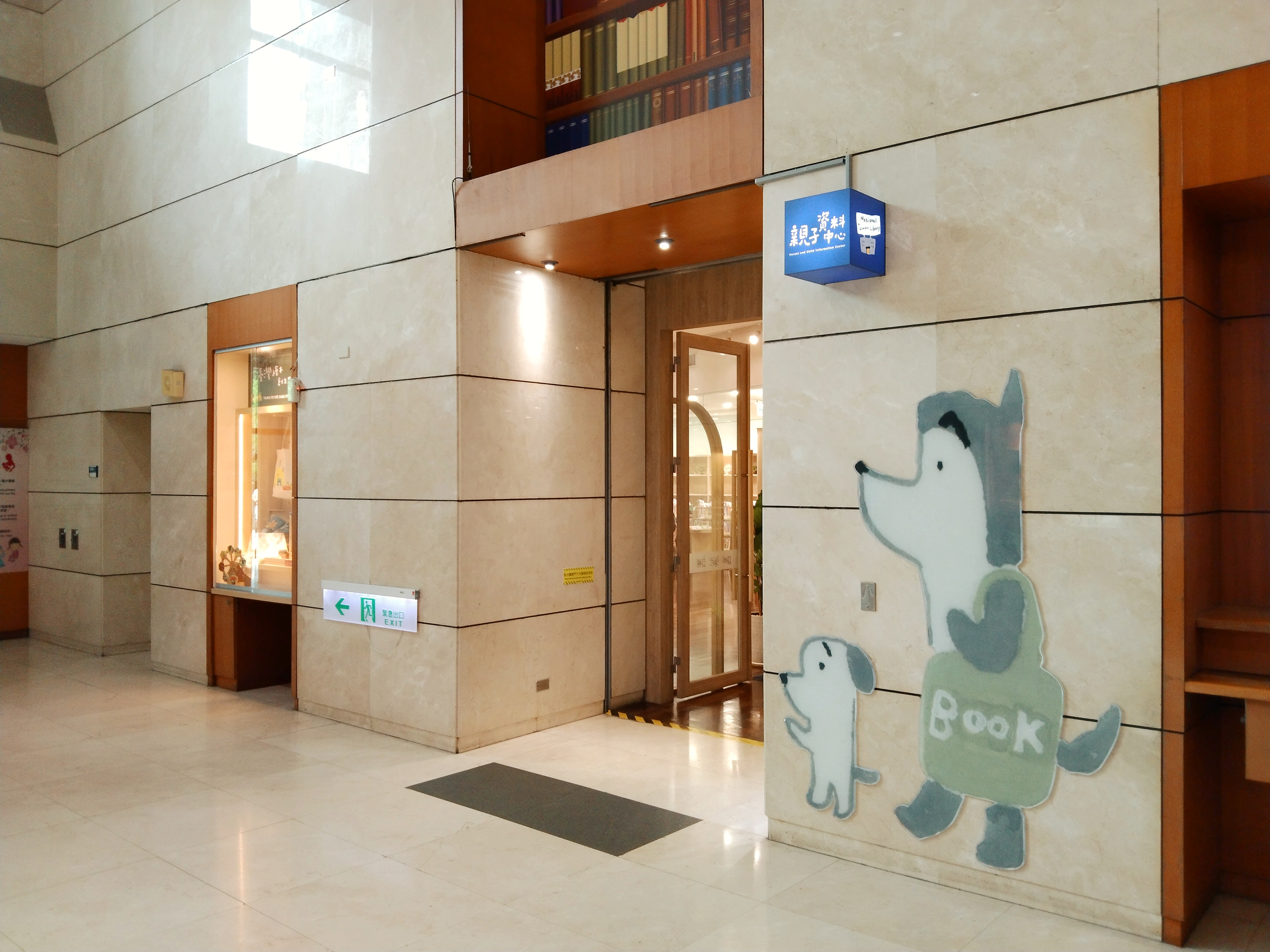
Parent and Child Information Center

The library is home to a large collection of documents related to Taiwan. There are 210,000 documents from the Japanese era (1895–1945) and the collection has been continuously added to since then. The library's aim is to provide a dedicated research centre for people interested in Taiwan Studies, offering traditional written material sources as well as information resources for researchers to locate the documents or information needed.

Services for the visually impaired are also a key focus for the institution, with a collection of 12,000 Braille books together with information technology resources for readers.

== Conservation ==
A pioneer of book conservation techniques in Taiwan, the library is now home to a dedicated "Book Hospital" which serves not only as a centre for restoration of old books, but also a location for staff from other institutions to learn the craft.

== See also ==
- Academia Sinica
