= Jingping metro station =

Metro station in New Taipei, Taiwan

Jingping 景平
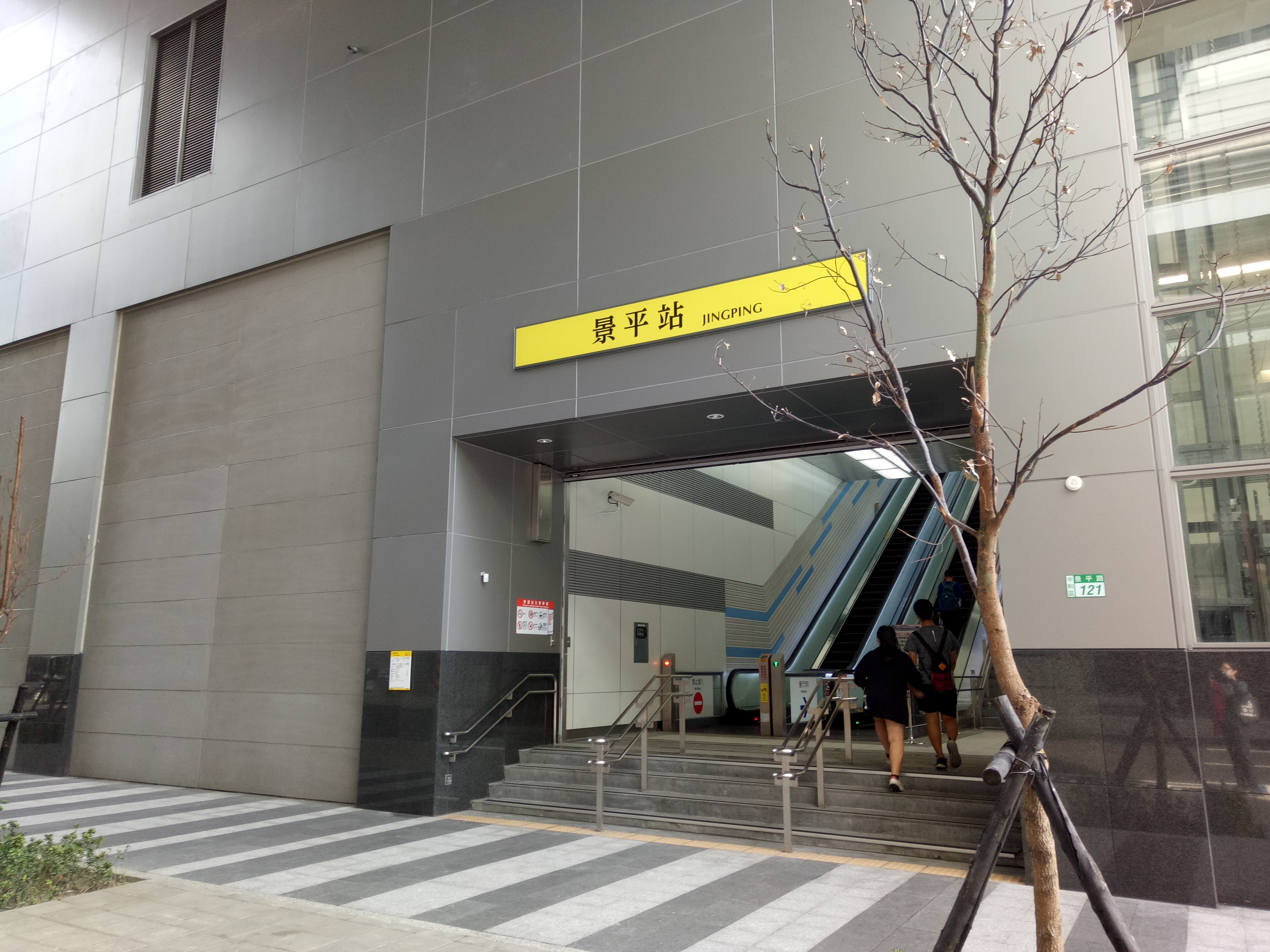
- The exit of Jingping Station

General information
- Location: No.121, Jingping Rd. Zhonghe, New Taipei; Taiwan
- Coordinates: 24.9921358°N 121.5160901°E
- Operated by: New Taipei Metro
- Line: Circular line (Y10)
- Connections: Bus stop

Construction
- Structure type: Elevated

Other information
- Station code: Y10

History
- Opened: 31 January 2020

Services
| Preceding station | New Taipei Metro | Following station |
|---|---|---|
| Xiulang Bridge towards Dapinglin | Circular line | Jingan towards NT Industrial Park |
Location

Jingping station is a station on the New Taipei Metro's Circular line when it was opened on 31 January 2020. It is located in Zhonghe District, New Taipei, Taiwan, at the intersection of Jingping Road and Lane 123.

== Station layout ==
| 5F | Connecting level | Platforms-connecting overpass |
| 4F | Side platform, doors will open on the right |
| 4F | Platform 1 | ← Circular line toward New Taipei Industrial Park (Y11 JIngan) |
| 4F | Platform 2 | → Circular line toward Dapinglin (Y09 Xiulang Bridge) → |
| 4F | Side platform, doors will open on the right |
| 4F | Concourse | Lobby, information desk, automatic ticket machines, shops, one-way faregates, restrooms (outside paid area) |

| Street level | Ground level | Entrance/exit |

== Around the station ==
- The Second Special Police Corps HQ (next to the station)
- RT-Mart Zhonghe Store (next to the station)
- Dayong Street Night Market (大勇街黃昏市場) (300m north of the station)
- Daren Street Ziqiang Road Park (大仁街自強路公園) (550m northeast of the station)
- Minzu Street Market (民族街市場) (750m north of the station)
