= Xingtian Temple metro station =

Metro station in Taipei, Taiwan

Xingtian Temple / SB03 行天宮
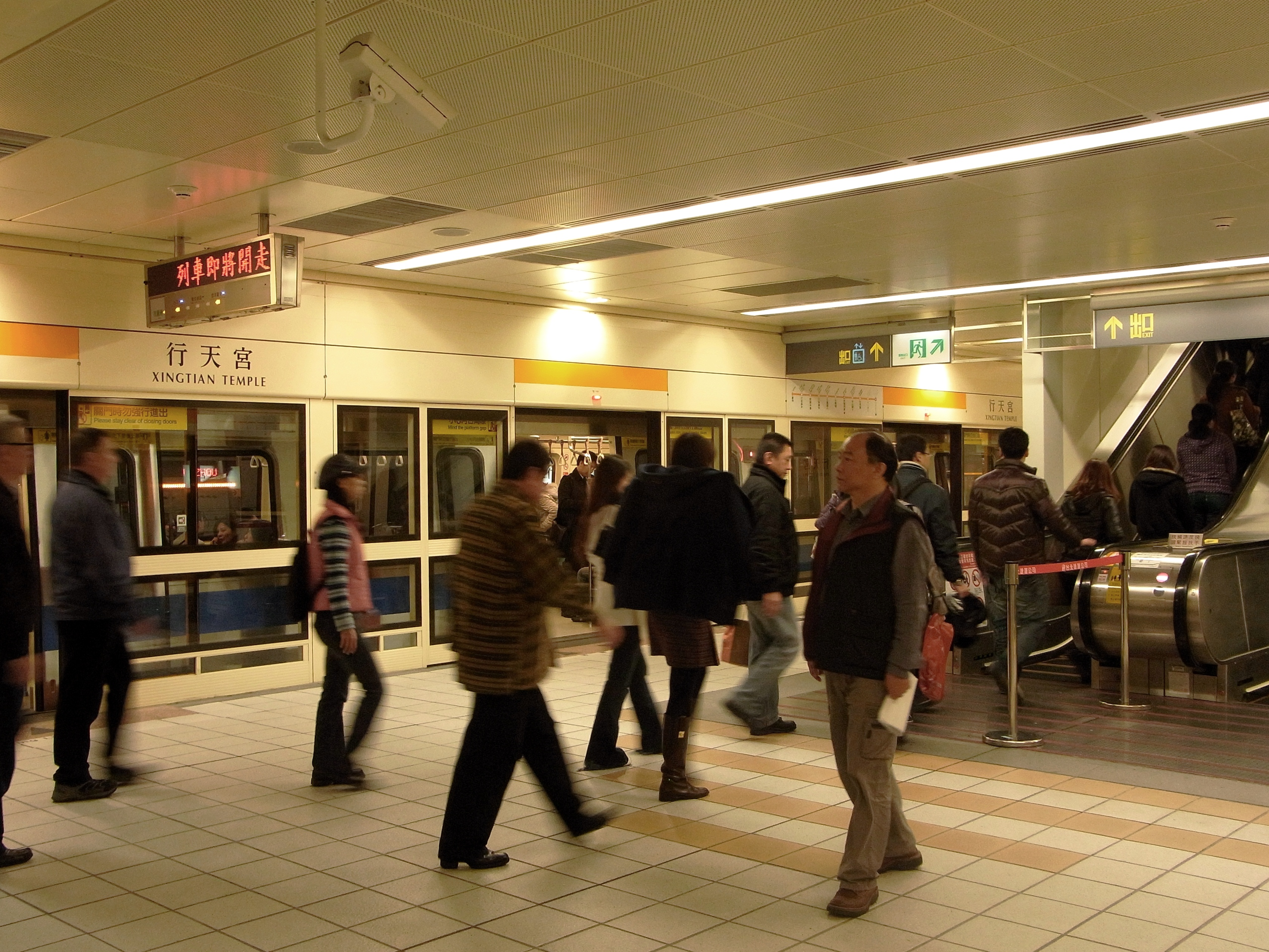
- Platform

Chinese name
- Traditional Chinese: 行天宮
- Simplified Chinese: 行天宫
Transcriptions
Standard Mandarin
- Hanyu Pinyin: Xíngtiān Gōng
- Bopomofo: ㄒㄧㄥˊ ㄊㄧㄢ ㄍㄨㄥ
- Wade–Giles: Hsing²-t'ien¹ Kung¹
Hakka
- Pha̍k-fa-sṳ: Hàng-thiên-kiûng
Southern Min
- Tâi-lô: Hîng-thian-kiong

General information
- Location: B1F 316 Songjiang Rd; Zhongshan District, Taipei; Taiwan
- Coordinates: 25.0597°N 121.5332°E
- System: Taipei metro station
- Lines: Zhonghe–Xinlu line Minsheng–Xizhi line (planning)

Construction
- Structure type: Underground
- Cycle facilities: Access available

Other information
- Station code: , SB03
- Website: web.metro.taipei/e/stationdetail2010.asp?ID=O09-131

History
- Opened: 3 November 2010; 15 years ago

Passengers
- 2017: 19.061 million per year ▲1.61%
- Rank: (Ranked 28 of 119)

Services
Preceding station	Taipei Metro	Following station
Songjiang Nanjing towards Nanshijiao	Zhonghe–Xinlu line	Zhongshan Elementary School towards Huilong or Luzhou
Shuanglian towards Dadaocheng	Minsheng–Xizhi line	NTPU Taipei Campus towards Xizhi
Location

Xingtian Temple (Chinese: 行天宮; pinyin: Xíngtiān Gōng) is a metro station in Taipei, Taiwan, served by the Taipei Metro, on the Zhonghe–Xinlu line. The station opened on 3 November 2010. It is named after the Xingtian Temple, but other places nearby, such as the Xingtian Temple Market and Songjiang Market are also notable. The station will be a planned transfer for the Minsheng–Xizhi line.

== Station overview ==
This three-level, underground station has an island platform and has four exits. It is located beneath the intersection of Minsheng East Rd. and Jinzhou Street, and opened on 3 November 2010 with the opening of the Luzhou Branch Line and the Taipei City section of the Xinzhuang Line. The station serves over 15,000 passengers per day and is the busiest station on the Xinzhuang Line.

=== Construction ===
Excavation depth for this station is around 25 meters. It is 157 meters in length and 25 meters wide. It has four entrances, one accessibility elevator, and two vent shafts. Three of the entrances are integrated with joint development buildings, while the other is connected with an existing sidewalk. Following Dapinglin, Xingtian Temple is only the second station to have three joint development sites. The station is equipped with platform screen doors.

== Station layout ==
Street level	Entrance/exit	Entrance/exit
B1	Concourse	Lobby, information desk, ticket machines, one-way faregates
B1	Concourse	Restrooms (inside fare zone, outside fare zone near Exit 1)
B3	Platform 1	← Zhonghe–Xinlu line toward Luzhou / Huilong (O10 Zhongshan Elementary School)
B3	Island platform, doors will open on the left
B3	Platform 2	→ Zhonghe–Xinlu line toward Nanshijiao (O08 Songjiang Nanjing) →

=== Exits ===
The station has four exits.

== Around the station ==
- Xingtian Temple
- Broadcasting Corporation of China Songjiang Building
- Zhongshan District Administrative Center
- Songjiang Market
- The Inn of the Sixth Happiness (between this station and Songjiang Nanjing Station)
- Taipei Municipal Datong High School
- Central News Agency
- Evergreen Marine Corporation Building
- Evergreen Chinese Medicine Clinic

=== Public art ===
Taking into account the nearby Xingtian Temple, the station has the "Eight Generals" (八家將; bajiajiang) masks and tiles as public art displays. Due to the anticipated passenger traffic through the station, the art displays were constructed out of ceramics for easier maintenance and protection from accidents.
