= Daqiaotou metro station =

Metro station in Taipei, Taiwan

Daqiaotou 大橋頭
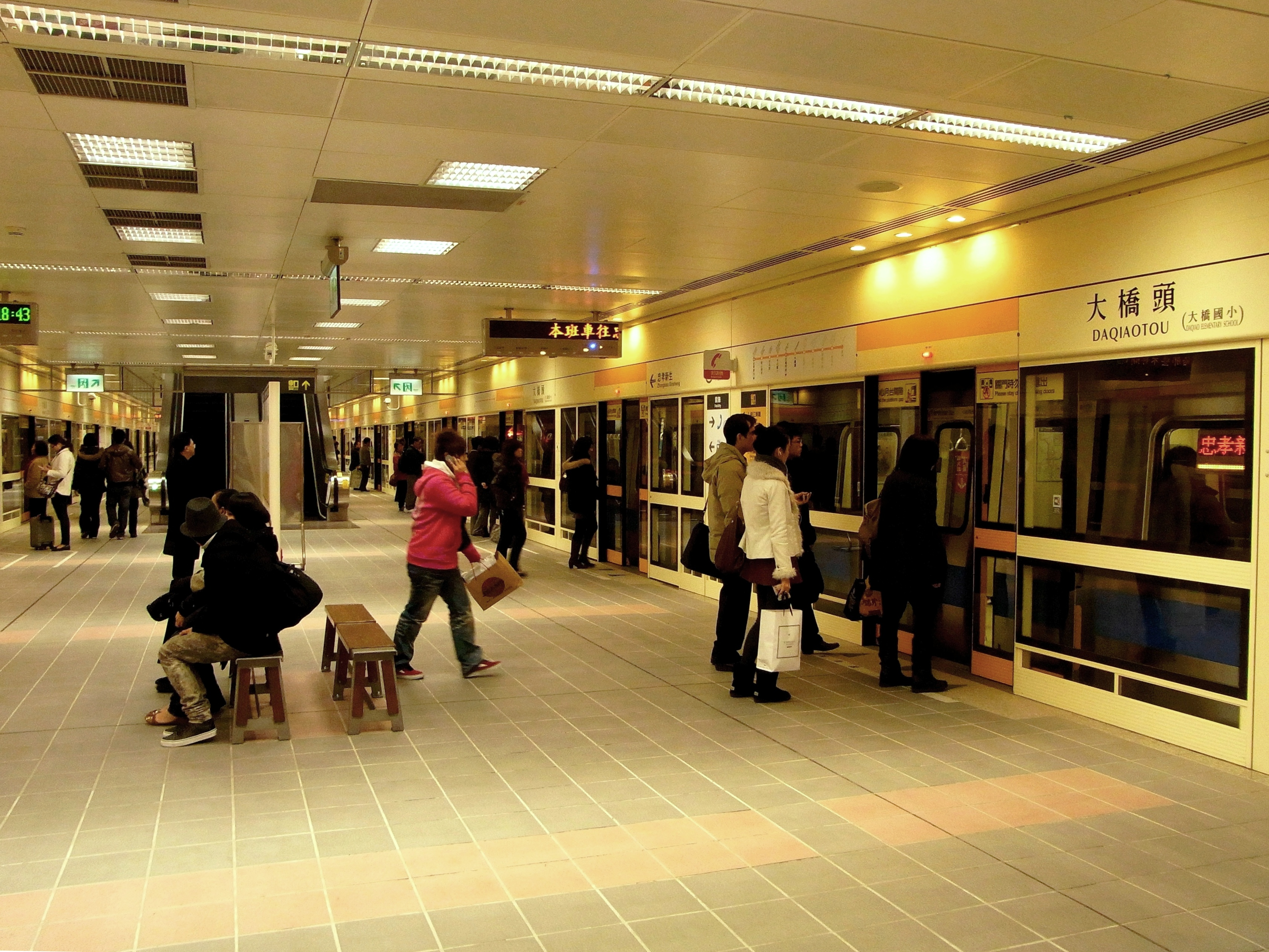
- Daqiaotou station platform 2

Chinese name
- Traditional Chinese: 大橋頭
- Simplified Chinese: 大桥头
- Literal meaning: Big bridge head
Transcriptions
Standard Mandarin
- Hanyu Pinyin: Dàqiáotóu
- Bopomofo: ㄉㄚˋ ㄑㄧㄠˊ ㄊㄡˊ
- Wade–Giles: Ta^{4}-ch'iao^{2}-t'ou^{2}
Hakka
- Pha̍k-fa-sṳ: Thai-khièu-thèu
Southern Min
- Hokkien POJ: Toā-kiô-thâu
- Tâi-lô: Tuā-kiô-thâu

General information
- Other names: Daqiao Elementary School; 大橋國小
- Location: B1, No. 223, Minquan W. Rd. Datong, Taipei; Taiwan
- Coordinates: 25.063277°N 121.512984°E
- Operator: Taipei Rapid Transit System
- Line: Zhonghe–Xinlu line
- Connections: Bus stop

Construction
- Structure type: Underground

Other information
- Station code: O12

History
- Opened: 3 November 2010; 15 years ago

Passengers
- 27,470 daily (December 2024)
- Rank: 60 out of 109

Services
Preceding station	Taipei Metro	Following station
Minquan West Road towards Nanshijiao	Zhonghe–Xinlu line	Taipei Bridge towards Huilong
Minquan West Road towards Nanshijiao	Zhonghe–Xinlu line	Sanchong Elementary School towards Luzhou
Location

The Taipei Metro Daqiaotou station (Chinese: 大橋頭站; Pe̍h-ōe-jī: Toā-kiô-thâu Chām) is a station on the Zhonghe–Xinlu line located in Datong District, Taipei, Taiwan. It is the last station before the Luzhou Line diverges from the Xinzhuang Line. It is a planned terminus for the Shezi Light Rail Line.

== Station overview ==
This four-level, underground station has an island platform. It is located beneath the intersection of Minquan West Rd., Chongqing South Rd., and the south side of Daqiao Elementary School Stadium. It opened for service on 3 November 2010 with the opening of the Luzhou Branch Line and the Taipei City section of the Xinzhuang Line.

=== History ===
Originally, plans for the Xinzhuang Line did not include a station in the Daqiaotou (大橋頭) area. However, as part of the city government's urban renewal policy, the area around the station was zoned for redevelopment and revitalization. Thus, in October 2007, it was announced that a new station would be added - Daqiao Elementary School Station. Shortly before the opening of the line, the station name was changed to Daqiaotou station to reflect the station's historical significance.

=== Design ===
The station has a light roof, glass curtain walls, and an arc ceiling. Interior station design is themed "Tales of an Important Bridge" (referring to Taipei Bridge) and features the Tamsui River, Dihua Street marketplace, and historic Daqiao Elementary School.

=== Construction ===
Excavation depth for this station is 32 meters deep. It is 158 meters in length and 19.85 meters wide. It has three entrances, one accessibility elevator, and two vent shafts. The entrances connect with existing pedestrian underpasses and two joint development buildings.

During construction, an 85-year-old red arched gate was temporarily removed. A swimming pool and students' play facilities were also demolished for station construction. The historic gate has since been moved back to its original position, and new swimming and play facilities have been constructed.

== Station layout ==
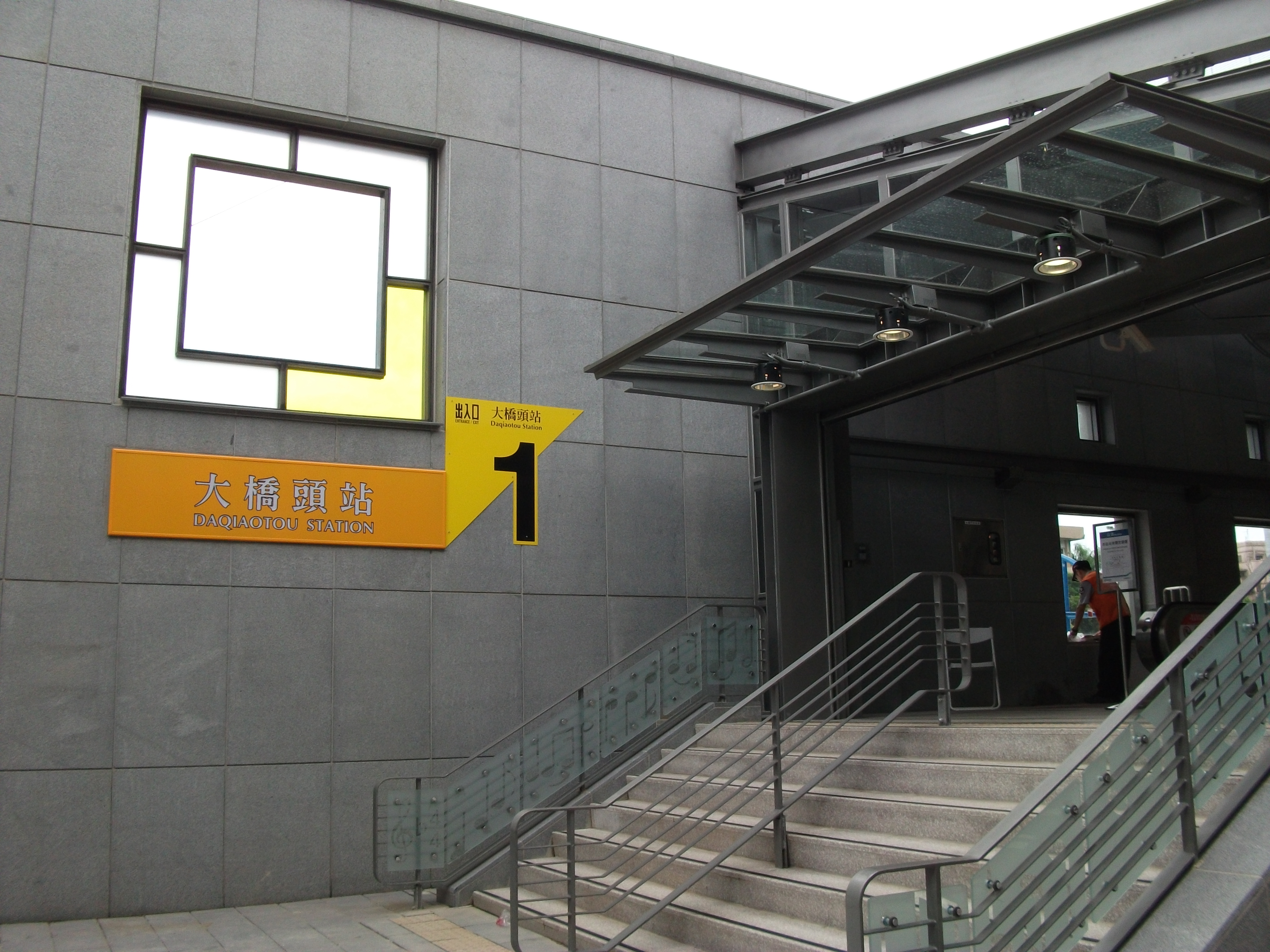
Daqiaotou station entrance 1

Street level	Entrance/exit	Entrance/exit
B2	Concourse	Lobby, information desk, automatic ticket dispensing machines, one-way faregates
B2	Concourse	Restrooms (inside fare zone, outside fare zone near exit 1)
B4	Platform 1	← Zhonghe–Xinlu line toward Luzhou (O50 Sanchong Elementary School) ← Zhonghe–Xinlu line toward Huilong (O13 Taipei Bridge)
B4	Island platform, doors will open on the left
B4	Platform 2	→ Zhonghe–Xinlu line toward Nanshijiao (O11 Minquan West Road) →

=== Exits ===
- Exit 1: Minquan W. Rd., Lane 225
- Exit 2: Northwest side of the intersection of Minquan W. Rd. and Chongqing N. Rd.
- Exit 3: Chongqing N. Rd. Sec. 3, beside the Daqiao Elementary School

== Around the station ==
- Ama Museum
- Taiwan New Cultural Movement Memorial Hall
- Daqiao Elementary School
- Minquan Junior High School
- Yongle Elementary School
- Taiping Elementary School
- Daojiang High School of Commerce
- Taipei Bridge
- Yansan Night Market
- Daqiao Police Station
- Daqiao Market
- Taipei Bridge Post Office
- CPC Corporation, Minquan West Rd. Gas Station
- Council of Indigenous Peoples
