= Dingxi metro station =

Metro station in New Taipei, Taiwan

Dingxi 頂溪
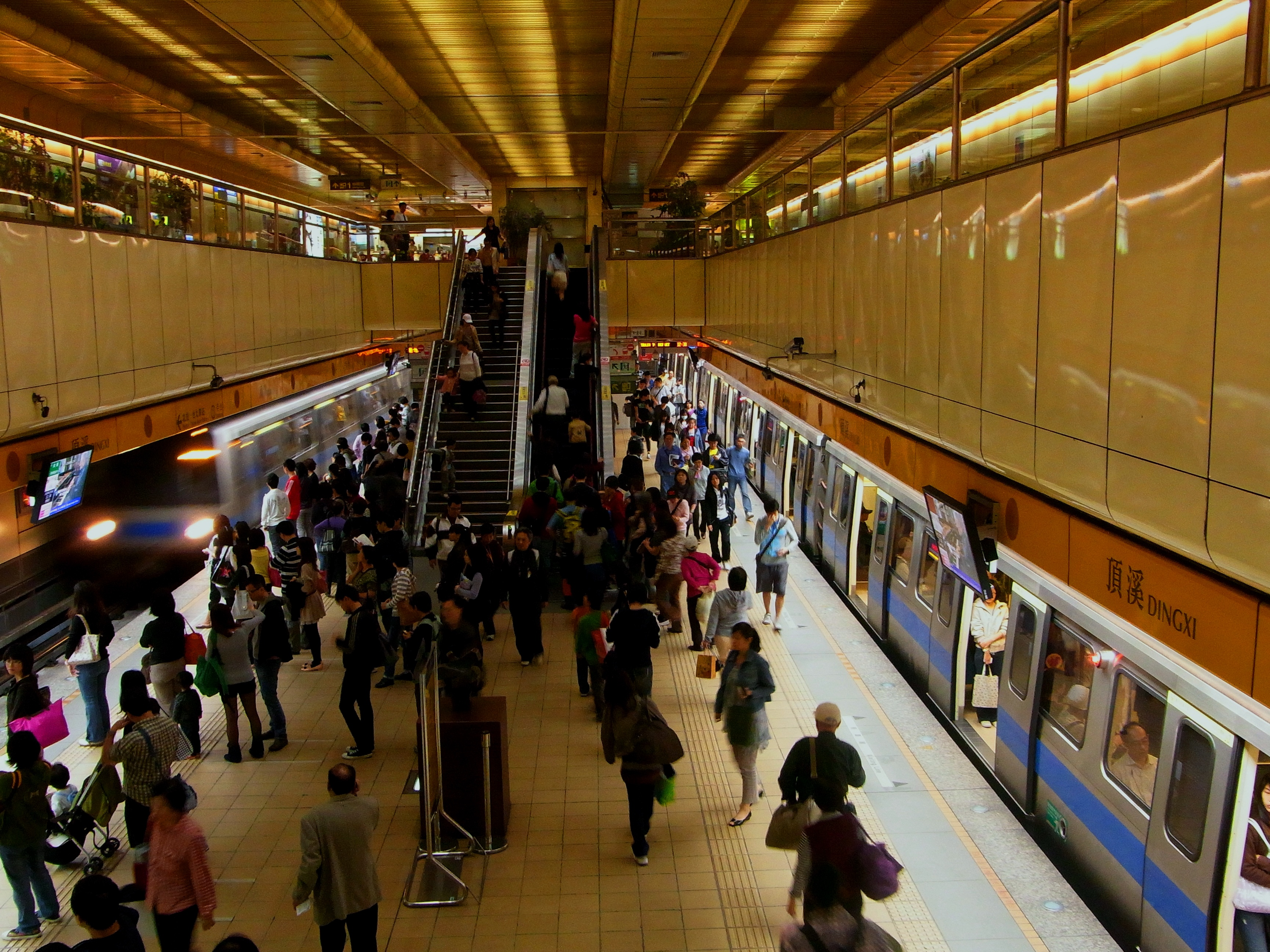
- Platform

Chinese name
- Traditional Chinese: 頂溪
- Simplified Chinese: 顶溪
Transcriptions
Standard Mandarin
- Hanyu Pinyin: Dǐngxī
- Bopomofo: ㄉㄧㄥˇㄒㄧ
- Wade–Giles: Ting³-hsi¹
Hakka
- Pha̍k-fa-sṳ: Táng-hâi
Southern Min
- Tâi-lô: Tíng-khe

General information
- Location: 168 Sec 2 Yonghe Rd; Yonghe, New Taipei; Taiwan
- Coordinates: 25.0135°N 121.5154°E
- System: Taipei metro station
- Line: Zhonghe–Xinlu line

Construction
- Structure type: Underground
- Cycle facilities: Access available

Other information
- Station code: O04
- Website: web.metro.taipei/e/stationdetail2010.asp?ID=O04-045

History
- Opened: 1998-12-24

Passengers
- 2017: 25.486 million per year ▲1.03%
- Rank: (Ranked 14 of 119)

Services
Preceding station	Taipei Metro	Following station
Yongan Market towards Nanshijiao	Zhonghe–Xinlu line	Guting towards Huilong or Luzhou
Location

Dingxi (Chinese: 頂溪, formerly transliterated as Tinghsi Station until 2003) is a metro station in New Taipei, Taiwan served by the Taipei Metro. It is a station on Zhonghe–Xinlu line.

== Station overview ==
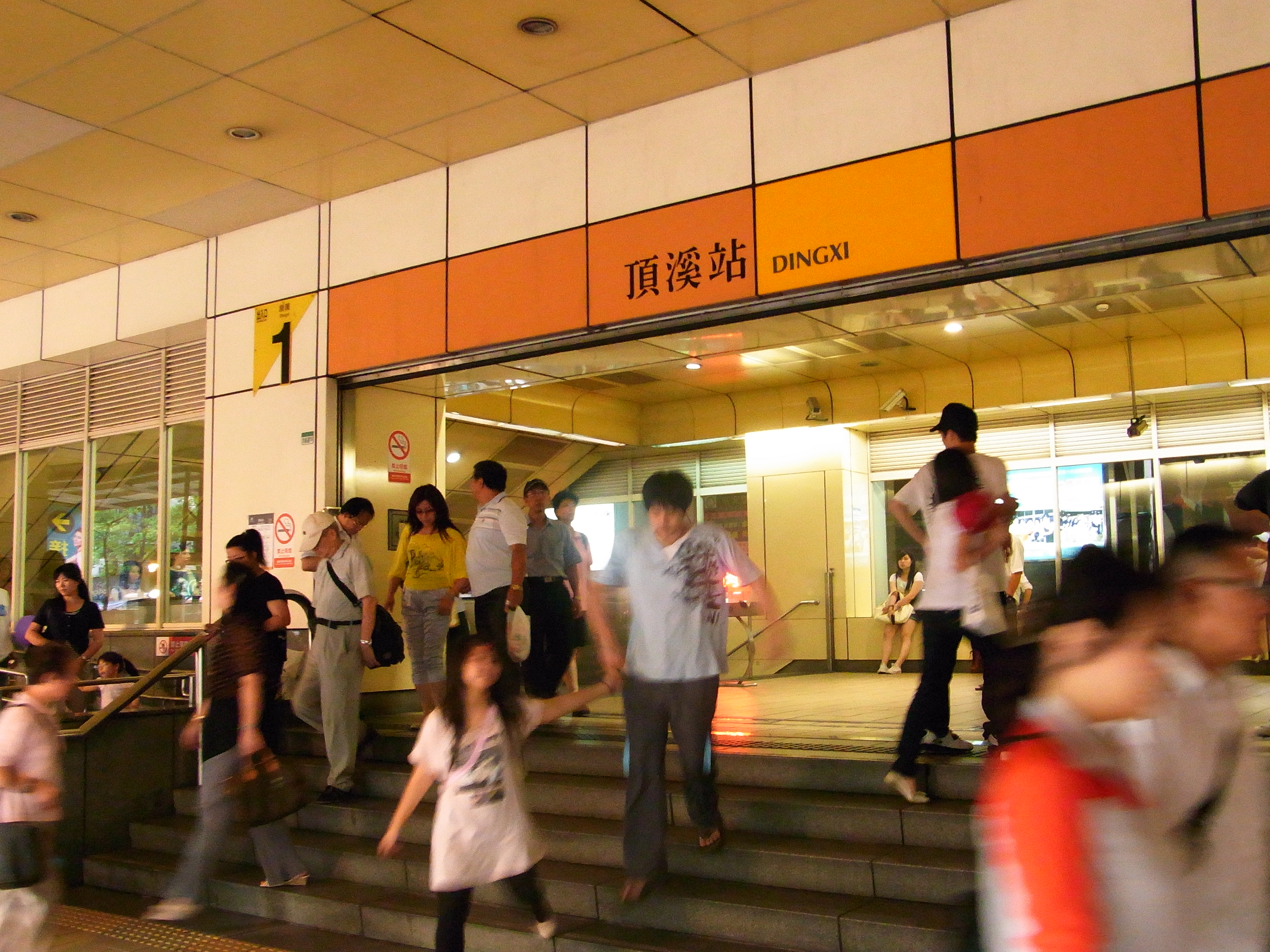
Dingxi station exit 1

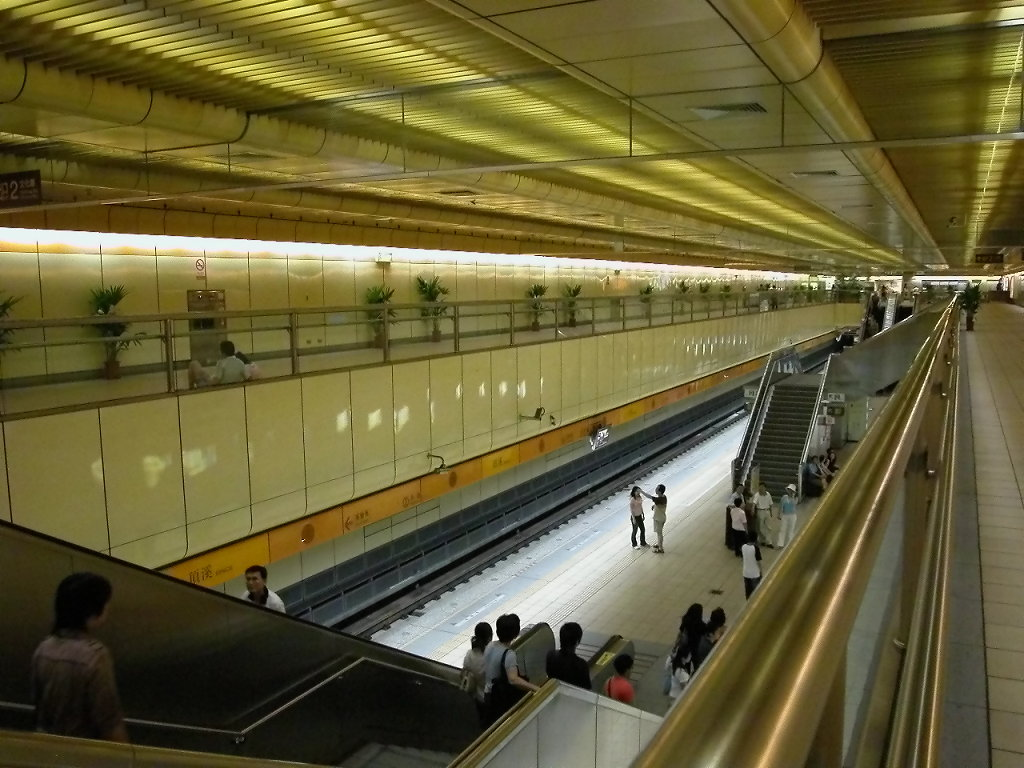
Dingxi station platform

This two-level, underground station has an island platform and two exits.

== History ==
The station got its current name on 27 February 2011. This was the result of a reorganization on 25 December 2010, when the territory was incorporated into New Taipei. Service began with the opening of the Zhonghe Line. Another accessibility elevator was opened at exit 1; it was completed after a year of construction.

== Station layout ==
Street level	Entrance/exit	Entrance/exit
B1	Concourse	Lobby, information counter, automatic ticket dispensing machines, one-way faregates
B1	Concourse	Restrooms (south side outside fare zone, near exit 1), Dingxi Shops
B2	Platform 1	← Zhonghe–Xinlu line toward Luzhou / Huilong (O05 Guting)
B2	Island platform, doors open on the left
B2	Platform 2	Zhonghe–Xinlu line toward Nanshijiao (O03 Yongan Market) →

=== Exits ===
- Exit 1: Yonghe Rd. Sec. 2 and Zhongxing St.
- Exit 2: Yonghe Rd. Sec. 2 and Wenhua Rd.

== Around the station ==
- Lehua Night Market
- Green River Park
- Yonghe Emerald Riverside Park
- Yonghe Bike Rental
