= Sanchong Elementary School metro station =

Metro station in New Taipei, Taiwan

Sanchong Elementary School 三重國小
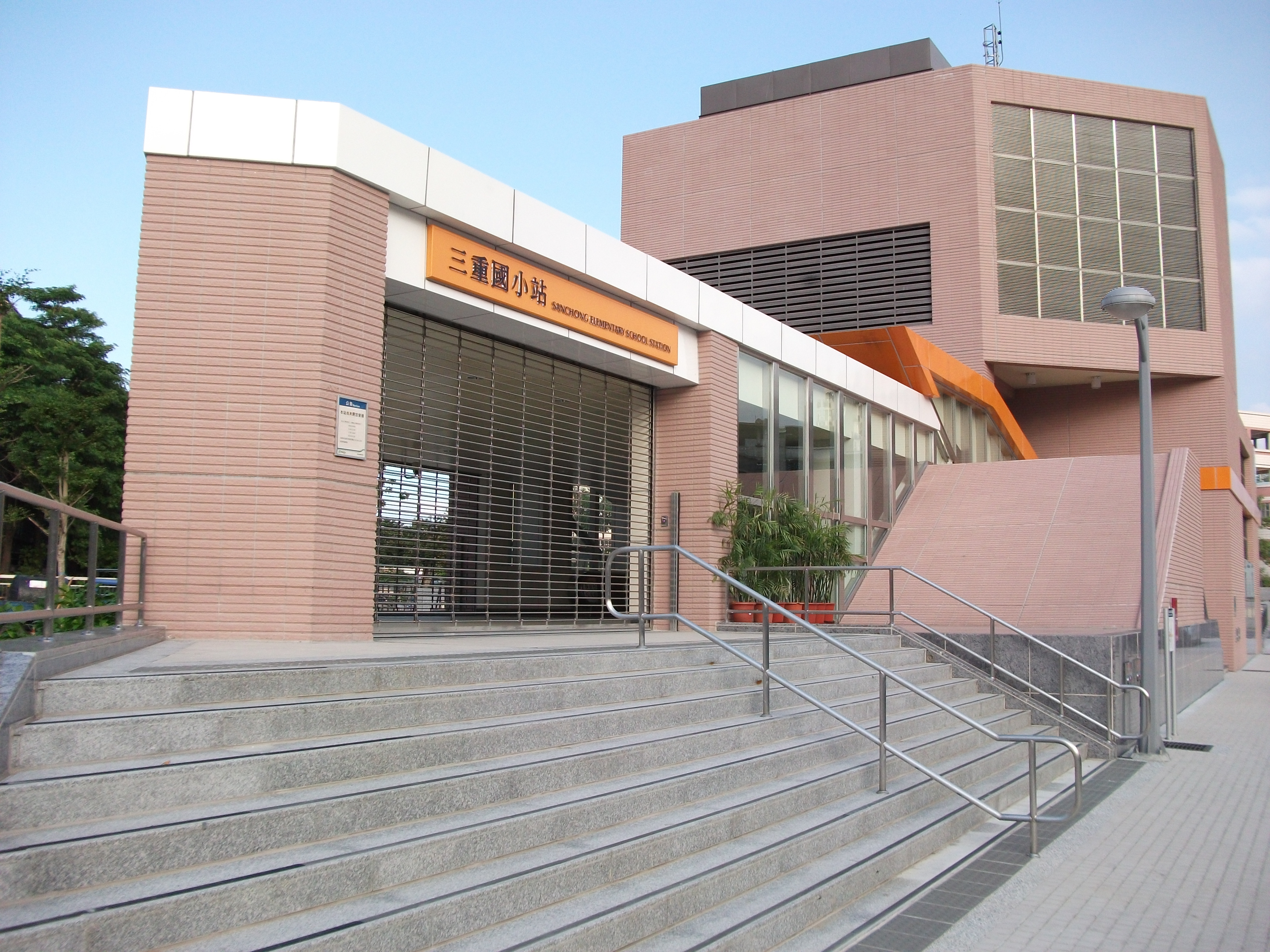
- Sanchong Elementary School station entrance

Chinese name
- Traditional Chinese: 三重國小
- Simplified Chinese: 三重国小
Transcriptions
Standard Mandarin
- Hanyu Pinyin: Sānchóng Guóxiǎo
- Bopomofo: ㄙㄢ ㄔㄨㄥˊ ㄍㄨㄛˊㄒㄧㄠˇ
Hakka
- Pha̍k-fa-sṳ: Sâm-chhùng Koet-séu
Southern Min
- Tâi-lô: Sam-tîong Kok-siò

General information
- Location: B1, No. 5, Sec. 3, Sanhe Rd. Sanchong, New Taipei; Taiwan
- Coordinates: 25.070002°N 121.497384°E
- Operator: Taipei Metro
- Line: Zhonghe–Xinlu line
- Connections: Bus stop

Construction
- Structure type: Underground

Other information
- Station code: O50

History
- Opened: 3 November 2010; 15 years ago

Passengers
- 24,606 daily (December 2024)
- Rank: 69 out of 109

Services
Preceding station	Taipei Metro	Following station
Daqiaotou towards Nanshijiao	Zhonghe–Xinlu line	Sanhe Junior High School towards Luzhou
Location

The Taipei Metro Sanchong Elementary School station is a station on the Zhonghe–Xinlu line located in Sanchong District, New Taipei, Taiwan. The station opened for service on 3 November 2010.

== Station overview ==
This two-level, underground station has an island platform. It is located beneath the intersection of Sanhe Rd., Sec. 3 and Renai Rd., Anle St., and Anxing St. It was opened for service on 3 November 2010 when the Luzhou Line opened.

=== Construction ===
Excavation depth for this station is 20.8 meters (68 ft). It is 153.4 meters (503 ft) in length and 18–49 meters (59–161 ft)wide. It has one entrance, one emergency exit, one accessibility elevator, and two vent shafts.

=== Station design ===
The theme for the station is "Wings Over a Garden", as part of a common theme of egrets for the Luzhou Line.

== Station layout ==
Street level	Entrance/exit	Entrance/exit
B1	Concourse	Lobby, information desk, automatic ticket dispensing machines, one-way faregates
B1	Concourse	Restrooms (outside fare zone)
B2	Platform 1	← Zhonghe–Xinlu line toward Luzhou (O51 Sanhe Junior High School)
B2	Island platform, doors will open on the left
B2	Platform 2	→ Zhonghe–Xinlu line toward Nanshijiao (O12 Daqiaotou) →

=== Exits ===
- Single Exit: Intersection of Sanhe Rd. Sec. 3 and Renai St.

== Around the station ==
- Sanchong Elementary School
- Sanhe Night Market
- Jieshou Plaza
- Haude Police Station (between this station and Sanhe Junior High School station)
- Guangrong Junior High School
- Guangrong Elementary School
- National Highway No. 1
