= Sanhe Junior High School metro station =

Metro station in New Taipei, Taiwan

Sanhe Junior High School 三和國中
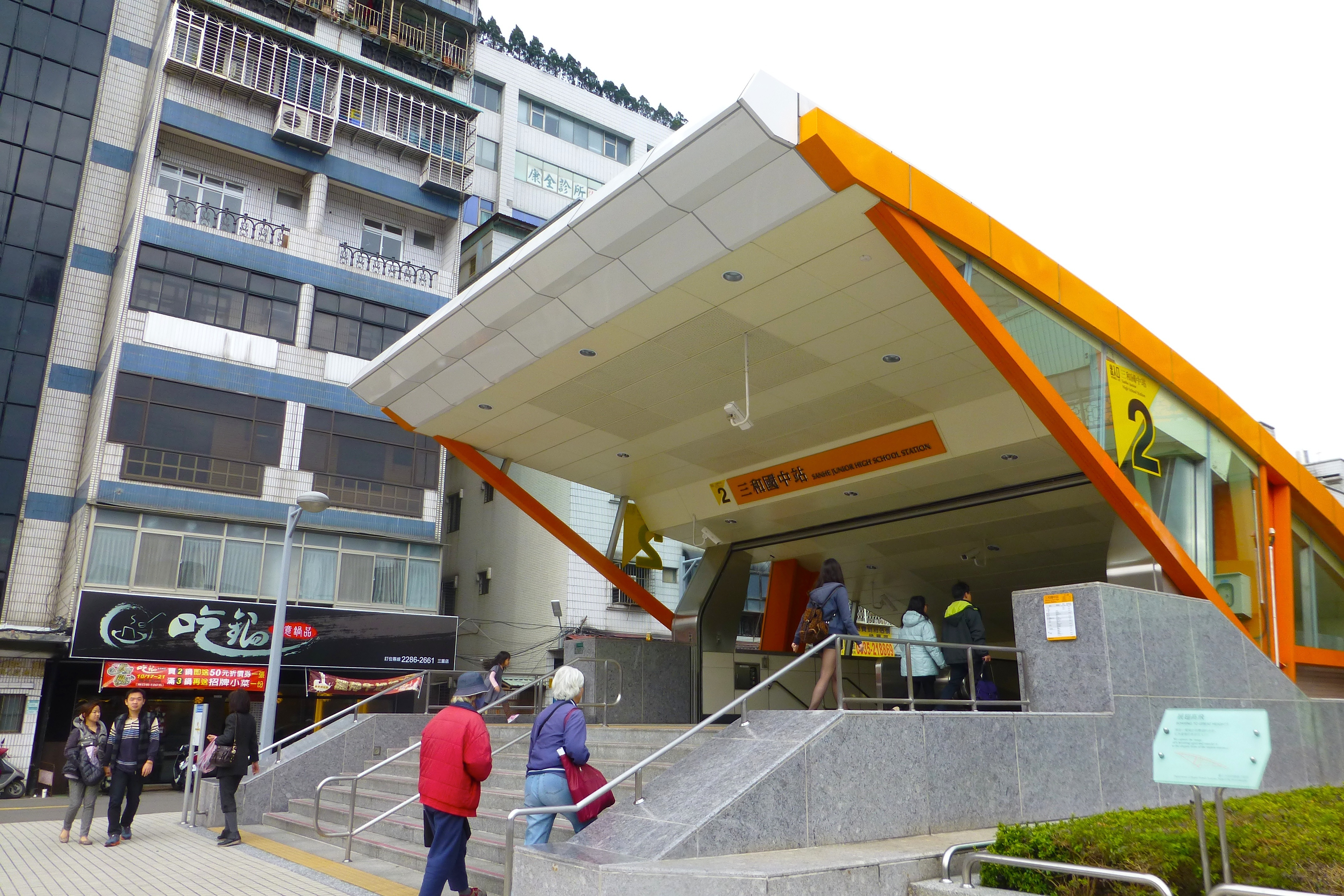
- Sanhe Junior High School station, exit 2

Chinese name
- Traditional Chinese: 三和國中
- Simplified Chinese: 三和国中
Transcriptions
Standard Mandarin
- Hanyu Pinyin: Sānhé Guózhōng
- Bopomofo: 厶ㄢ ㄏㄜˊ ㄍㄨㄛˊ ㄓㄨㄥ
Hakka
- Pha̍k-fa-sṳ: Sâm-fò Koet-chûng
Southern Min
- Tâi-lô: Sam-hô Kok-tiong

General information
- Location: B1, No. 107, Sec. 4, Sanhe Rd. Sanchong, New Taipei; Taiwan
- Coordinates: 25.076557°N 121.486827°E
- Operator: Taipei Metro
- Line: Zhonghe–Xinlu line
- Connections: Bus stop

Construction
- Structure type: Underground

Other information
- Station code: O51

History
- Opened: 3 November 2010; 15 years ago

Passengers
- 25,950 daily (December 2024)
- Rank: 70 out of 109

Services
Preceding station	Taipei Metro	Following station
Sanchong Elementary School towards Nanshijiao	Zhonghe–Xinlu line	St Ignatius High School towards Luzhou
Location

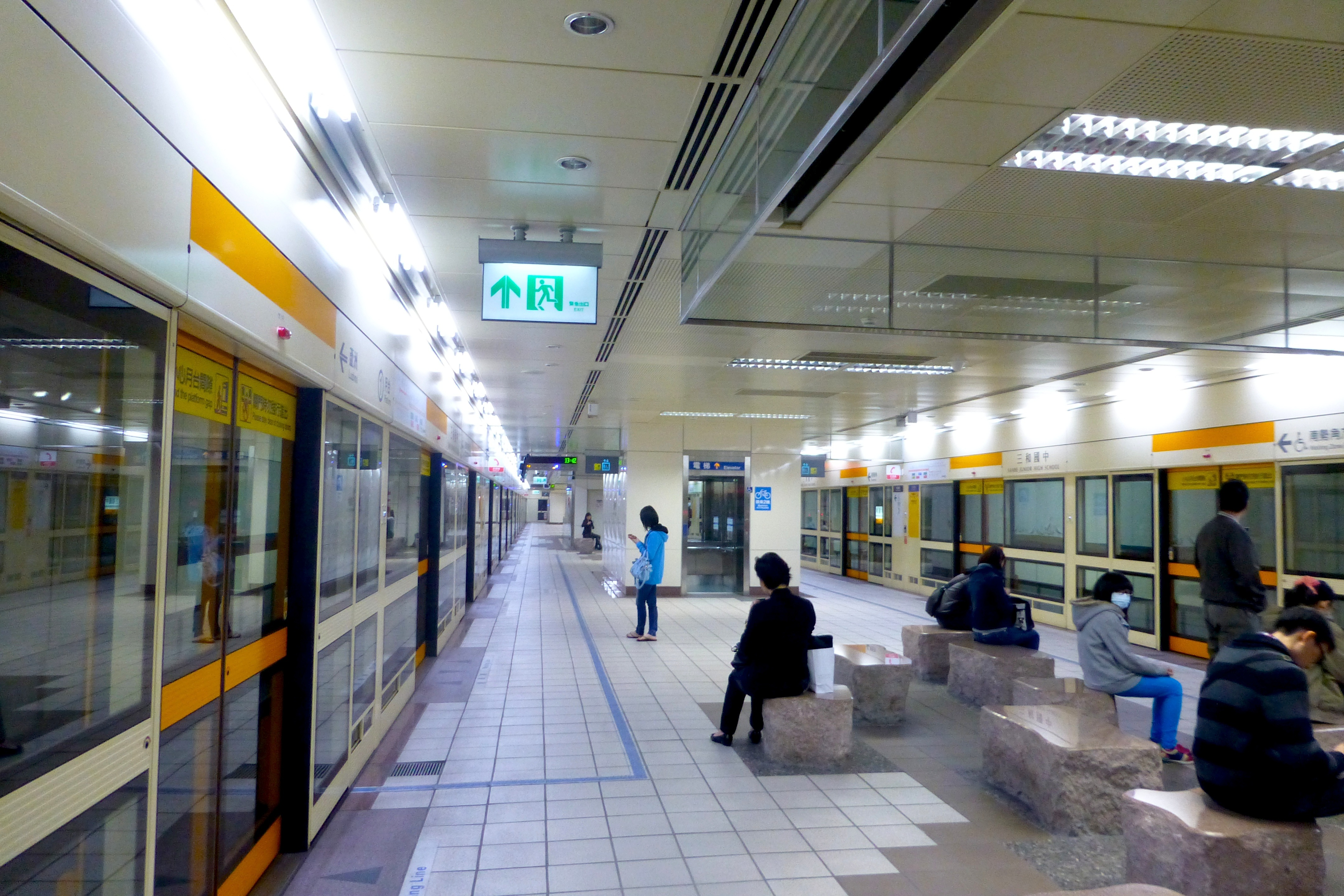
Station platform

The Taipei Metro Sanhe Junior High School station is a station on the Zhonghe–Xinlu line located in Sanchong District, New Taipei, Taiwan. It opened for service on 3 November 2010.

== Station overview ==
This two-level, underground station has an island platform and is located at the intersection of Sanhe Rd., Sec. 4 and Ziqiang Rd. The station opened for service in November 2010 with the opening of the Luzhou Branch Line.

=== Construction ===
Excavation depth for this station is 18.5 meters. It is 213.7 meters in length and 18.5 meters wide. It has two entrances, one emergency exit, one accessibility elevator, and two vent shafts.

=== Station design ===
The theme for the station is "Standing on One Leg on a Sandbank", as part of a common theme of egrets for the Luzhou Line.

== Station layout ==
Street level	Entrance/exit	Entrance/exit
B1	Concourse	Lobby, information desk, automatic ticket dispensing machines, one-way faregates
B1	Concourse	Restrooms (inside fare zone, outside fare zone near exit 2)
B2	Platform 1	← Zhonghe–Xinlu line toward Luzhou (O52 St Ignatius High School)
B2	Island platform, doors will open on the left
B2	Platform 2	→ Zhonghe–Xinlu line toward Nanshijiao (O50 Sanchong Elementary School) →

=== Exits ===
- Exit 1: Sanhe Junior High School
- Exit 2: Sanhe Rd. Sec. 4

== Around the station ==
- Sanhe Junior High School - exit 2
- Haude Police Station (between this station and Sanchong Elementary School station)
- Ger Jyh Senior High School
