= St. Ignatius Plaza =

Shopping mall in Luzhou, New Taipei, Taiwan

- 徐匯廣場

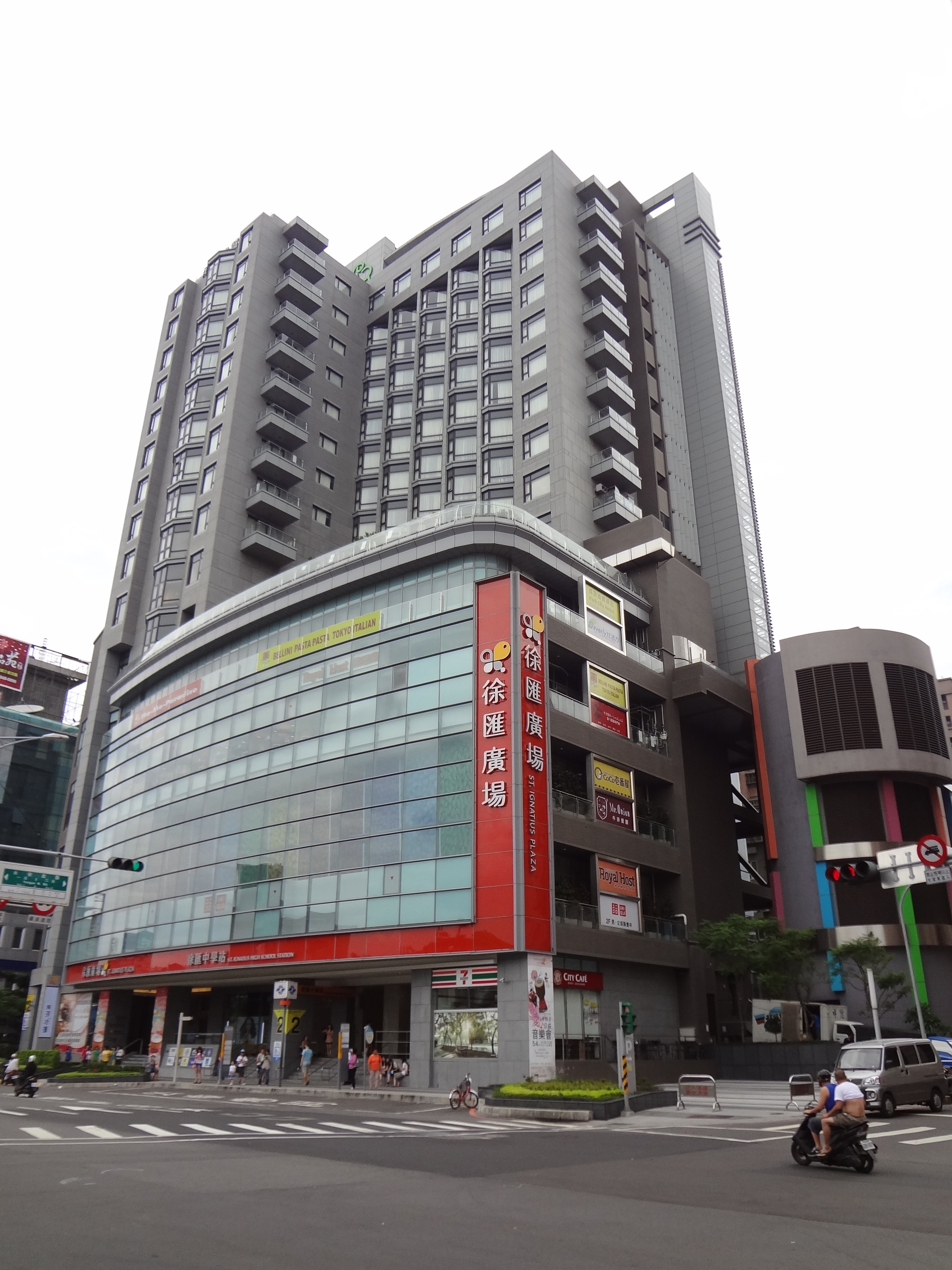
- Location: No. 8, Zhongshan 1st Road, Luzhou District, New Taipei, Taiwan
- Coordinates: 25.081621906381333°N 121.4799055441894°E
- Opened: March 2, 2012
- Owner: Free-Life Development Corporation
- Floor area: 110,000 m^{2} (1,200,000 sq ft)
- Floors: 15 floors above ground 6 floors below ground
- Parking: 1274
- Public transit: St Ignatius High School metro station
- Website: http://www.iplaza.com.tw/

St. Ignatius Plaza (Chinese: 徐匯廣場; pinyin: Xú Hùi guǎngchǎng) is a shopping center in Luzhou District, New Taipei, Taiwan, that opened on March 2, 2012. It is the first and largest shopping mall in the district. The total floor area is about 110,000 m^{2} (1,200,000 sq ft), ranging from level five above ground to level B2 (the third to the sixth underground floors are parking lots). The main core stores of the mall include UNIQLO, Muji and various themed restaurants. There is a MRT connection channel on level B2 connecting to St Ignatius High School metro station.

== Floor Guide ==
Levels 6–15	Themed stores
Levels 4 & 5	Food court and restaurants
Level 3	Women's fashion, Muji
Level 2	Leisure and sports
Level 1	Lifestyle
B1	Lohasism
B2	Food court

== Gallery ==
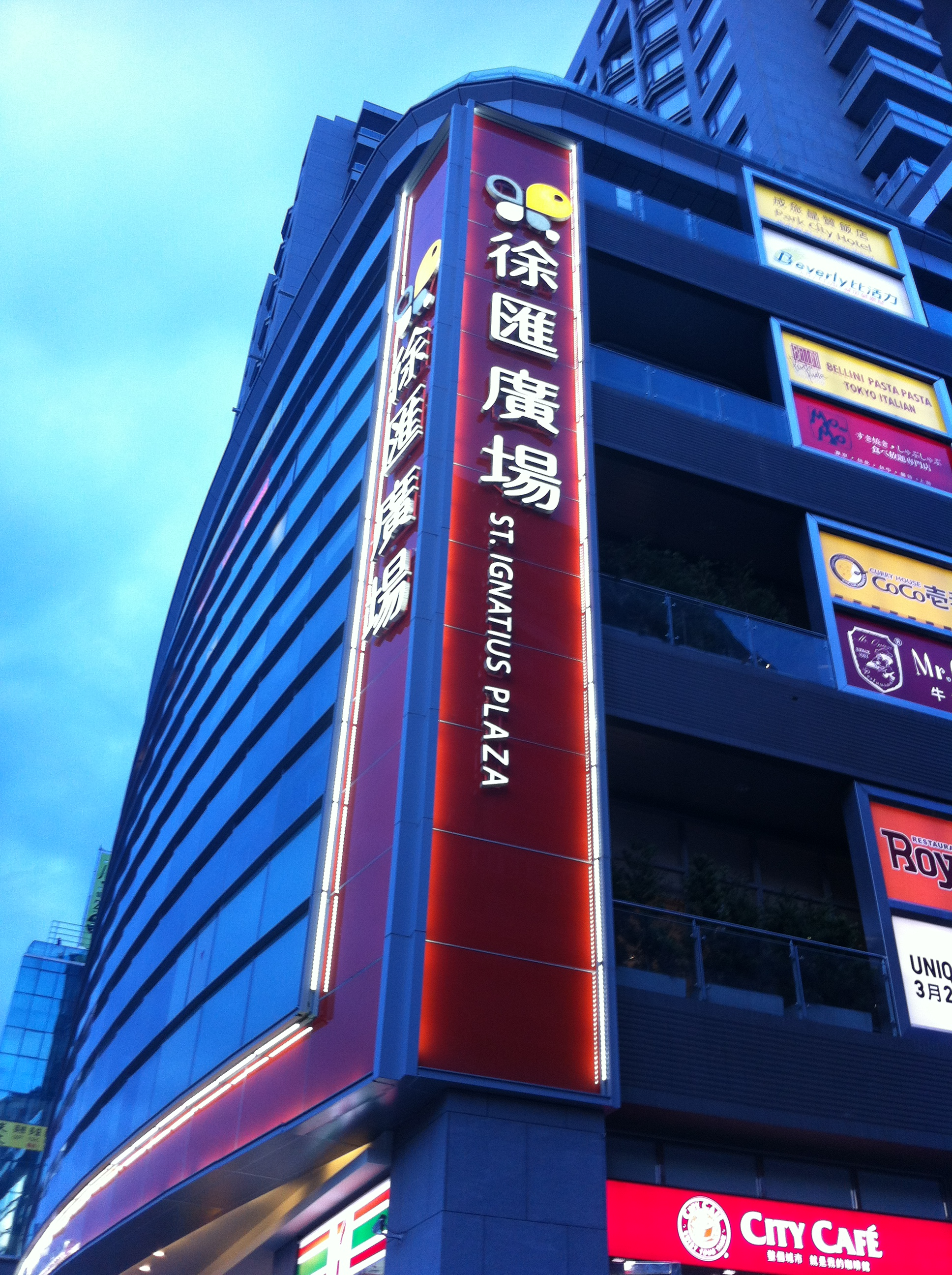
At night

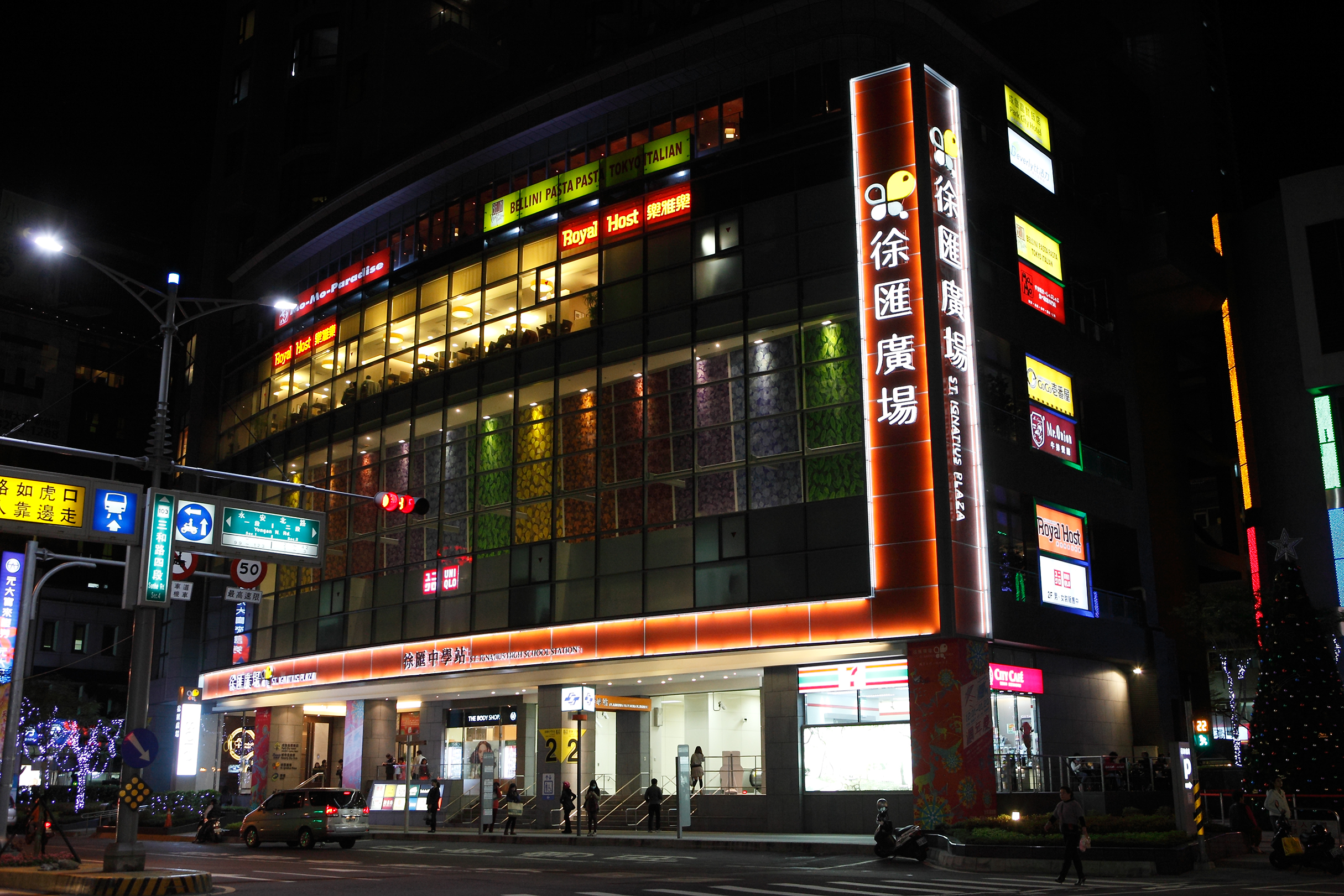
Exterior

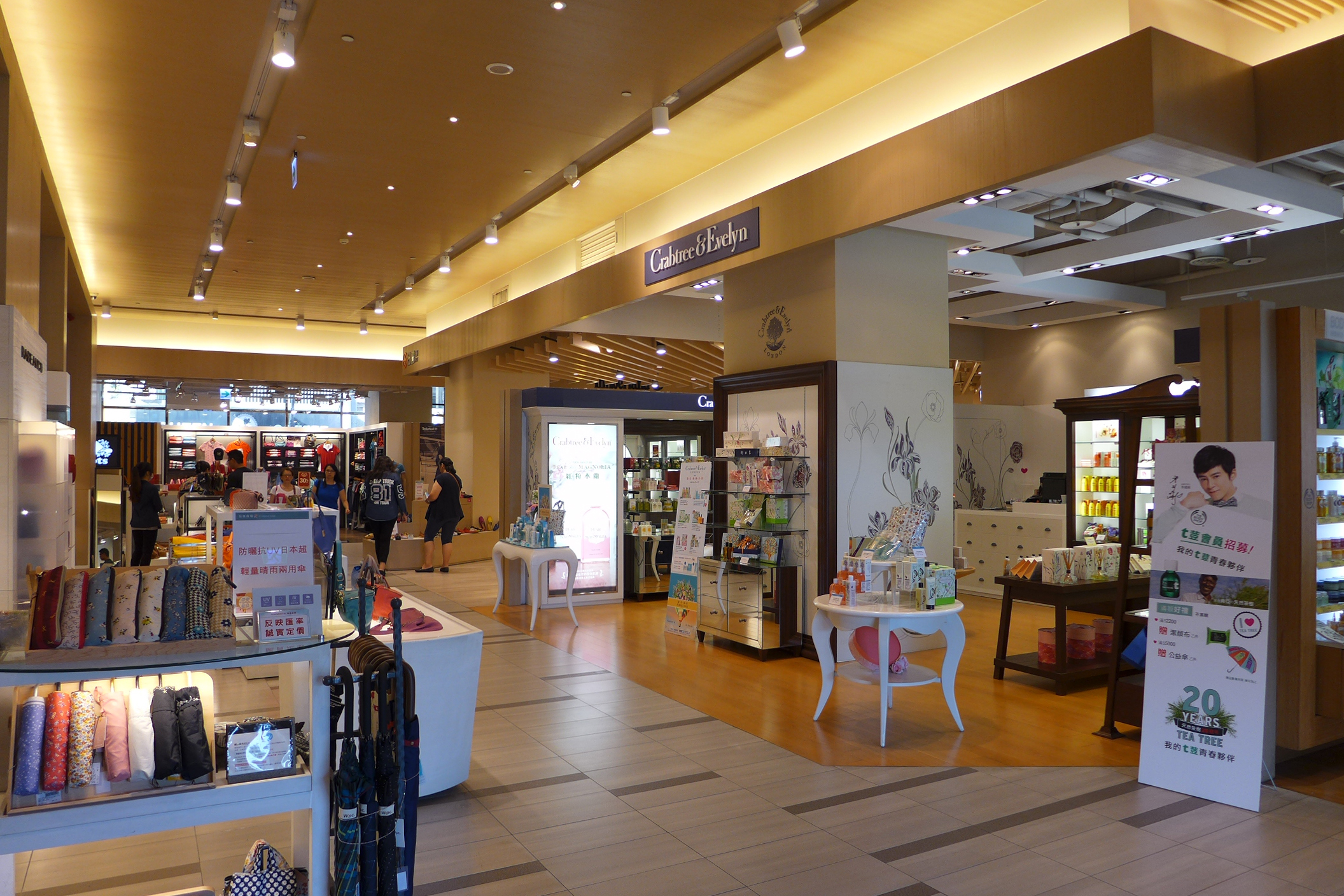
Level 1

== See also ==
- List of tourist attractions in Taiwan
