= Sanmin Senior High School metro station =

Metro station in New Taipei, Taiwan

Sanmin Senior High School 三民高中
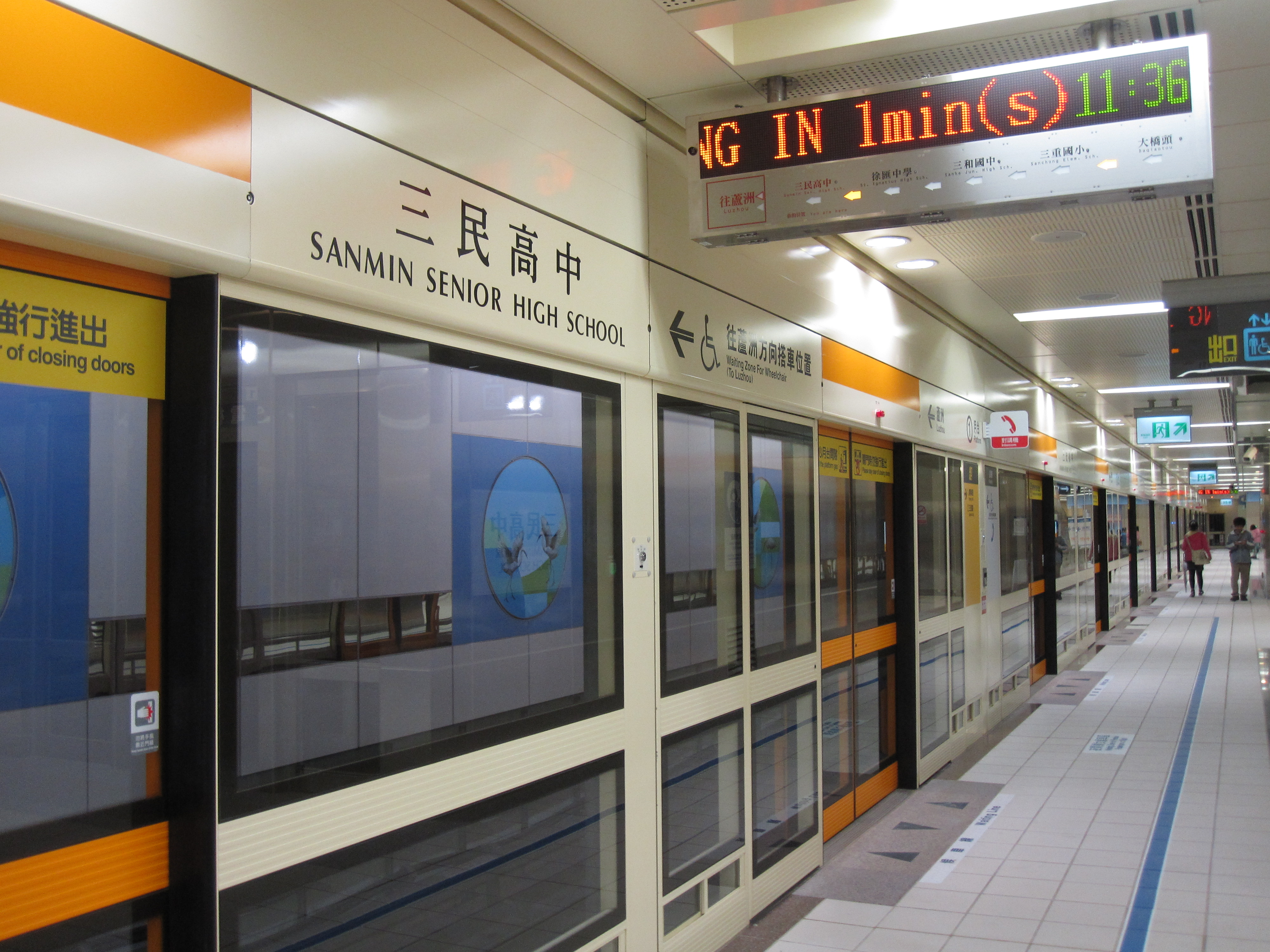
- Sanmin Senior High School station platform 1

Chinese name
- Chinese: 三民高中
Transcriptions
Standard Mandarin
- Hanyu Pinyin: Sānmín Gāozhōng
- Bopomofo: ㄙㄢㄇㄧㄣˊ ㄍㄠ ㄓㄨㄥ
Hakka
- Pha̍k-fa-sṳ: Sâm-mìn Kô-chûng
Southern Min
- Tâi-lô: Sam-bîn Koo-tiong

General information
- Other names: National Open University; 空中大學
- Location: B1, No. 105, Sanmin Rd. Luzhou, New Taipei; Taiwan
- Coordinates: 25.085385°N 121.473427°E
- Operator: Taipei Metro
- Line: Zhonghe–Xinlu line
- Connections: Bus stop

Construction
- Structure type: Underground

Other information
- Station code: O53

History
- Opened: 3 November 2010; 15 years ago

Passengers
- 24,481 daily (December 2024)
- Rank: 62 out of 109

Services
Preceding station	Taipei Metro	Following station
St Ignatius High School towards Nanshijiao	Zhonghe–Xinlu line	Luzhou Terminus
Location

The Taipei Metro Sanmin Senior High School station is a station on the Zhonghe–Xinlu line located in Luzhou, New Taipei, Taiwan.

== Station overview ==
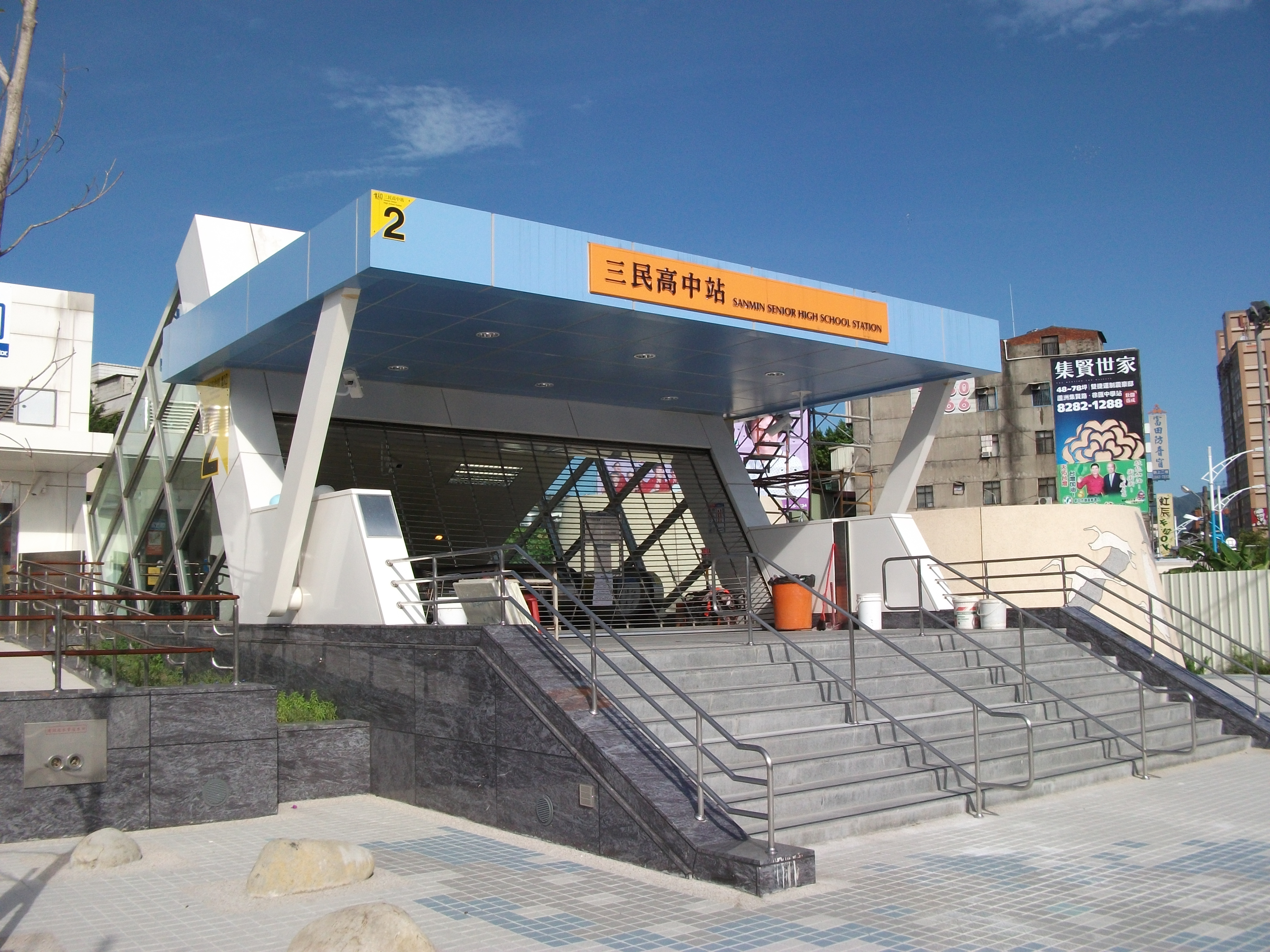
Sanmin Senior High School station entrance

This two-level, underground station is located at the intersection of Sanmin Rd. and Fuxing Rd. It opened on 3 November 2010, with the opening of the Luzhou Line.

The station served over 14,000 passengers per day within two weeks of opening, and has the second-highest daily ridership on the Luzhou Line by the end of November 2010 at 25,433 passengers per day (after Luzhou).

=== Construction ===
Excavation depth for the station is around 26 meters. The station is 193 meters in length and 22 meters in width with two entrances, an elevator for the disabled, and two vent shafts. Because of geological features of the area (sand deposits resulting in weak ground), reinforcing structures were enlarged for safety considerations.

=== Station design ===
The theme for the station is "At Home in the Water", as part of a common theme of egrets for the Luzhou Line. Vent shafts form images of nests and hills.

== Station layout ==
Street level	Entrance/exit	Entrance/exit
B4	Concourse	Lobby, information desk, automatic ticket dispensing machines, one-way faregates
B4	Concourse	Restrooms (inside fare zone, outside fare zone near exit 1)
B5	Platform 1	← Zhonghe–Xinlu line toward Luzhou (O54 terminus)
B5	Island platform, doors will open on the left
B5	Platform 2	→ Zhonghe–Xinlu line toward Nanshijiao (O52 St Ignatius High School) →

=== Exits ===
- Exit 1: Sanmin Rd.
- Exit 2: Fuxing Rd.

== Around the station ==
- Luzhou City Office
- Sanmin Senior High School
- Luzhou Elementary School
- Lujiang Elementary School
- National Open University
