= St Ignatius High School metro station =

Metro station in New Taipei, Taiwan

St. Ignatius High School / Y24 徐匯中學
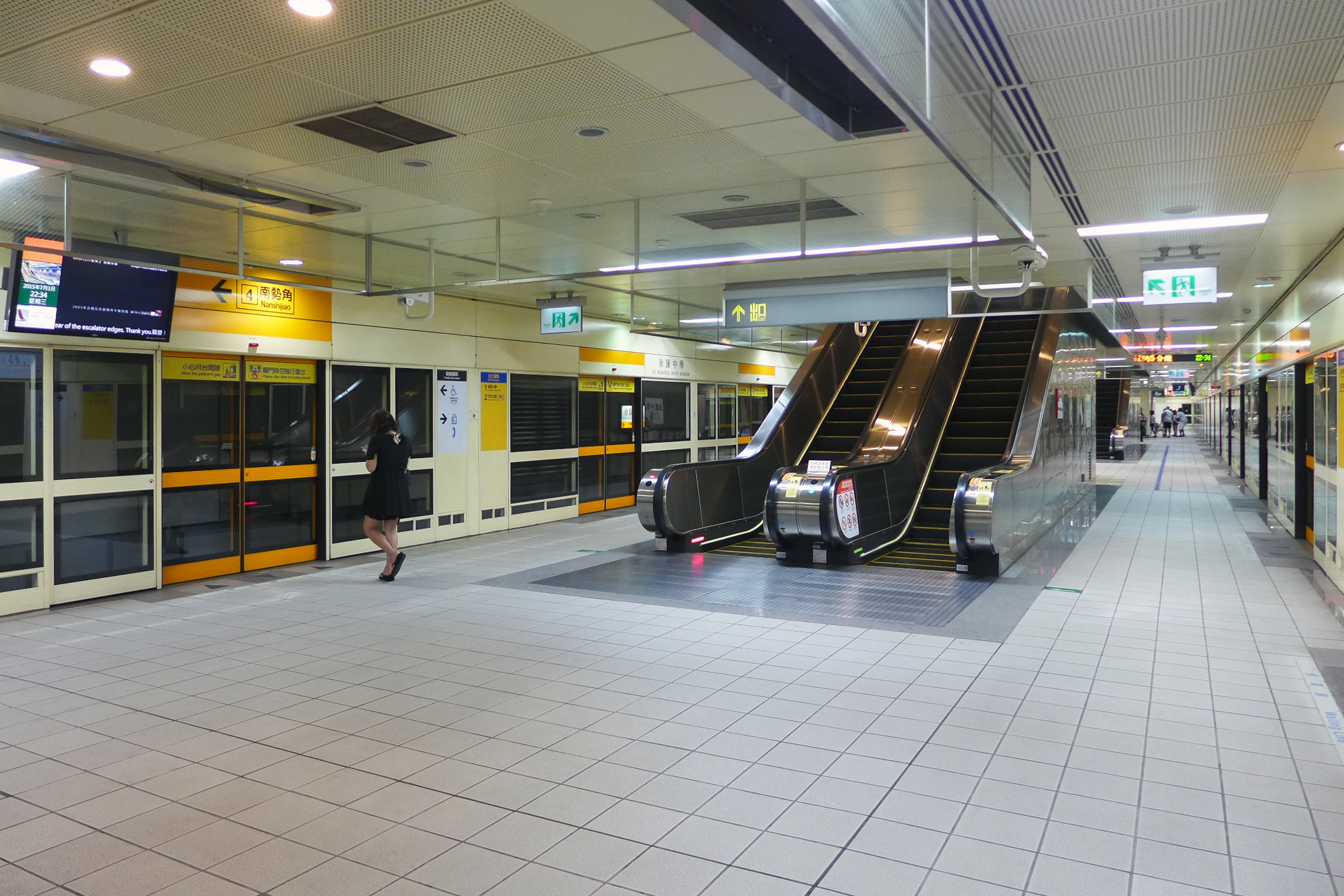
- St. Ignatius High School station platform 2

Chinese name
- Traditional Chinese: 徐匯中學
- Simplified Chinese: 徐汇中学
Transcriptions
Standard Mandarin
- Hanyu Pinyin: Xúhuì Zhōngxué
- Bopomofo: ㄒㄩˊ ㄏㄨㄟˋ ㄓㄨㄥ ㄒㄩㄝˊ
Hakka
- Pha̍k-fa-sṳ: Chhì-fi Chûng-ho̍k
Southern Min
- Tâi-lô: Tshî-hūi Tiong-hak

General information
- Location: B1, No. 3, Zhongshan 1st Rd. Luzhou, New Taipei; Taiwan
- Coordinates: 25.080463°N 121.4801°E
- Operator: Taipei Metro
- Lines: Zhonghe–Xinlu line (O52); Circular line (Y24)
- Connections: Bus stop

Construction
- Structure type: Underground

Other information
- Station code: / Y24

History
- Opened: 3 November 2010

Passengers
- 25,244 daily (December 2024)
- Rank: 63 out of 109

Services
Preceding station	Taipei Metro	Following station
Sanhe Junior High School towards Nanshijiao	Zhonghe–Xinlu line	Sanmin Senior High School towards Luzhou
Future services
Preceding station	New Taipei Metro	Following station
Zhonglu towards Taipei Zoo	Circular line after Phase 2	Fenziwei towards Jiannan Road
Location

The Taipei Metro St. Ignatius High School station is a station on the Zhonghe–Xinlu line located in Luzhou District, New Taipei, Taiwan. It opened on 3 November 2010. It will become a transfer station with the Circular line in 2031.

== Station overview ==
This three-level, underground station is located at the intersection of Jixian Rd. and Zhongxian 1st Rd. It opened on 3 November 2010 with the opening of the Luzhou Line.

=== Construction ===
Excavation depth for this station is around 32 meters. It is 151 meters in length and 23 meters wide. It has two entrances, one emergency exit, one accessibility elevator, and two vent shafts. Exit B is integrated with a joint development building.

For the Circular line station, the platform level has already been set aside (according to the current station layout).

=== Station design ===
The theme for the station is "Reeds Swaying in the Moonlight", as part of a common theme of egrets for the Luzhou Line.

== Station layout ==
Street level	Entrance/exit	Entrance/exit
B1	Concourse	Lobby, information desk, automatic ticket dispensing machines, one-way faregates
B1	Concourse	Restrooms (south side of station outside fare zone, near exit 1)
B4	Platform 1	← Zhonghe–Xinlu line toward Luzhou (O53 Sanmin Senior High School)
B4	Island platform, doors will open on the left
B4	Platform 2	→ Zhonghe–Xinlu line toward Nanshijiao (O51 Sanhe Junior High School) →

=== Exits ===
- Exit 1: St. Ignatius High School
- Exit 2: Yongan N. Rd., Sec. 2

== Around the station ==
- Luzhou Post Office
- St. Ignatius High School
- Yongfu Elementary School
- Nicaragua Park
- Bihua Cloth Street
