= National Open University =

University in Taiwan

Coordinates: 25.0882°N 121.4679°E

- 國立空中大學
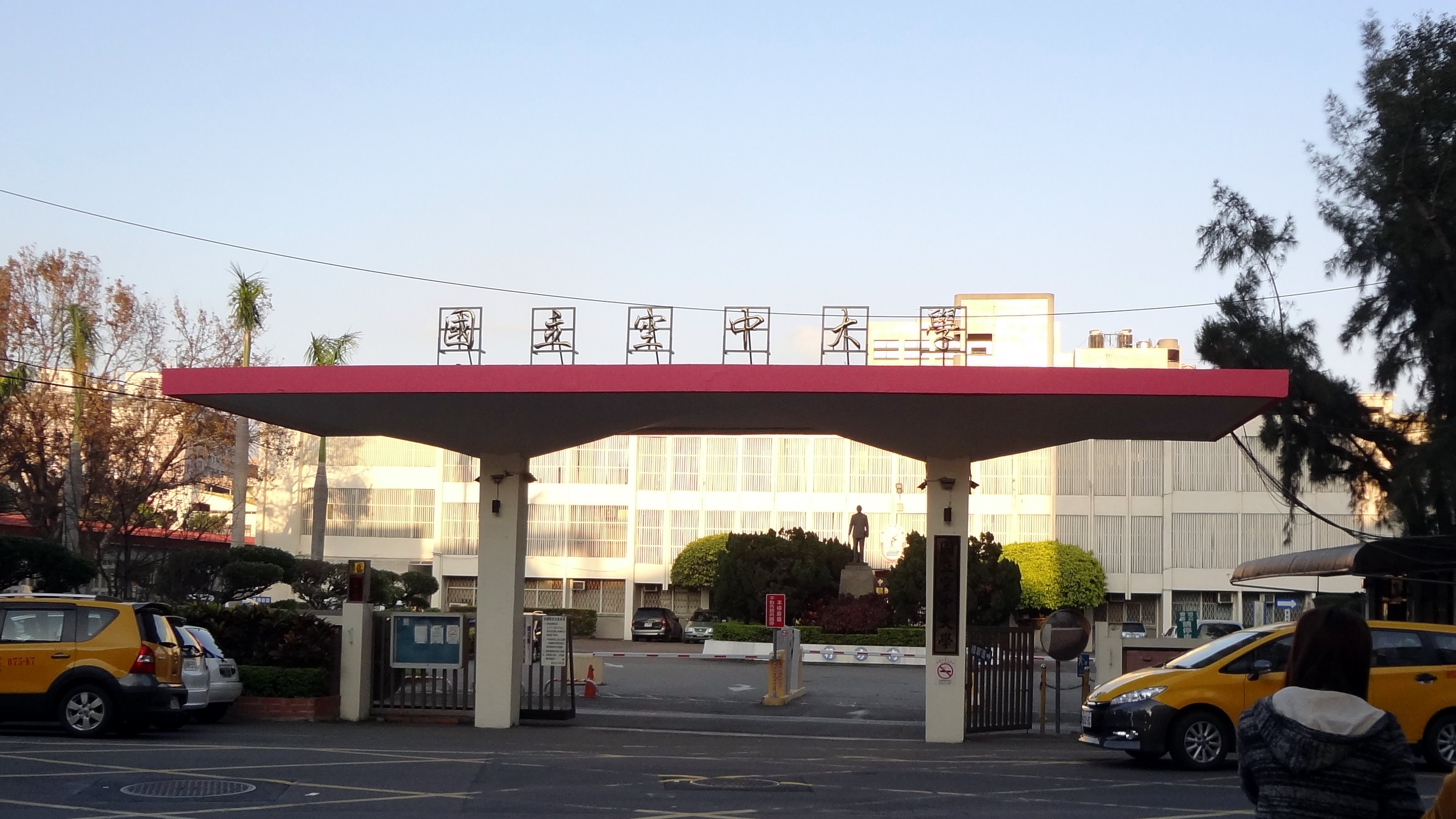
- Motto: 敦品勵學、敬業樂群
- Established: 1 August 1986; 39 years ago
- Location: Luzhou, New Taipei, Taiwan
- Website: nou.edu.tw

National Open University
- Traditional Chinese: 國立空中大學
Transcriptions
Standard Mandarin
- Hanyu Pinyin: Guólì Kōngzhōng Dàxué

National Open University (NOU; Chinese: 國立空中大學) is an open university in Luzhou District, New Taipei, Taiwan.

The university offers undergraduate, postgraduate and professional courses in various fields of study such as Arts, Management Sciences, Education, Health Sciences, Law, Agriculture, and Social Sciences.

== History ==
National Open University was established on 1 August 1986. The opening ceremony and first year courses started in November 1986. Although the university originally had entrance examinations, they were later abolished in 1997. Classes were originally conducted over a dedicated radio station, and television channel and internet classroom were later added. Today, the university is a full-service, distance learning university fully accredited by the Taiwanese government, and has an annual enrollment of 35,000 students.

== Faculties ==
National Open University is headed by a president. The University contain six academic departments.

- Department of Business
- Department of Liberal Arts
- Department of Living Sciences
- Department of Management and Information
- Department of Public Administration
- Department of Social Sciences

== Alumni ==
- Chen Fu-hai, Magistrate of Kinmen County
- Wang Chien-fa, Magistrate of Penghu County (2005–2014)

== Transportation ==
NOU is located southeast of Luzhou Station of Taipei Metro, within walking distance.

== See also ==
- List of universities in Taiwan
- List of open universities
