= Luzhou District, New Taipei =

District in New Taipei, Taiwan

Luzhou 蘆洲區 Roshū
- District
- Luzhou District
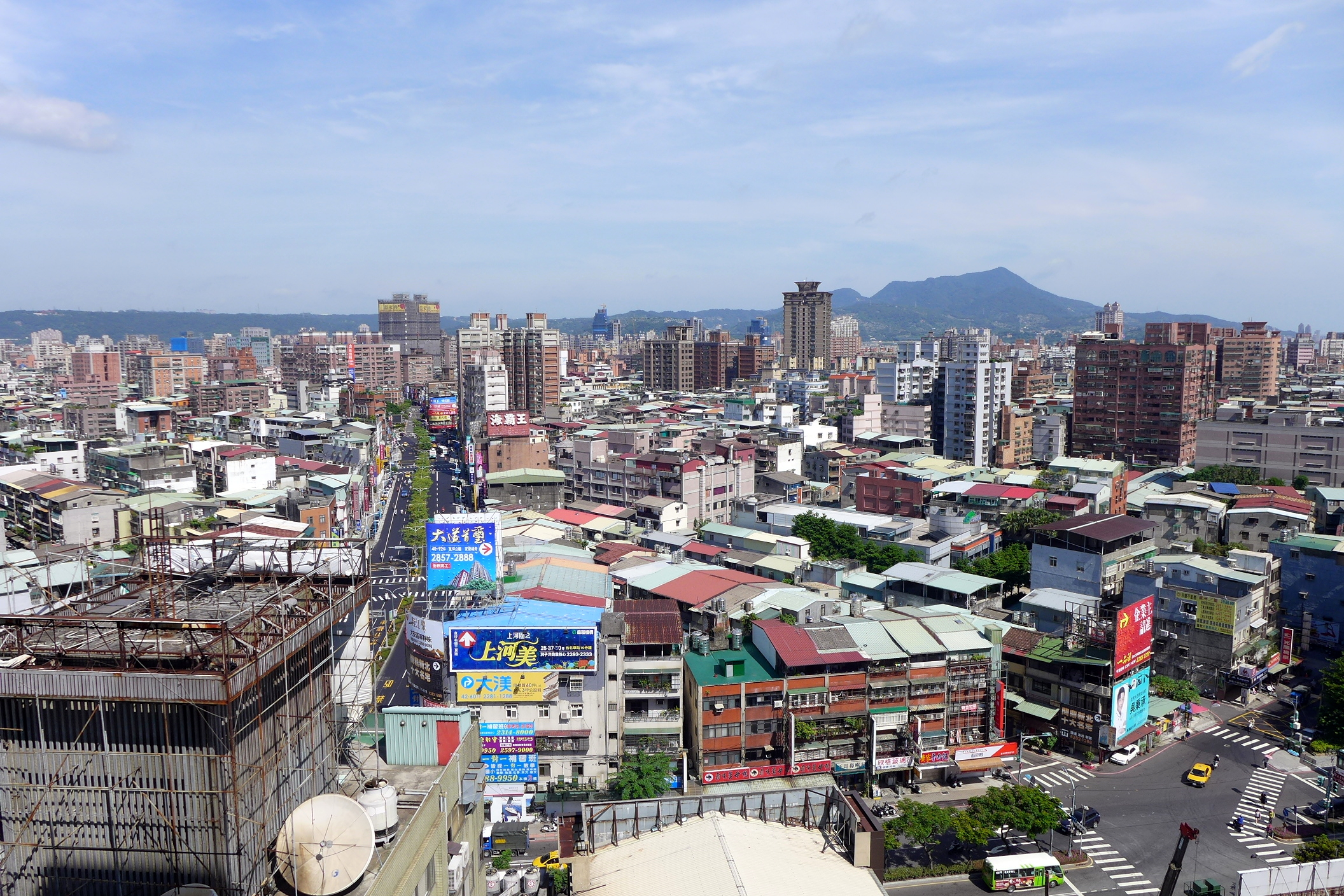

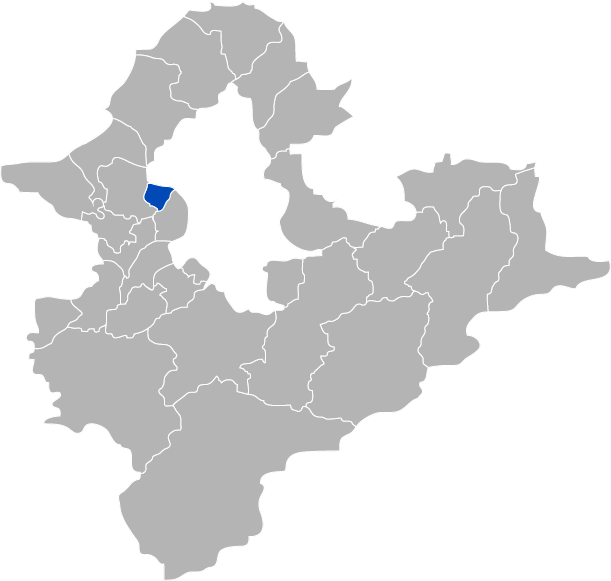
- Luzhou District in New Taipei City
- Coordinates: 25°05′N 121°28′E
- Country: Republic of China (Taiwan)
- Special municipality: New Taipei City

Population (February 2023)
  - Total: 200,092
- Time zone: +8
- Website: www.luzhou.ntpc.gov.tw (in Chinese)

Luzhou District (Chinese: 蘆洲區; Hanyu Pinyin: Lúzhōu Qū; Tongyong Pinyin: Lújhou Cyu; Pe̍h-ōe-jī: Lô·-chiu-khu) is an inner city district in northwestern New Taipei City, Taiwan. It is the second smallest district in New Taipei City after Yonghe District.

== History ==
Historically the area was called Lō·-chiu (鷺州) and Hê-siūⁿ-chiu (和尙州). On 6 October 1997, Luzhou was upgraded from a rural township to a county-administered city (Chinese: 蘆洲市; pinyin: Lúzhōu Shì; Pe̍h-ōe-jī: Lô·-chiu Chhī; postal: Loochow) in the former Taipei County. On 25 December 2010, Taipei County was upgraded to New Taipei City, subsequently Luzhou was upgraded into a district.

== Geography ==
It has an area of 7.4351 km^{2} and a population of 199,964 people in 74,056 households as of May 2022. Luzhou has the second highest population density in Taiwan (after Yonghe) and 13th in the world, with over 26,600 people per km^{2}.

== Administrative divisions ==
The district comprises 38 villages: Baohe (保和), Baoxin (保新), Baoyou (保佑), Changan (長安), Chenggong (成功), Deren (得仁), Desheng (得勝), Fuan (福安), Fuxing (復興), Guanghua (光華), Guangming (光明), Hengde (恆德), Jiouqiong (九芎), Loucuo (樓厝), Lujiang (鷺江), Minhe (民和), Nangang (南港), Ren’ai (仁愛), Rende (仁德), Renfu (仁復), Renyi (仁義), Shuihe (水河), Shuinan (水湳), Shude (樹德), Xiqian (溪墘), Xinyi (信義), Yanping (延平), Yongde (永德), Yongan (永安), Yongkang (永康), Yongle (永樂), Yuqing (玉清), Zhengyi (正義), Zhonghua (中華), Zhonglu (中路), Zhongxiao (忠孝), Zhongyi (忠義), Zhongyuan (中原).

== Education ==
- National Open University
- St. Ignatius High School
- Sanmin Senior High School

== Tourist attractions ==
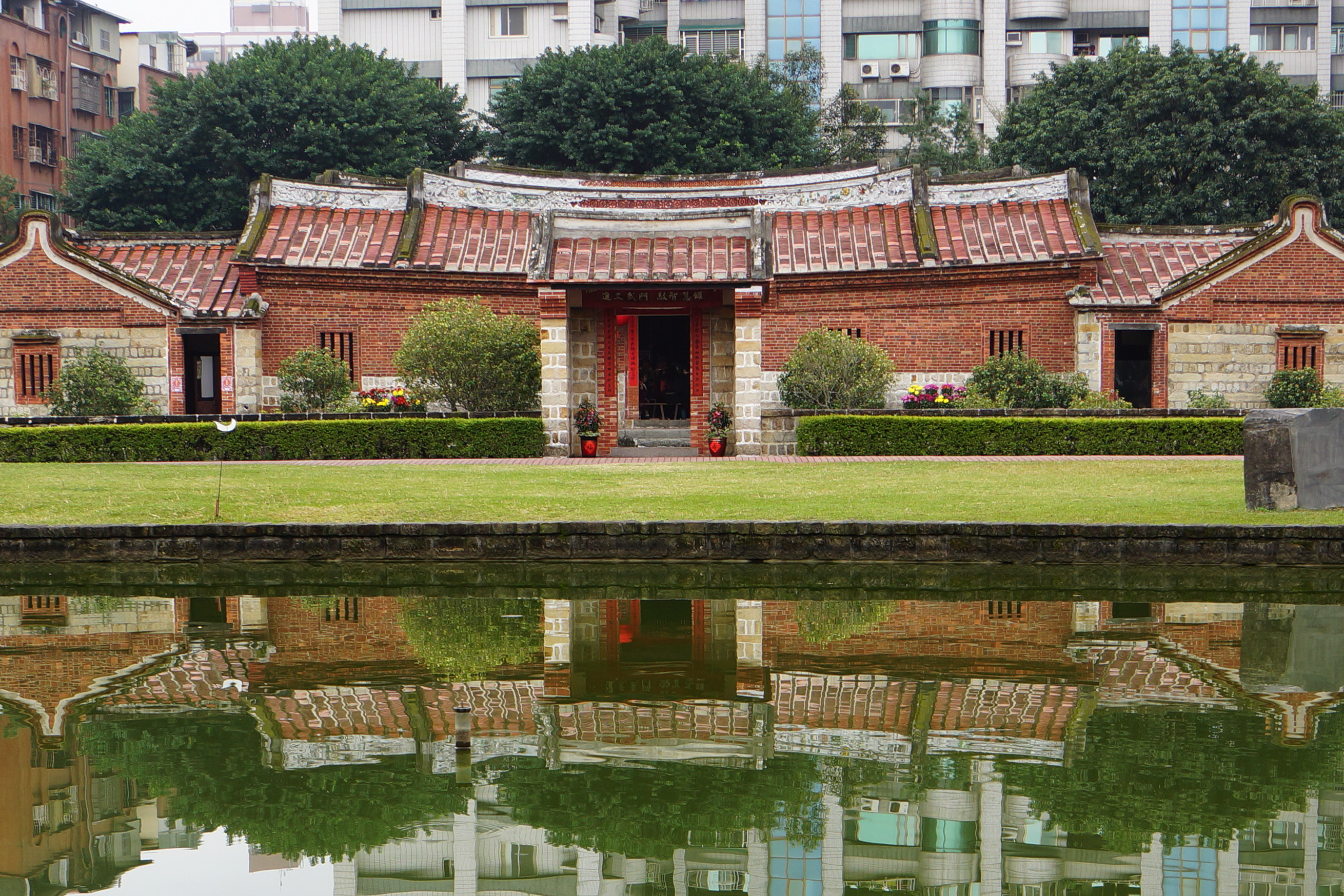
The Luzhou Lee Family Historic Estate

- New Taipei Metropolitan Park
- The Luzhou Lee Family Historic Estate (蘆洲李宅)
- St. Ignatius Plaza (徐匯廣場)
- Luzhou Night Market
- Yong-Lian Temple
- Forbidden City Museum (紫禁城博物館)

== Transportation ==
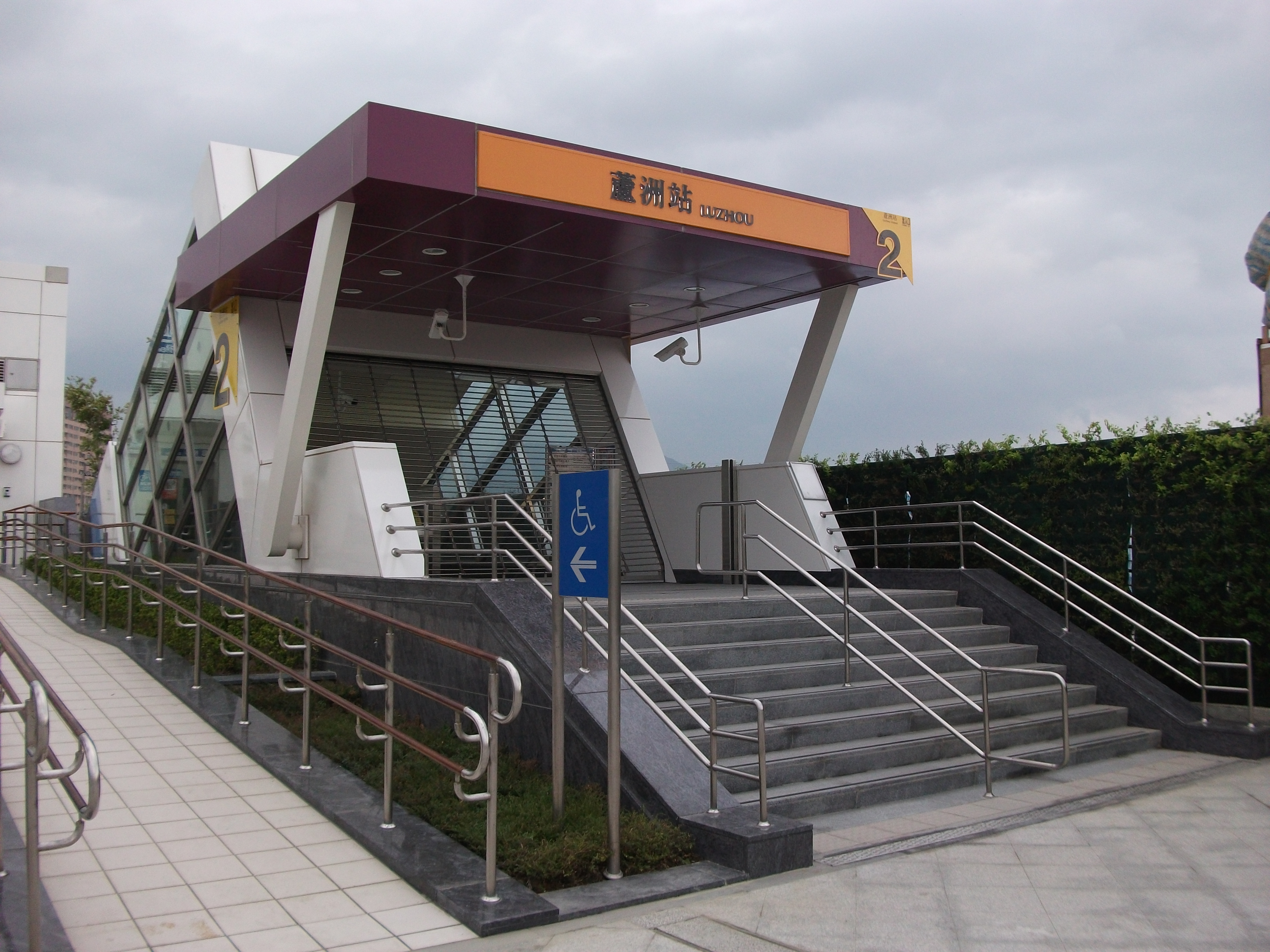
Luzhou Station

The Orange Line of the Taipei Metro serves Luzhou with St. Ignatius High School metro station, Sanmin Senior High School metro station, and Luzhou metro station.

The Circular line will serve Luzhou in the future.

== Notable natives ==
- Cheer Chen, singer
- Holger Chen, Internet celebrity
- Lin Rong-san, founder of Liberty Times
- Lin Yu-lin, real estate developer
- Tia Lee, singer, actress and model
