= Zhonghe–Xinlu Line =

Metro line in Taipei, Taiwan

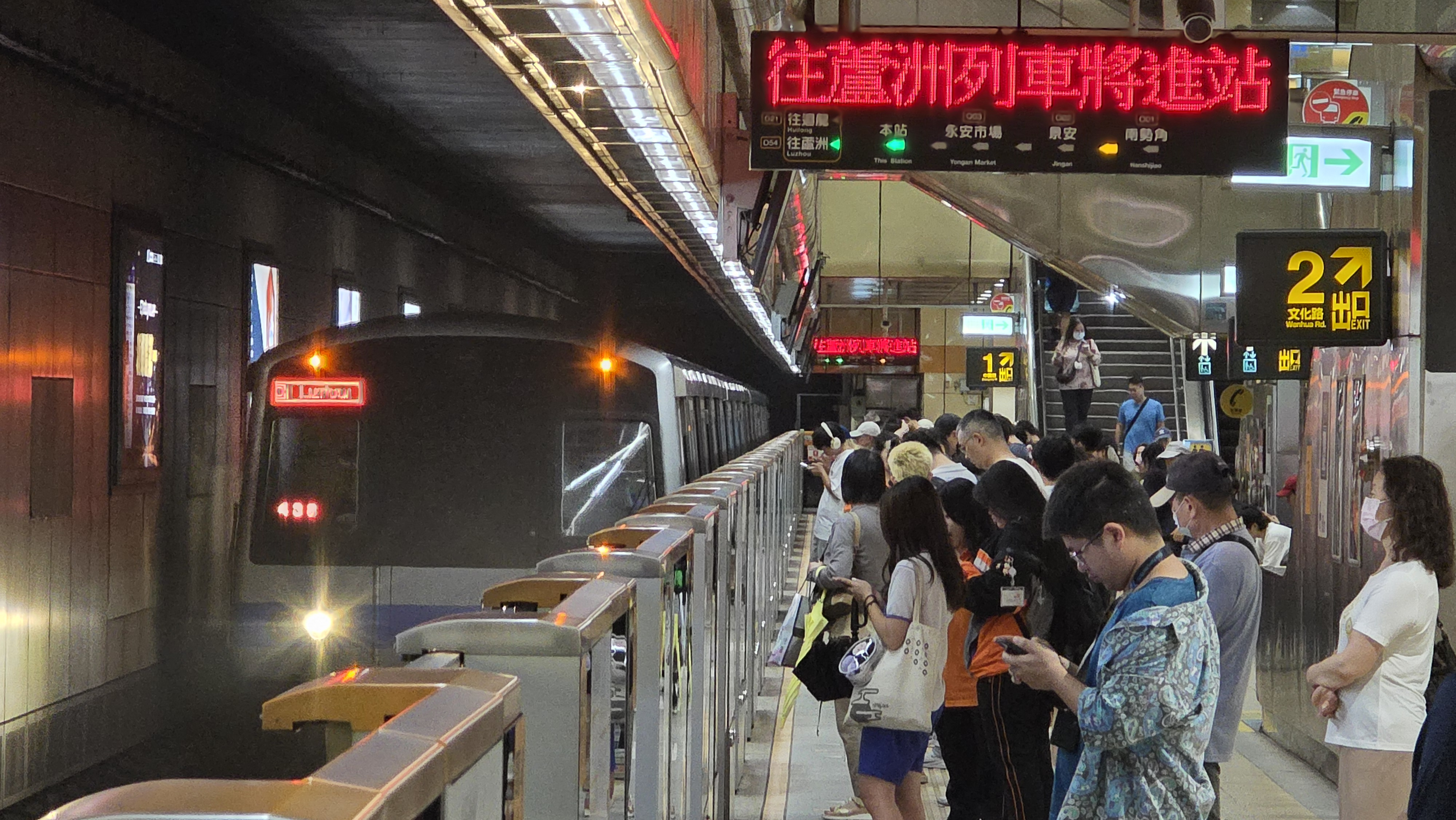
- A refurbished C371 at Dingxi station (shot on August 13, 2026)

Overview
- Other name: Orange Line
- Native name: 中和新蘆線
- Status: In service
- Owner: Taipei DORTS
- Line number: O
- Locale: Taipei and New Taipei, Taiwan
- Termini: Nanshijiao; Huilong or Luzhou
- Stations: 26
- Color on map: Orange

Service
- Type: Rapid transit
- System: Taipei Metro
- Services: Nanshijiao–Huilong (Xinzhuang branch); Nanshijiao–Luzhou (Luzhou branch)
- Operator: Taipei Rapid Transit Corporation
- Depots: Zhonghe; Luzhou; Xinzhuang
- Rolling stock: C371 (6-car)

History
- Opened: 24 December 1998; 27 years ago
- Last extension: 2013

Technical
- Line length: 29.3 km (18.2 mi)
- Character: Underground
- Track gauge: 1,435 mm (4 ft 8 1/2 in) standard gauge
- Electrification: 750 V DC third rail
- Operating speed: 80 km/h (50 mph)

Zhonghe–Xinlu Line
- Traditional Chinese: 中和新蘆線
- Simplified Chinese: 中和新芦线
- Literal meaning: Central and new reed line
Transcriptions
Standard Mandarin
- Hanyu Pinyin: Zhōnghé–Xīnlú Xiàn
Hakka
- Pha̍k-fa-sṳ: Chûng-fò–Sîn-lù Sien
Southern Min
- Tâi-lô: Tiong-hô–Sin-lô͘ Soàⁿ

Orange Line
- Traditional Chinese: 橘線
- Simplified Chinese: 橘线
Transcriptions
Standard Mandarin
- Hanyu Pinyin: Jú Xiàn
Hakka
- Pha̍k-fa-sṳ: Chhâng Sien

The Zhonghe–Xinlu Line (Chinese: 中和新蘆線), also known as Orange Line (Chinese: 橘線), is a metro line in Taipei operated by the Taipei Metro, named after the districts it connects: Zhonghe, Xinzhuang and Luzhou. The line starts at Nanshijiao in Zhonghe, passes through central Taipei, then splits into two branches: one to Huilong via Xinzhuang and one to Luzhou.

The southern section between Nanshijiao and Guting opened in 1998. It was then connected to the Tamsui Line. Due to heavy traffic for residents in the districts of Luzhou and Sanchong travelling in and out of central Taipei, a metro line was planned to meet this urgent need. The line would eventually consist of two branches which connects to Guting via central Taipei. The extension fully opened in 2012.

The entire line, with the exception of the Luzhou and Xinzhuang maintenance depots, is underground.

== History ==
In June 1992, the construction of the Zhonghe Line began. It was the most difficult to construct among all lines of the Taipei Metro. The tunnels running through Zhonghe-Yonghe area had to pass under narrow streets, skyscrapers and crowded blocks, with limited spaces for stations above ground. As a result, the whole neighborhood traffic had its so-called "Dark Ages" when the cut-and-cover method was used for station platforms, concourses and crossovers during the 1990s. Besides the river-crossing section, the work suffered from biogas below the waterfront. After the construction, Zhonghe Line became more costly than all the other lines, NT$6.249 billion per kilometer.

Since the line opened for service on 24 December 1998, it has been the most important access to downtown Taipei for nearly half a million of commuters who live in the district. Until 2012, Zhonghe Line trains ran through services onto the Tamsui Line to Beitou station.

On 15 January 2011, Dongmen station was still under construction while the track for the section from Zhongxiao Xinsheng to Guting via Dongmen had already been laid. At the time, Taipei Rapid Transit Corporation Vice Bureau Chief Chang Pei-yi noted that there was a possibility of opening the line for service while skipping both Dongmen and Guting stations, thus allowing for through service on the Orange Line. However, this did not occur. The section opened for service on 30 September 2012 along with Dongmen Station.

On 18 December 2011, the 8.2 km (5.1 mi) Daqiaotou to Fu Jen University section passed final inspections by the Ministry of Transportation and Communications. It opened for service on 5 January 2012. On its first full day of service, the line served 82,000 passengers. The line is expected to serve 100,000 passengers daily.

Although the branch line was called the Luzhou Branch Line during construction, the name was changed to simply the Luzhou Line before it opened for service.

- 2002: The Luzhou and Xinzhuang lines begin construction as part of Phase II of the Taipei Metro.
- September 2007: Track laying begins for the Luzhou Line.
- 25 September 2008: Since track laying has been completed for the Luzhou Line, tracks are laid for the segment of the Xinzhuang Line within Taipei.
- 1 April 2009: Train testing begins for the Luzhou Line and the segment of the Xinzhuang Line within Taipei.
- 22 August 2009: It is announced that although the line was to come into operation before the Spring Festival of 2010, due to malfunctions in the Neihu Line, service for the line would be pushed back to September 2010.
- 24 April 2009: The Department of Rapid Transit Systems (DORTS) denies saying that the line would open before the Spring Festival in 2010. The Executive Yuan sets the line to begin service by 31 December 2010. DORTS says it will push forward with an anticipated September 2010 opening date.
- 2 March 2010: DORTS says that the line is planned to open by 1 September 2010 in order to coincide with the Flora Expo and will use the Taoyuan Airport MRT's power as backup, so that by November 2010 the Xinzhuang Line can begin train testing through Touqianzhuang.
- May 2010: Construction for Sanchong Elementary School, Sanhe Junior High School, Luzhou, and Luzhou Depot is completed. Construction for Sanmin Senior High School and St. Ignatius High School is near completion.
- 30 June 2010: Construction completes on all stations.
- July 2010: Train testing begins.
- September 4–5, 2010: The Luzhou Line and Xinzhuang Line Taipei City portion to Zhongxiao Xinsheng undergoes initial public testing.
- 3 November 2010: The line opens for service with the opening of the Luzhou to Zhongxiao Xinsheng section. A free trial period for the line ran until 2 December 2010.
- 3 December 2010: The Luzhou to Zhongxiao Xinsheng began revenue service.
- 5 January 2012: The Xinzhuang Line New Taipei City from Fu Jen University to Daqiaotou Station opened for a free trial period for a month.
- 5 February 2012: The Fu Jen University to Daqiaotou section began revenue service.
- 29 September 2012: Last day of the Beitou–Nanshijiao route upon opening of Dongmen station.
- 30 September 2012: The Guting–Zhongxiao Xinsheng section opened for a free trial period for a month connecting the Zhonghe Line to the Xinlu Line. Zhonghe Line passengers traveling to Tamsui Line had to change trains at Guting and would also get a 30% discount for a month.
- 30 October 2012: The Guting–Zhongxiao Xinsheng section began revenue service.
- 29 June 2013: The Xinzhuang Line was extended from Fu Jen University Station to Huilong Station. A free trial period for the Fu Jen University–Huilong began for a month.
- 29 July 2013: The extension to Huilong began revenue service.
- 14 January 2021: Xinzhuang Depot fully completed and begins operations. Its construction was severely delayed over a controversy regarding eminent domain of part of the historic Losheng Sanatorium property.

== Impact ==
Since its first three weeks after opening, the line (along with the Xinzhuang Line section) had reached a total ridership of over 3 million passengers, with an average of 157,000 passengers per day. It is expected to cut travel time between Luzhou and Taipei by at least half, with travel time between Luzhou and Taipei Main Station cut down to 17 minutes. The system surpassed an annual ridership of 500 million for the first time on 29 December 2010, widely attributed to the opening of the new line. The line has been effective in relieving congestion, with a 24% increase in average vehicle speed crossing Taipei Bridge (to Taipei) during rush hour since the opening of the line. During the initial one-month trial, bus routes that ran parallel to the metro route experienced a 40% decrease in ridership, although bus ridership is expected to rise again after the end of the free trial.

In anticipation of the opening of the new line, property prices along the route have risen by 36% since 2008. Although small businesses along the line (most notably in Zhongshan and Datong, two older districts) have benefited from increased business during the free trial period, analysts noted that the initial business boon may only be short-lived and it may be years before these areas see real benefits as a result of the new line.

== Services ==
As of December 2017, the typical off-peak service is:

- 7 trains per hour (tph) between Huilong and Nanshijiao
- 7 tph between Luzhou and Nanshijiao

== Stations ==
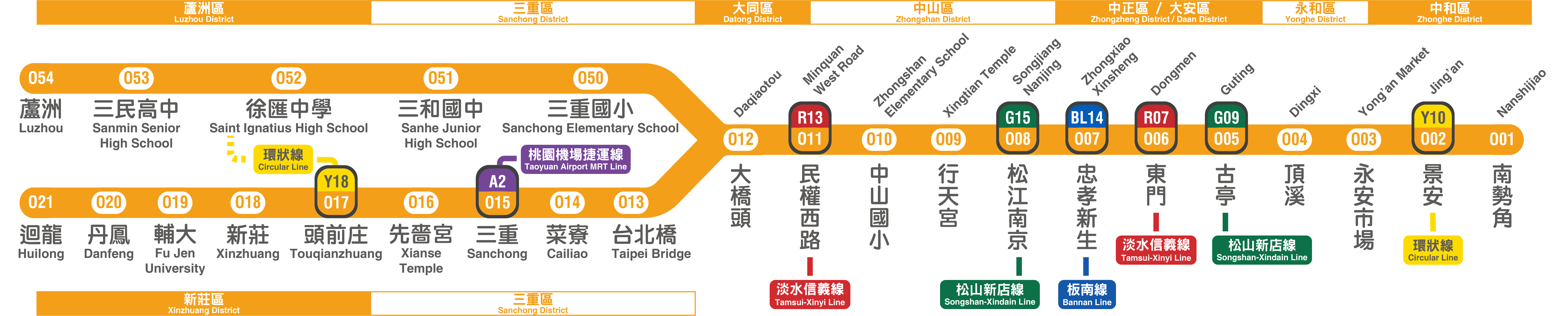

Code	Station name	Station type		Locale		Stat. distance (km)		Opened date	Transfer
Code	Station name	Structure	Platform	Locale		Previous	Total	Opened date	Transfer
Zhonghe–Xinlu Line (Nanshijiao–Daqiaotou–Huilong)
O01	Nanshijiao 南勢角	Underground	Island	Zhonghe	New Taipei	—N/a	0.00	1998-12-24	—N/a
O02	Jingan 景安	Underground	Split	Zhonghe	New Taipei	0.81	0.81	1998-12-24	Circular line
O03	Yongan Market 永安市場	Underground	Split	Zhonghe	New Taipei	1.08	1.89	1998-12-24	—N/a
O04	Dingxi 頂溪	Underground	Island	Yonghe	New Taipei	1.33	3.22	1998-12-24	—N/a
O05	Guting 古亭	Underground	Island/Split	Zhongzheng	Taipei	2.14	5.36	1998-12-24	Songshan–Xindian Line
O06	Dongmen 東門	Underground	Island/Split	Daan	Taipei	1.58	6.94	2012-9-30	Tamsui–Xinyi Line
O07	Zhongxiao Xinsheng 忠孝新生	Underground	Island	Zhongzheng	Taipei	1.20	8.14	2010-11-3	Bannan Line
O08	Songjiang Nanjing 松江南京	Underground	Island	Zhongshan	Taipei	1.14	9.28	2010-11-3	Songshan–Xindian Line
O09	Xingtian Temple 行天宮	Underground	Island	Zhongshan	Taipei	0.80	10.08	2010-11-3	Minsheng–Xizhi line
O10	Zhongshan Elementary School 中山國小	Underground	Island	Zhongshan	Taipei	0.95	11.03	2010-11-3	—N/a
O11	Minquan West Road 民權西路	Underground	Island	Datong	Taipei	0.71	11.74	2010-11-3	Tamsui–Xinyi Line
O12	Daqiaotou 大橋頭	Underground	Island	Datong	Taipei	0.66	12.40	2010-11-3	For Luzhou; Shezi Line
O13	Taipei Bridge 台北橋	Underground	Split	Sanchong	New Taipei	1.33	13.73	2012-1-5	—N/a
O14	Cailiao 菜寮	Underground	Island	Sanchong	New Taipei	0.99	14.72	2012-1-5	—N/a
O15	Sanchong 三重	Underground	Island	Sanchong	New Taipei	0.87	15.59	2012-1-5	Taoyuan Airport MRT
O16	Xianse Temple 先嗇宮	Underground	Island	Sanchong	New Taipei	1.72	17.31	2012-1-5	—N/a
O17	Touqianzhuang 頭前庄	Underground	Island	Xinzhuang	New Taipei	1.27	18.58	2012-1-5	Circular line
O18	Xinzhuang 新莊	Underground	Island	Xinzhuang	New Taipei	1.02	19.60	2012-1-5	—N/a
O19	Fu Jen University 輔大	Underground	Island	Xinzhuang	New Taipei	1.74	21.34	2012-1-5	Wugu-Taishan LRT
O20	Danfeng 丹鳳	Underground	Island	Xinzhuang	New Taipei	1.37	22.71	2013-6-29	—N/a
O21	Huilong 迴龍	Underground	Island	Xinzhuang	New Taipei	1.40	24.11	2013-6-29	Wanda–Shulin Line; Brown line
Zhonghe–Xinlu Line (Daqiaotou–Luzhou)
O12	Daqiaotou 大橋頭	Underground	Island	Datong	Taipei	—N/a	0.00	2010-11-3	For Huilong; Shezi Line
O50	Sanchong Elementary School 三重國小	Underground	Island	Sanchong	New Taipei	1.88	1.88	2010-11-3	—N/a
O51	Sanhe Junior High School 三和國中	Underground	Island	Sanchong	New Taipei	1.23	3.11	2010-11-3	—N/a
O52	St. Ignatius High School 徐匯中學	Underground	Island	Luzhou	New Taipei	0.83	3.94	2010-11-3	Circular Line
O53	Sanmin Senior High School 三民高中	Underground	Island	Luzhou	New Taipei	0.90	4.84	2010-11-3	—N/a
O54	Luzhou 蘆洲	Underground	Island	Luzhou	New Taipei	1.17	6.01	2010-11-3	Wugu-Taishan LRT
