= Huilong metro station =

Metro station in Taiwan

Huilong /LG21 迴龍
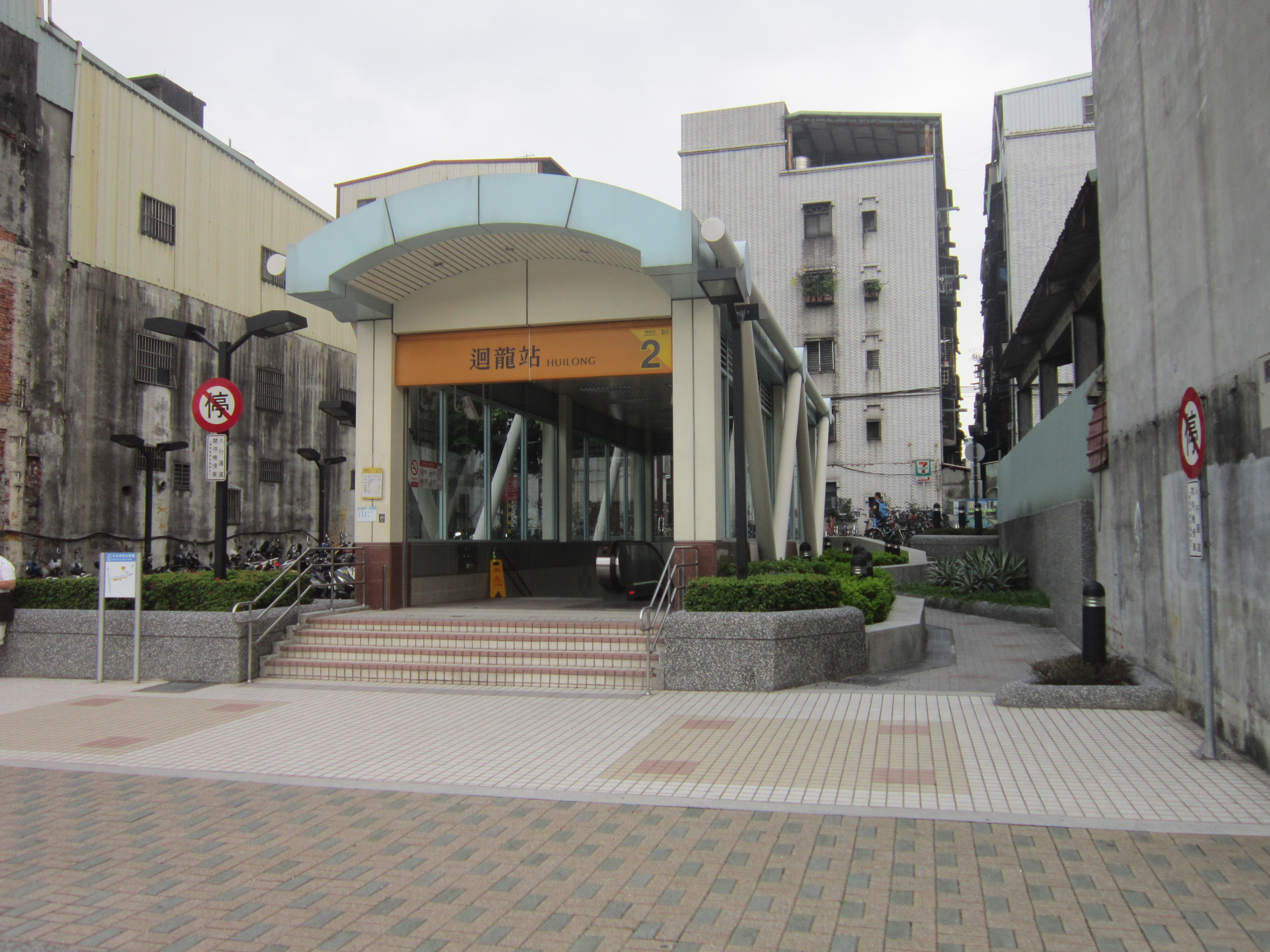

Chinese name
- Traditional Chinese: 迴龍
- Simplified Chinese: 回龙
Transcriptions
Standard Mandarin
- Hanyu Pinyin: Huílóng
- Bopomofo: ㄏㄨㄟˊㄌㄨㄥˊ
Hakka
- Pha̍k-fa-sṳ: Fì-liùng
Southern Min
- Tâi-lô: Huê-liông

General information
- Location: Xinzhuang and Guishan District, Taoyuan City, New Taipei; Taiwan
- Coordinates: 25.0220862°N 121.4118979°E
- Operator: Taipei Metro
- Lines: Zhonghe–Xinlu line (O21); Wanda–Zhonghe–Shulin line (LG21)

Construction
- Structure type: Underground ( Zhonghe–Xinlu line); Elevated ( Wanda–Zhonghe–Shulin line)

Other information
- Station code: / LG21

History
- Opened: 29 June 2013

Passengers
- 22,802 daily (December 2024) (Ranked of 119)
- Rank: 81 out of 109

Services
Preceding station	Taipei Metro	Following station
Danfeng towards Nanshijiao	Zhonghe–Xinlu line	Terminus
Sanjiaopu towards Chiang Kai-shek Memorial Hall	Wanda–Shulin line Future service	Terminus
Location

The Taipei Metro Huilong station is a station on the Zhonghe–Xinlu line located in Xinzhuang, New Taipei City, and the Huilong section of Guishan District, Taoyuan City, Taiwan. It is the western terminus of the Xinzhuang Line and opened on June 29, 2013. It will be a terminus on the Wanda–Zhonghe–Shulin line in June 2031.

== Station overview ==
This two-level, underground station has an island platform. It is located beneath Zhongzheng Rd. near Losheng Sanatorium, adjoining the Xinzhuang Depot.

=== Construction ===
Excavation depth for this station is around 17 meters. It is 260 meters in length and 19.55 meters wide. The platform is 251.5 meters long. It has three entrances, one accessibility elevator, and four vent shafts. It has one emergency exit.

== Station layout ==
Street level	Entrance/exit	Entrance/exit
B1	Concourse	Lobby, information desk, automatic ticket dispensing machines, one-way faregates
B1	Concourse	Restrooms (inside fare zone, outside fare zone near exit 1)
B2	Platform 1	Zhonghe–Xinlu line toward Nanshijiao (O20 Danfeng) →
B2	Island platform, doors will open on the left/ right
B2	Platform 2	Zhonghe–Xinlu line toward Nanshijiao (O20 Danfeng) →

== Around the station ==
- Losheng Sanatorium
- Danfeng Senior High School
- Danfeng Elementary School
- Huilong Junior High & Elementary School
- Lunghwa University of Science and Technology
- Taipei Metro Xinzhuang Depot
