= Luzhou metro station =

Metro station in New Taipei, Taiwan

Luzhou / F05 蘆洲
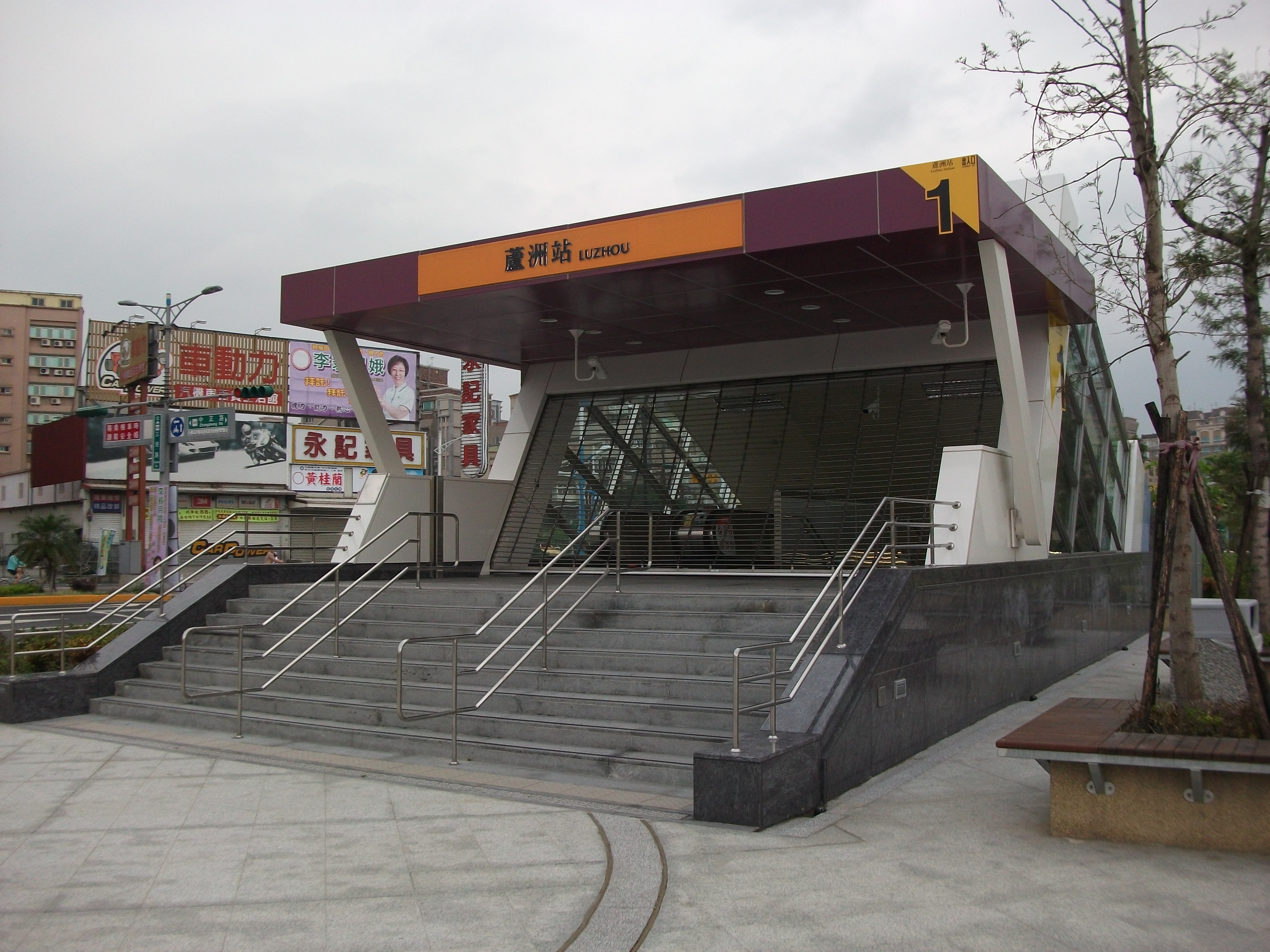

Chinese name
- Traditional Chinese: 蘆洲
- Simplified Chinese: 芦洲
Transcriptions
Standard Mandarin
- Hanyu Pinyin: Lúzhōu
- Bopomofo: ㄌㄨˊㄓㄡ
Hakka
- Pha̍k-fa-sṳ: Lù-chû
Southern Min
- Tâi-lô: Lôo-tsiu

General information
- Other names: The Luzhou Lee Family Historic Estate (蘆洲李宅)
- Location: B1, No. 386, Sanmin Rd. Luzhou, New Taipei; Taiwan
- Coordinates: 25.091528°N 121.464452°E
- System: Metro station
- Owner: Taipei DORTS
- Operator: Taipei Rapid Transit Corporation
- Lines: Zhonghe–Xinlu line Wugu-Taishan LRT (planned)
- Platforms: 1 island
- Connections: Bus stop

Construction
- Structure type: Underground
- Accessible: Yes

Other information
- Station code: / F05

History
- Opened: 3 November 2010; 15 years ago

Passengers
- 28,967 daily (December 2024)
- Rank: 65 out of 109

Services
Preceding station	Taipei Metro	Following station
Sanmin Senior High School towards Nanshijiao	Zhonghe–Xinlu line	Terminus
Location

Luzhou station (Chinese: 蘆洲站) is the terminal station on Taipei Metro's Zhonghe–Xinlu line, located in Luzhou, New Taipei, Taiwan.

== Station overview ==
This two-level, underground station is located at the intersection of Sanmin Road and Zhongzheng Road. It opened on 3 November 2010.

It is the busiest station on the Luzhou Line, handling over 19,000 passengers per day two weeks after opening, and increasing to over 28,700 per day by the end of November 2010.

=== Construction ===
Excavation depth for the station is around 24 meters. The station is 216 meters in length and 21 meters in width. It has three entrances, one elevator for the disabled, and two vent shafts.

== Public artwork ==
The theme for the station is "Dancing in the Wind", part of a common theme of egrets for the Luzhou Branch Line. The main lobby features a dome skylight with a piece of public art resembling a dancing egret feather. Natural light from above makes the feather art appear light and soft.

== Station layout ==
Street level	Entrance/exit	Entrance/exit
B1	Concourse	Lobby, information desk, automatic ticket dispensing machines, one-way faregates
B1	Concourse	Restrooms (inside fare zone, outside fare zone near exit 4)
B2	Platform 1	→ Zhonghe–Xinlu line toward Nanshijiao (O53 Sanmin Senior High School) →
B2	Island platform, doors will open on the left/ right
B2	Platform 2	→ Zhonghe–Xinlu line toward Nanshijiao (O53 Sanmin Senior High School) →

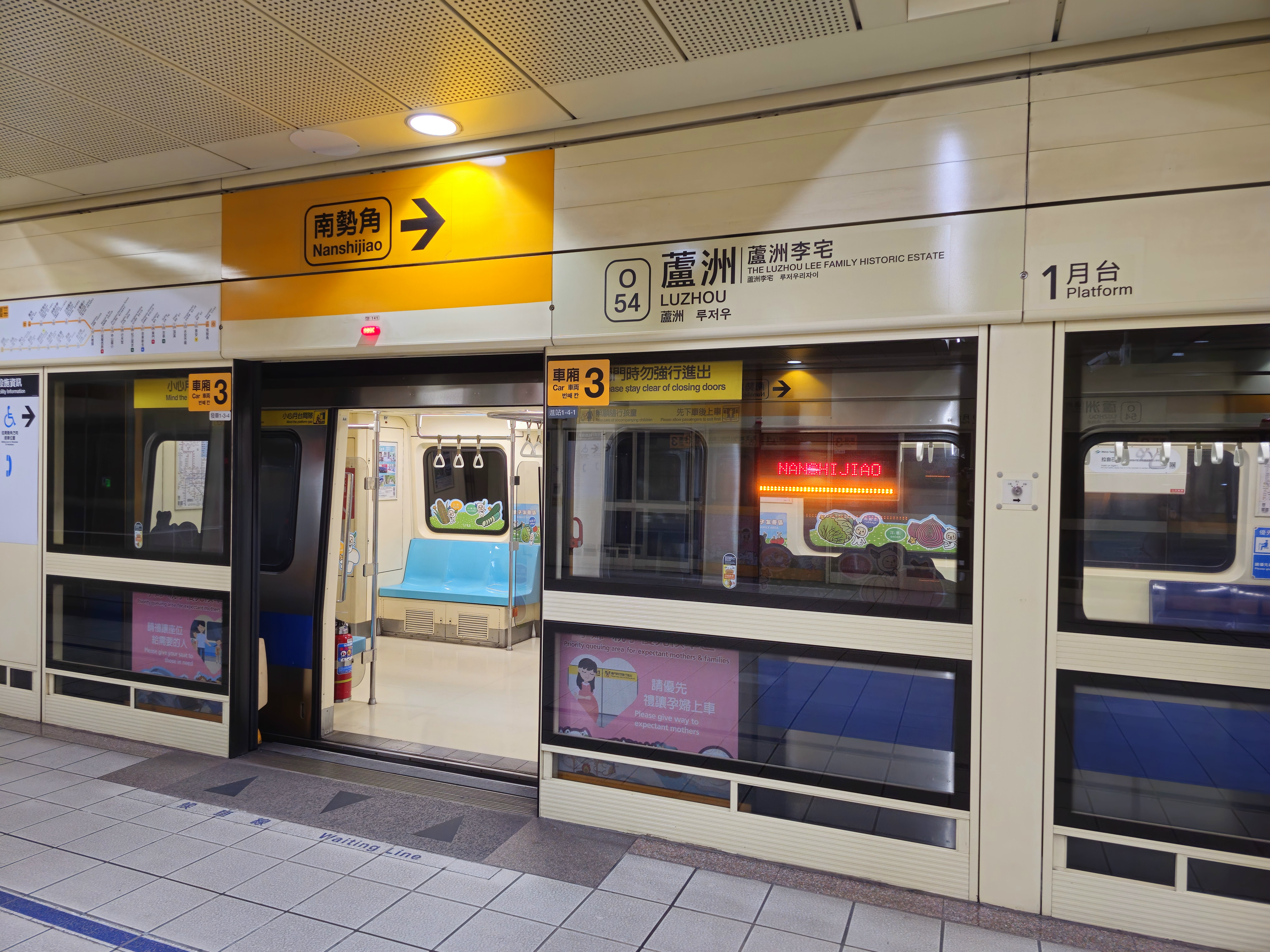
Platform 1

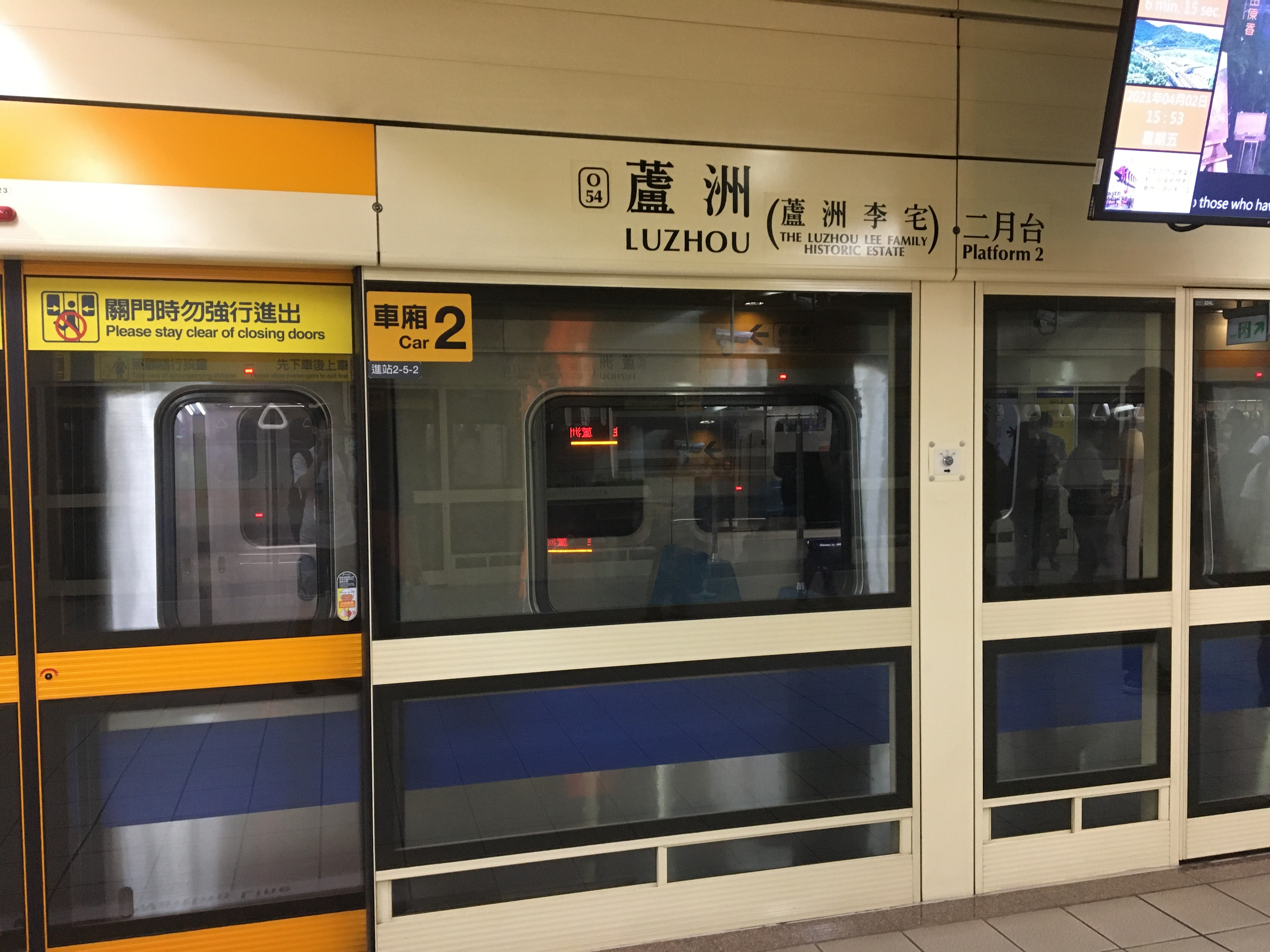
Platform 2

=== Exits ===
- Exit 1: Sanmin Rd.
- Exit 2: Metro Plaza
- Exit 3: Zhongzheng Rd.

== Around the station ==
- National Police Agency New Taipei, Luzhou Branch
- National Open University
- Lujiang Junior High School - exit 4
- Zhongyi Elementary School
- Renai Elementary School
- Luzhou Civil Sport Center
- Uniqlo
- Luzhou Bus Terminal
- The Luzhou Lee Family Historic Estate
