= Nanshijiao metro station =

Metro station in New Taipei, Taiwan

Nanshijiao 南勢角
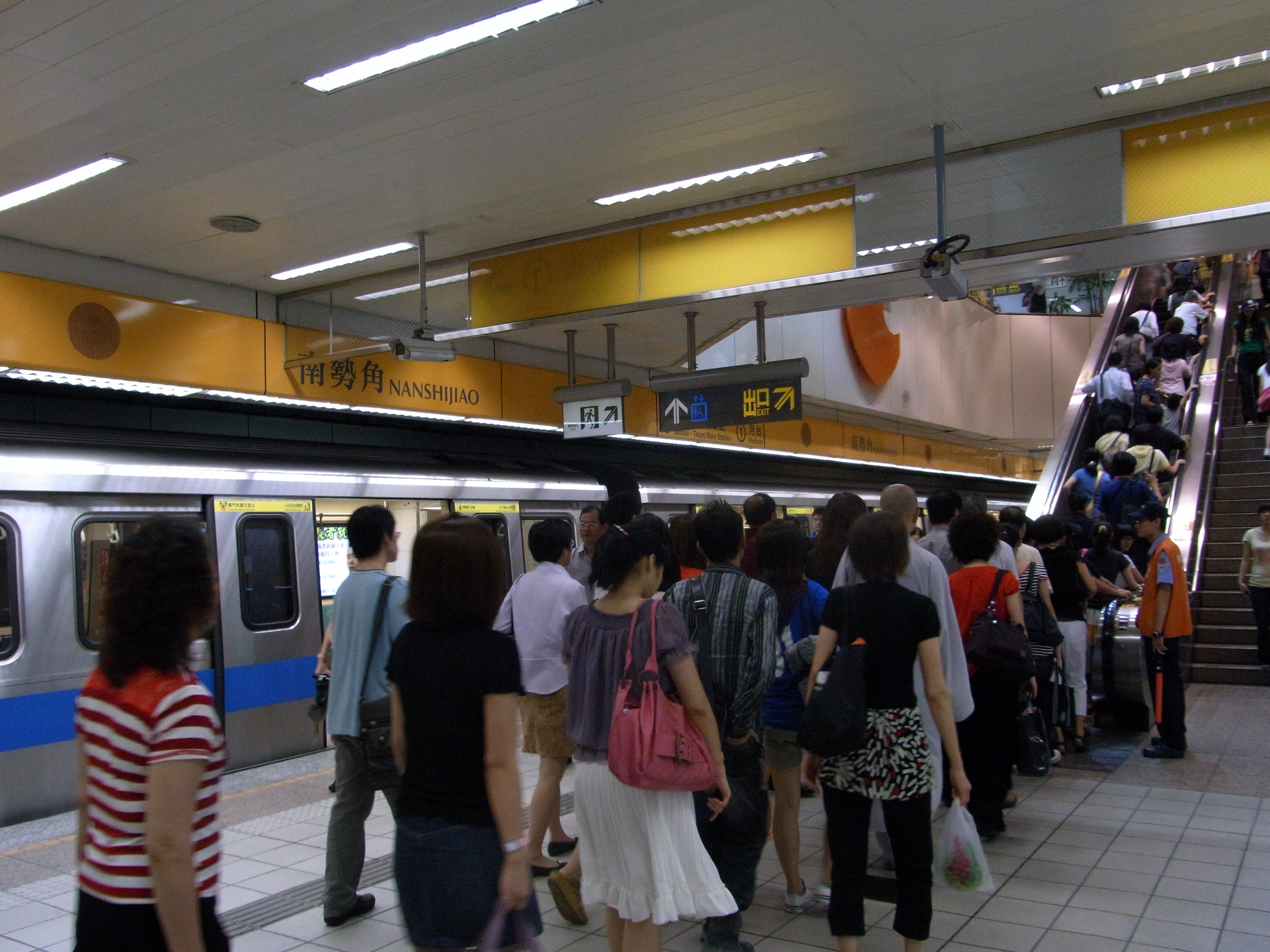
- Platform

Chinese name
- Traditional Chinese: 南勢角
- Simplified Chinese: 南势角
Transcriptions
Standard Mandarin
- Hanyu Pinyin: Nánshìjiǎo
- Bopomofo: ㄋㄢˊ ㄕˋ ㄐㄧㄠˇ
- Wade–Giles: Nan²-shi⁴ Chiao³
Hakka
- Pha̍k-fa-sṳ: Nàm-sṳ-kok
Southern Min
- Tâi-lô: Lâm-sì-kak

General information
- Location: 163 Jieyun Rd; Zhonghe, New Taipei; Taiwan
- Coordinates: 24.9899°N 121.5090°E
- System: Taipei metro station
- Line: Zhonghe–Xinlu line

Construction
- Structure type: Underground
- Cycle facilities: Access available

Other information
- Station code: O01
- Website: web.metro.taipei/e/stationdetail2010.asp?ID=O01-048

History
- Opened: 1998-12-24

Passengers
- 2017: 14.887 million per year ▲0.49%
- Rank: (Ranked 45 of 119)

Services
Preceding station	Taipei Metro	Following station
Terminus	Zhonghe–Xinlu line	Jingan towards Huilong or Luzhou
Location

Nanshijiao (Chinese: 南勢角; pinyin: Nánshìjiǎo, formerly transliterated as Nanshih Chiao Station until 2003) is a metro station in New Taipei, Taiwan, served by the Taipei Metro, on the Zhonghe–Xinlu line. It is built on the site of the old Zhonghe Railway Station, which ceased operations in 1990.

== Station overview ==
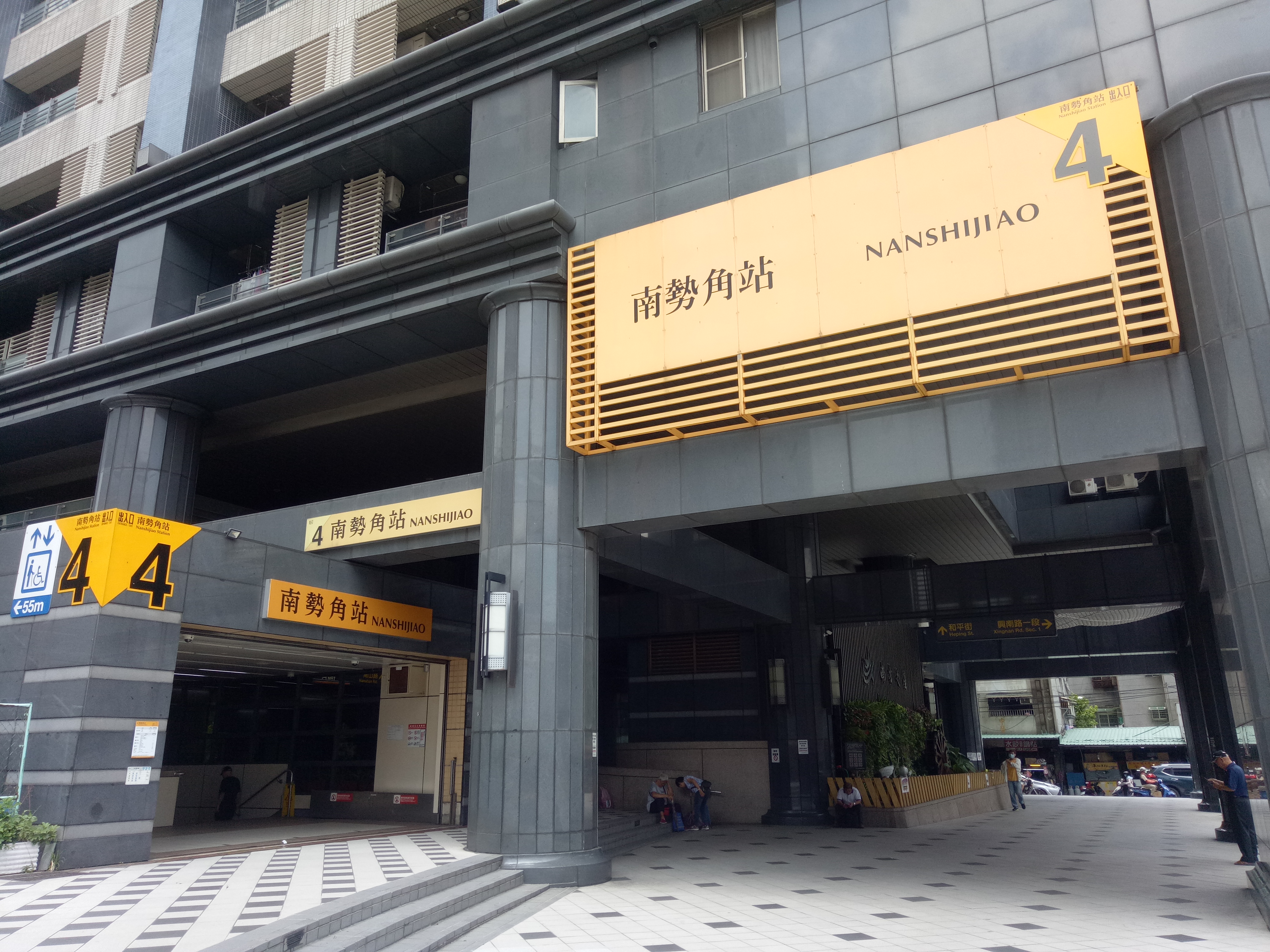
Nanshijiao station exit 4

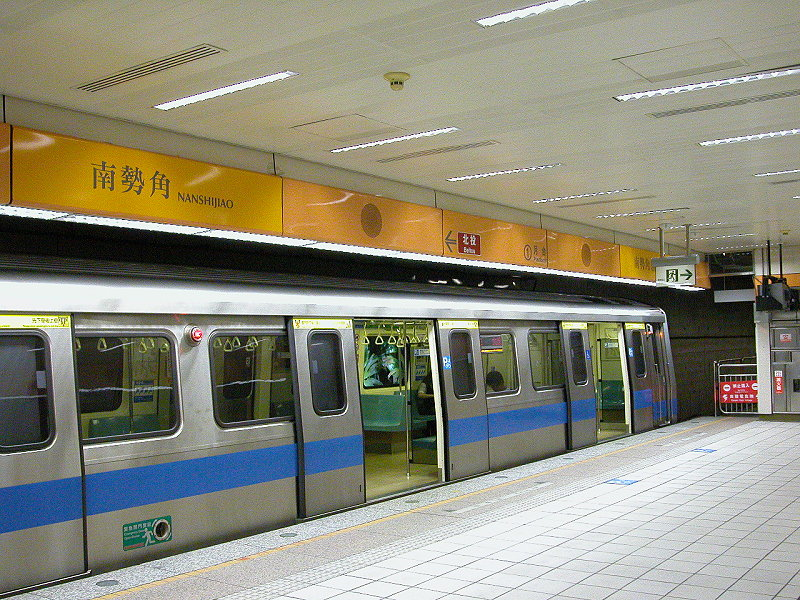
Nanshijiao station platform

This four-level, underground station has an island platform and four exits. The area above the ground is currently being developed into a new high-rise building.

The Taipei Metro Zhonghe Depot is located on the southeast side of the station.

== Public art ==
Art in this station has a theme of "Youth Melody" and cost NT$4,999,000. It includes numerous pieces of colorful public art created by local artist Jun Lai, and was completed on 30 November 1998. Consisting of 12 sculptures (three hung from the ceiling; nine hung on the walls), they symbolize the passion of youth with a light, joyful tone.

== Station layout ==
Street level
Entrance/exit
Entrance/exit
B3
Concourse
Lobby, information desk, automatic ticket dispensing machines, one-way faregates

Restrooms (inside fare zone)

B4
Platform 1
← Zhonghe–Xinlu line toward Luzhou / Huilong (O02 Jingan)
Island platform, doors will open on the left, right
Platform 2
← Zhonghe–Xinlu line toward Luzhou / Huilong (O02 Jingan)

=== Exits ===
- Exit 1: Nanshan Rd.
- Exit 2: Heping St.
- Exit 3: Jieyun Rd.
- Exit 4: Xingnan Rd. Sec.1

== Around the station ==
- Xingnan Night Market
