= Shandao (disambiguation) =

Shandao (613–681) was an influential writer on Pure Land Buddhism.

Shandao may also refer to:

- Shandao Temple, temple in Zhongzheng District, Taipei, Taiwan
- Shandao Temple metro station, the western terminus of the Bannan line operated by the Taipei Metro in Taipei City.
