= West Road =

West Road may be:

- West Road, Cambridge, England
- West Road River, British Columbia, Canada

== See also ==
- East-West road connection, Melbourne, Australia
- Great West Road, London, England
- Great West Road, Zambia
- Great South West Road, A30 road, England
- Minquan West Road Station, Taipei City, Taiwan
- The Road West, an American Western television series
- ZhongXiao West Road, Taipei City, Taiwan
