= The Landis Taipei =

Hotel in Zhongshan, Taipei, Taiwan

- 亞都麗緻大飯店
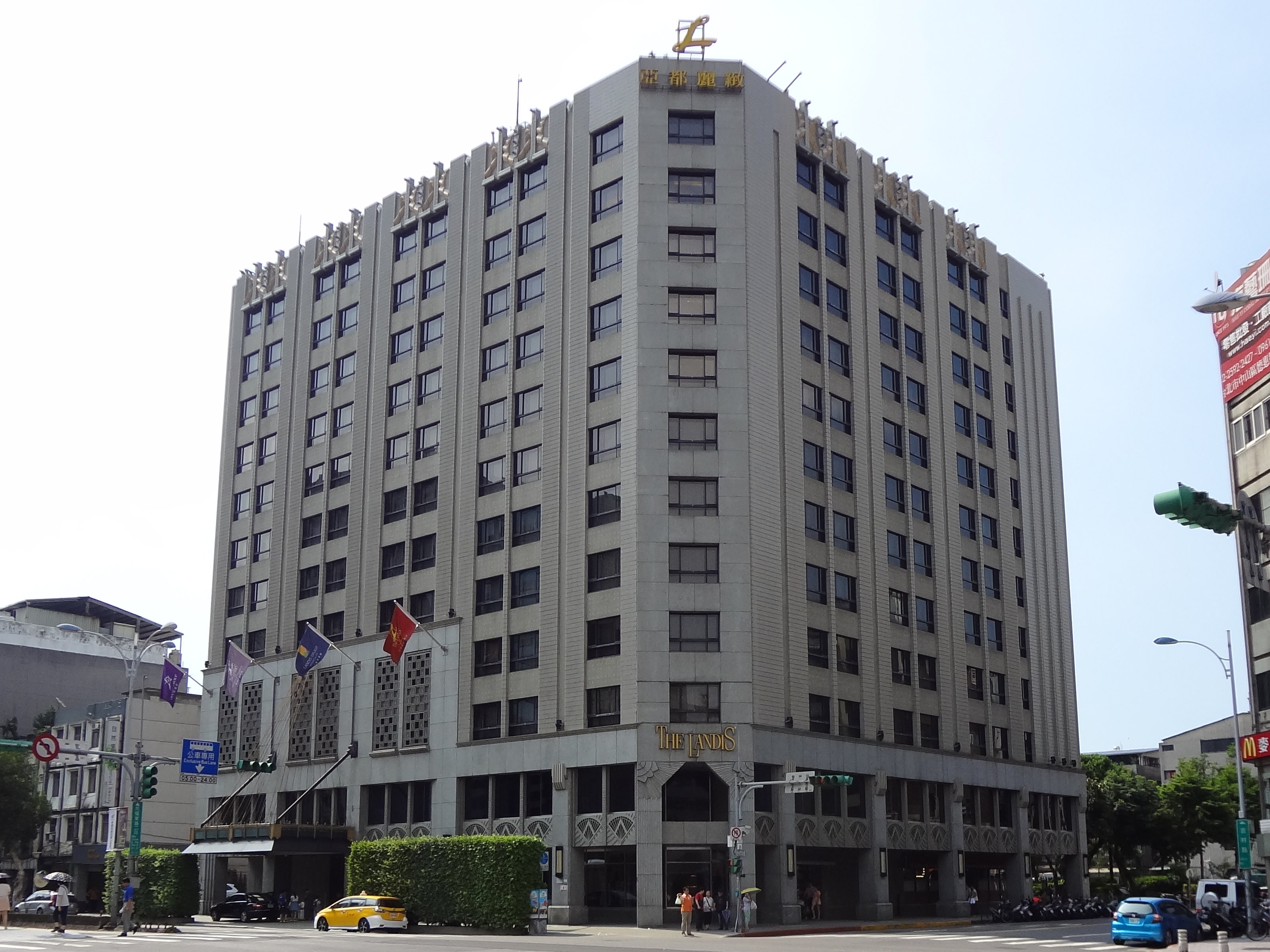

- Location within Taiwan

General information
- Status: Completed
- Type: Hotel
- Location: No. 41, Section 2, Minquan East Road, Zhongshan District, Taipei, Taiwan
- Coordinates: 25.0630°N 121.5299°E
- Completed: 1979
- Opening: 1979

Other information
- Number of rooms: 209

Website
- The Landis Taipei Hotel

The Landis Taipei (Chinese: 亞都麗緻大飯店) is a five-star luxury hotel located in Zhongshan District, Taipei, Taiwan. Opened in 1979, the hotel has 209 rooms and suites and has facilities such as a 24-hour business center, rooftop fitness center, and Proust VIP lounge. The Landis Taipei has received many distinguished guests in the past, including The Three Tenors.

== Restaurants ==
- Tien Hsiang Lo: A Zhejiang restaurant located on floor B1 serving Hangzhou’s traditional dishes, such as drunken chicken.
- La Brasserie and Le Rendez-Vous: A French restaurant serving provincial specialties and cocktails.
- Paris1930 de Hideki Takayama: French restaurant.
- Liz Gastronomie: A pastry shop offering a variety of breads, cakes, pastries and desserts.

== Public transportation ==
=== Taipei Metro ===
- Zhonghe–Xinlu line
  - Zhongshan Elementary School metro station

== Gallery ==
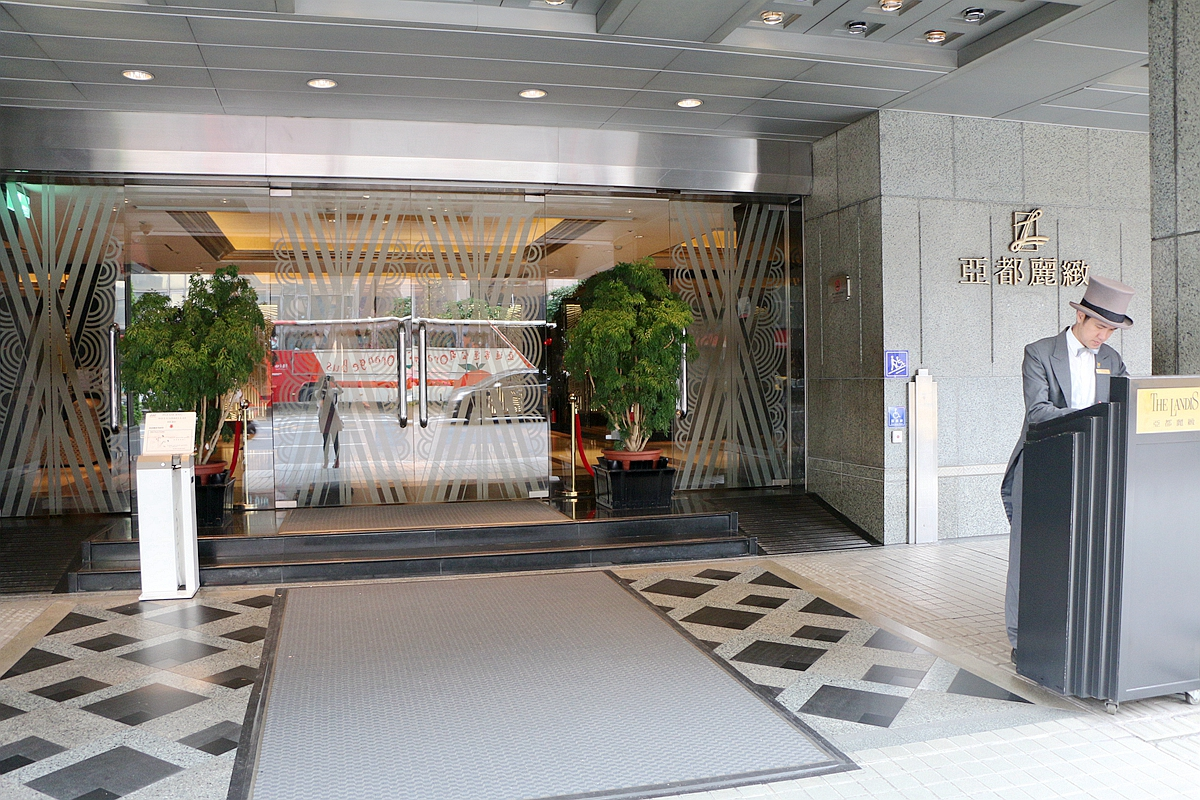
Entrance

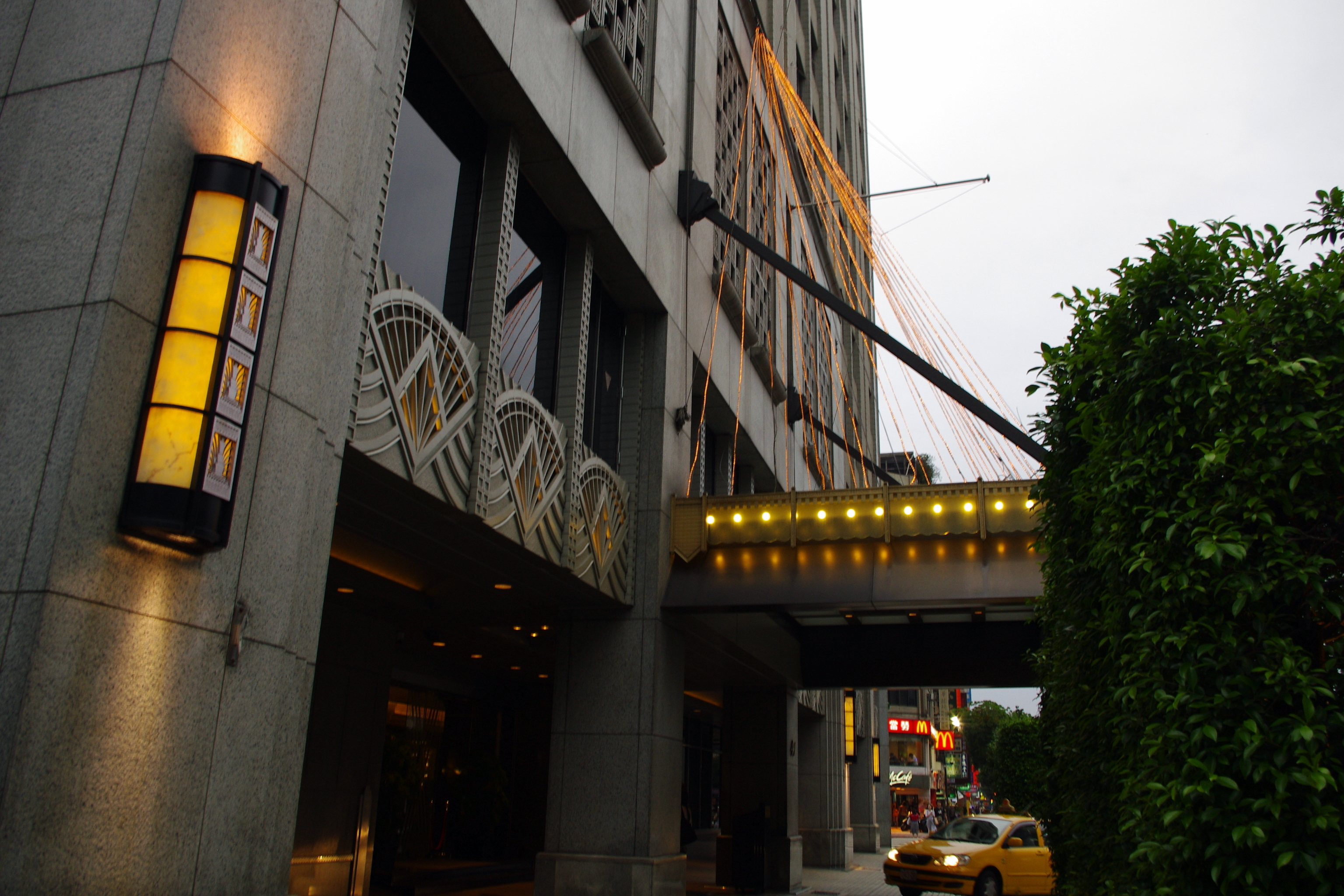

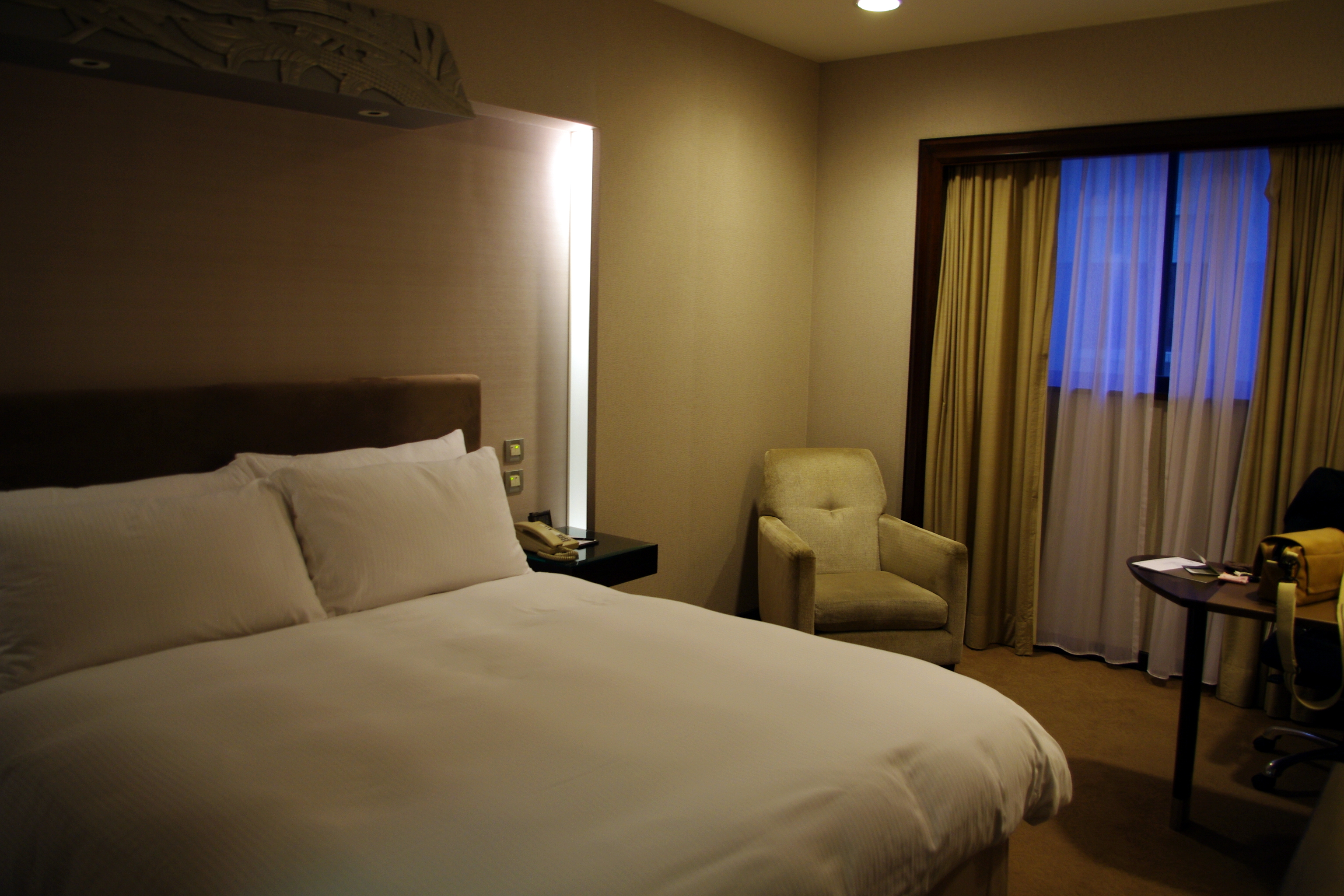
Bedroom

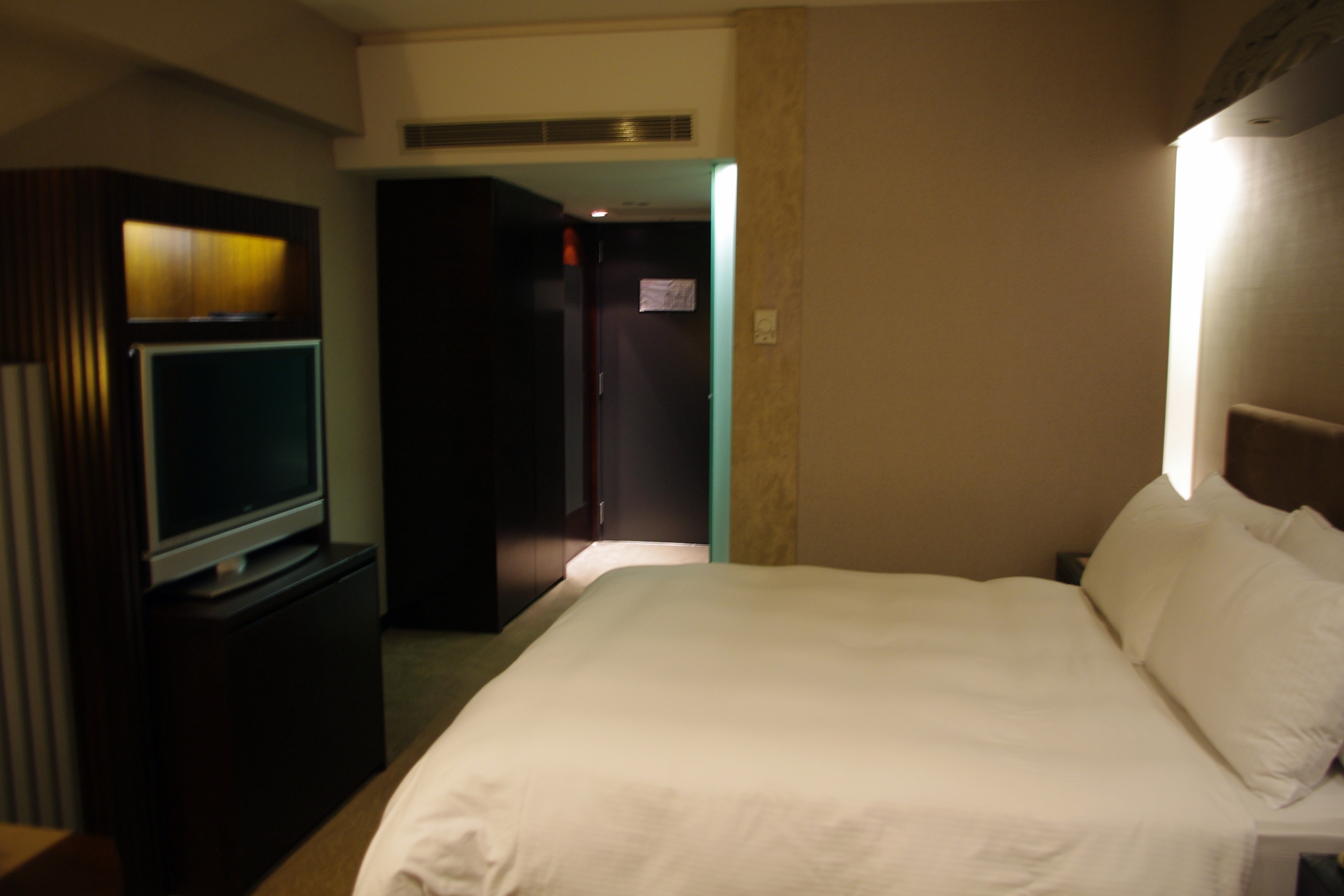

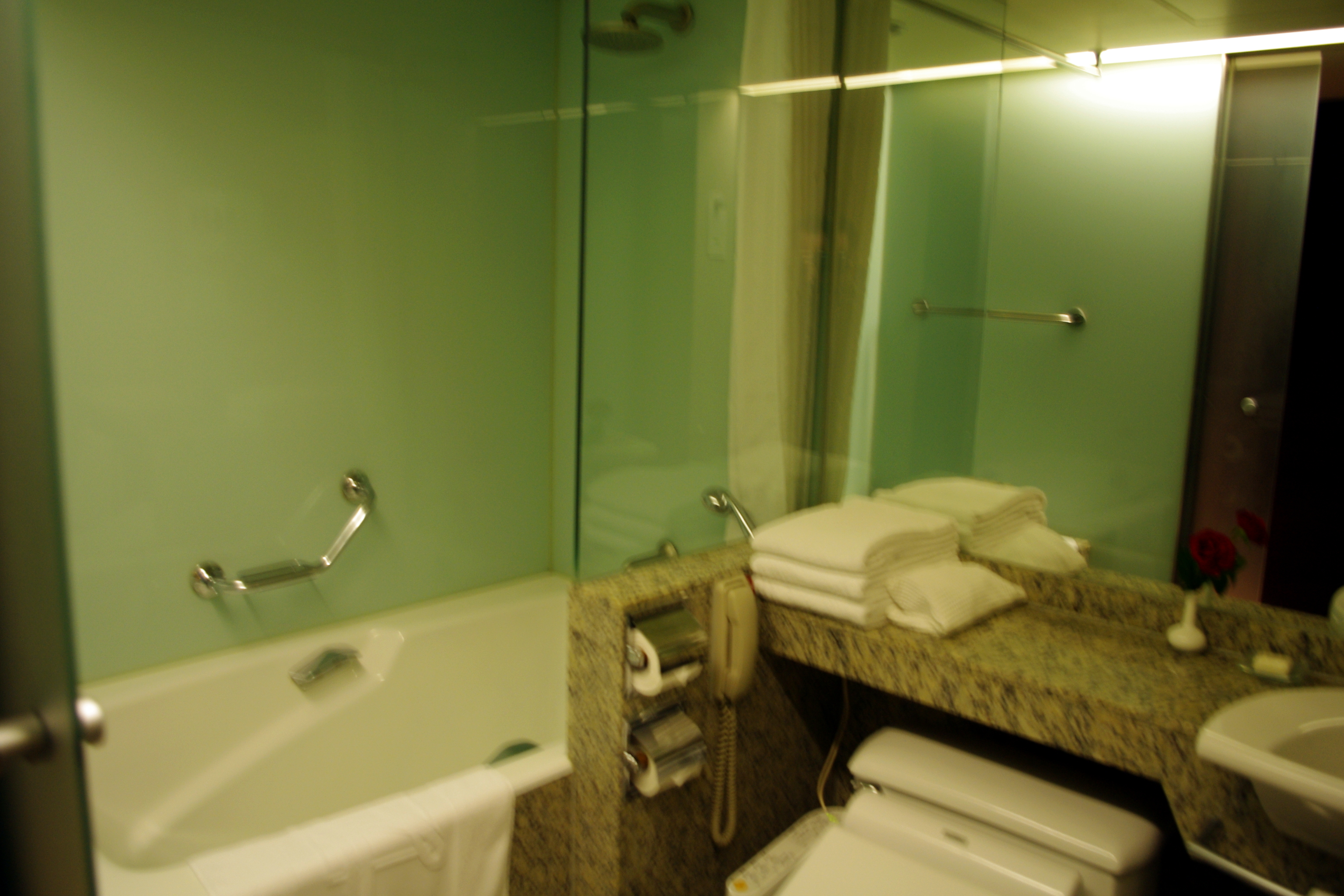
Bathroom

== See also ==
- Shangri-La Far Eastern, Taipei
- Mandarin Oriental, Taipei
- Hotel Metropolitan Premier Taipei
