= Lin An Tai Historical House and Museum =

Museum in Zhongshan, Taipei, Taiwan

- 林安泰古厝
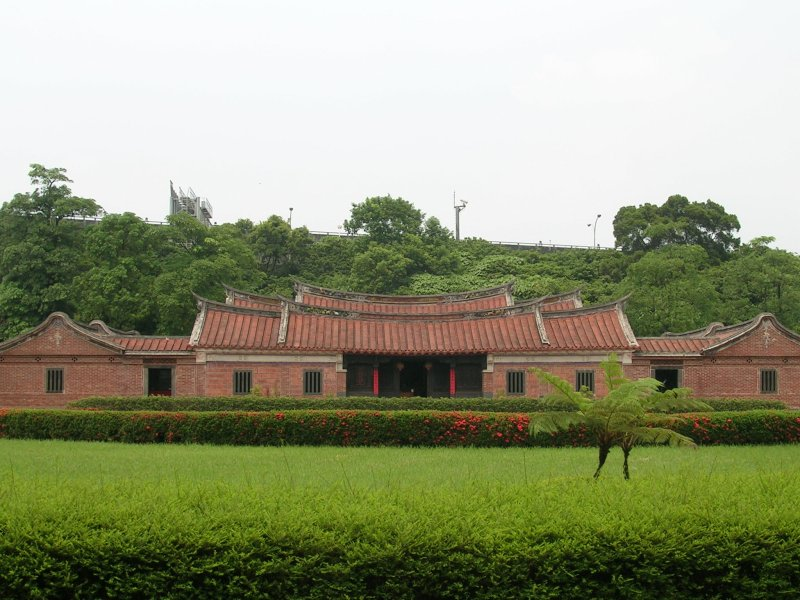
- Established: May 2000
- Location: Zhongshan, Taipei, Taiwan
- Coordinates: 25°04′18.3″N 121°31′49.3″E
- Type: museum
- Website: Official website

The Lin An Tai Historical House and Museum (Chinese: 林安泰古厝; pinyin: Línāntài Gǔcuò) is a museum in Zhongshan District, Taipei, Taiwan.

== History ==
The building was originally built by the Lin Family who migrated to Taiwan in the 18th century. By 1978, the building, originally located at No. 141, Siwei Road, Da'an District, Taipei City, had fallen into a state of disrepair. It had failed to be registered as a historical site, putting it at risk of demolition for the Dunhua South Road expansion project.

However, after petitions from many scholars and experts, Taipei City managed to relocate the building, and rebuilt it at its current situation. The building was opened to the public as a museum in May 2000. In 2010, its courtyard underwent extension.

== Architecture ==
The building follows the southern Fujian style courtyard. Rocks that cover the front yard of the house are the rocks taken from what was mainland merchants used to stabilize their ships. There is a pond in front of the house used for defense purpose and also for drinking and fire extinguisher.

== Transportation ==
The museum is accessible within walking distance east of Yuanshan Station of Taipei Metro.

== See also ==
- List of museums in Taiwan
