= Museum of Jade Art =

Museum in Zhongshan, Taipei, Taiwan

- 瑩瑋藝術翡翠文化博物館
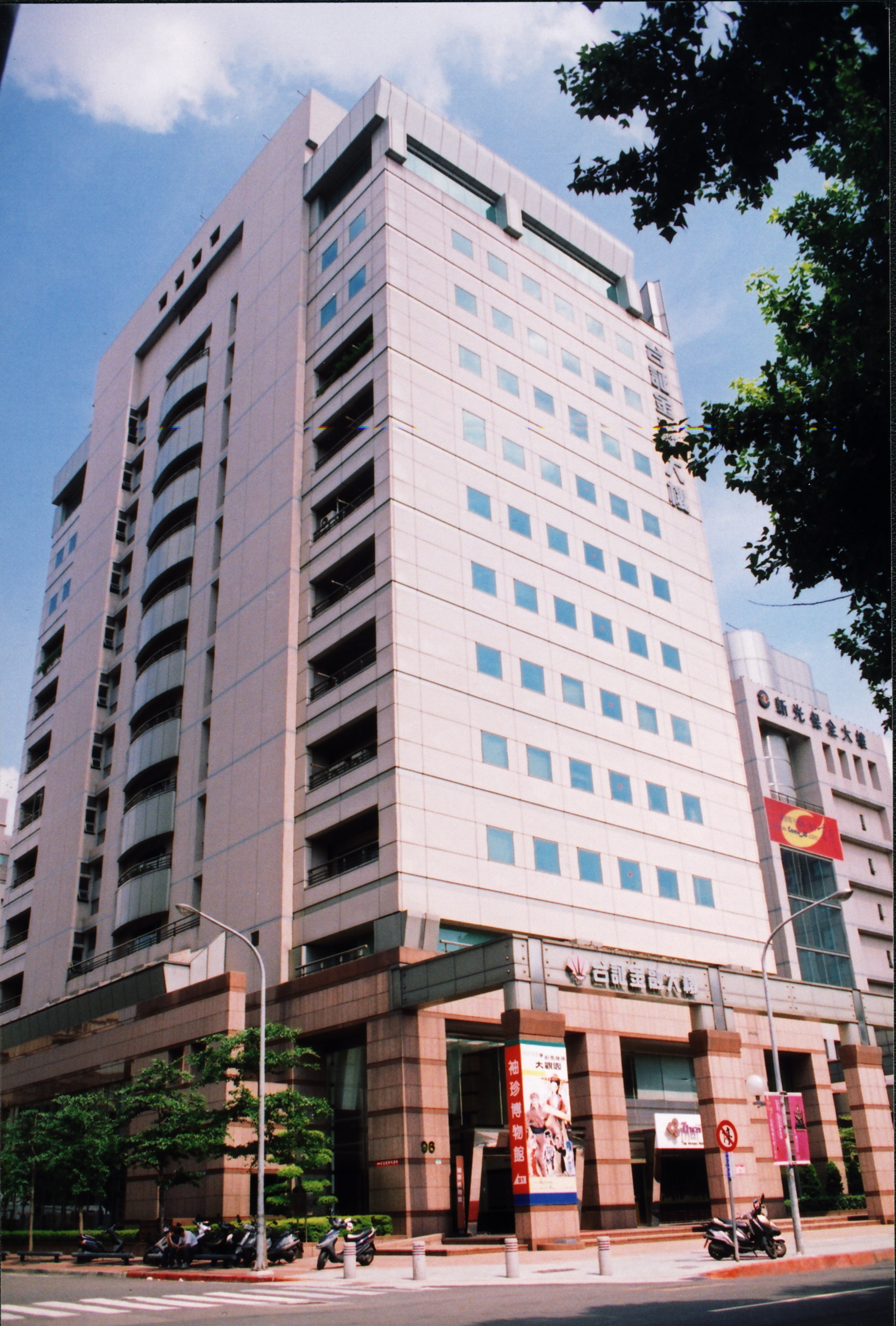

- Taiwan
- Established: 18 August 2008
- Dissolved: 2017
- Location: Zhongshan, Taipei, Taiwan
- Coordinates: 25°03′02″N 121°32′10″E
- Type: art museum
- Founder: Soofeen Hu

The Museum of Jade Art (MoJA; traditional Chinese: 瑩瑋藝術翡翠文化博物館; simplified Chinese: 莹玮艺术翡翠文化博物馆; pinyin: Yíngwěi Yìshù Fěicuì Wénhuà Bówùguǎn) was an art museum about jade art in Zhongshan District, Taipei, Taiwan. It claimed to be the first museum in the world dedicated to jade art.

== History ==
The museum's founder, Soofeen Hu, visited the National Palace Museum in Taipei during his childhood. He was captivated by a jade sculpture there in the shape of a cabbage, and his continued interest in jade culminated in the creation of the Museum.

== Exhibits ==
Exhibits at the museum included 13 jade tablets that have Chinese calligraphy carved into them.

== See also ==
- List of museums in Taiwan
