= Chiang Wei-shui Memorial Park =

Memorial park in Datong, Taipei, Taiwan

- 蔣渭水紀念公園
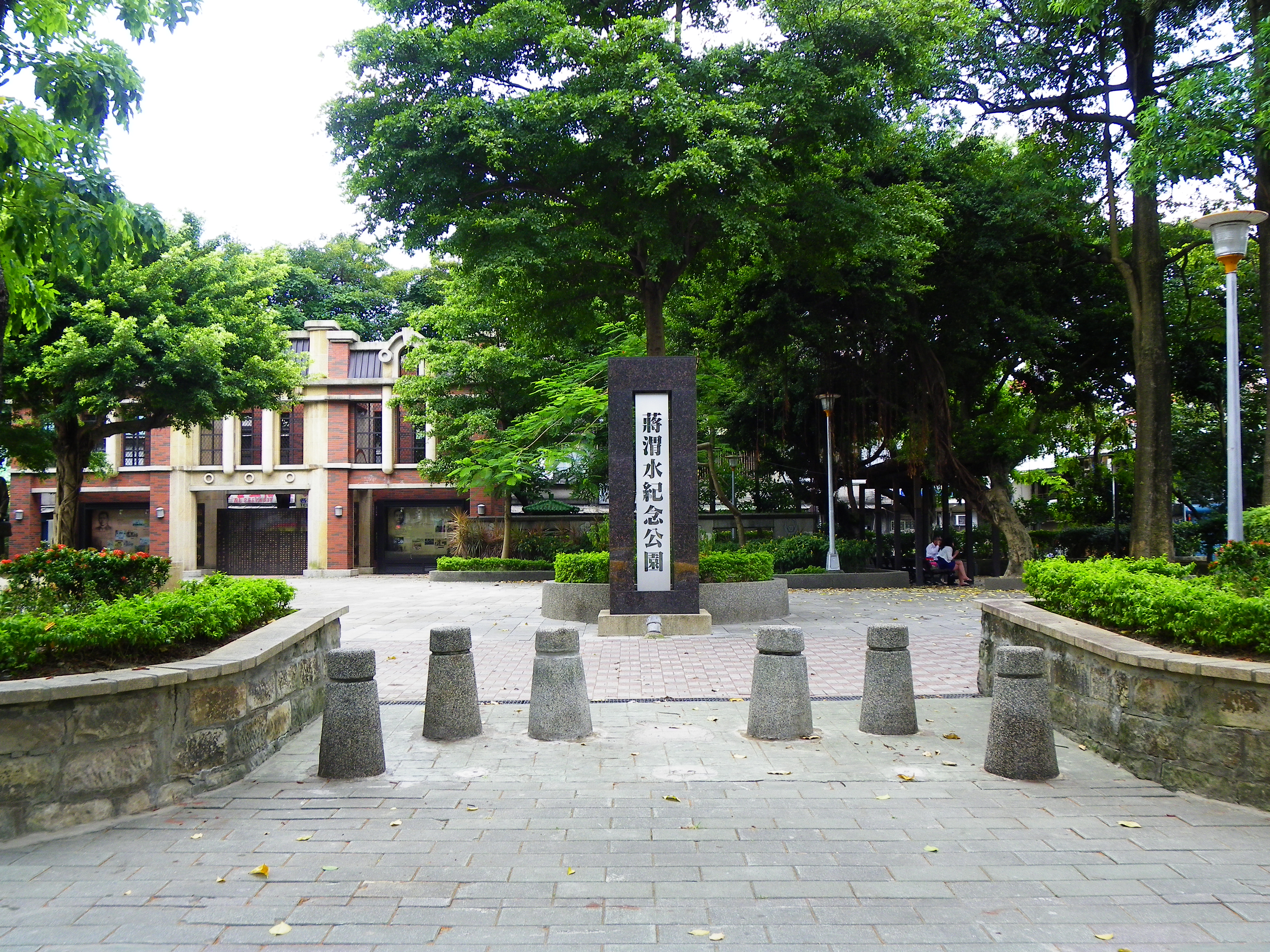
- Interactive map of Chiang Wei-shui Memorial Park
- Type: memorial park
- Location: Datong, Taipei, Taiwan
- Coordinates: 25°3′35.2″N 121°31′0.6″E
- Area: 5,060 m^{2} (54,500 sq ft)
- Established: 5 August 2006

The Chiang Wei-shui Memorial Park (traditional Chinese: 蔣渭水紀念公園; simplified Chinese: 蒋渭水纪念公园; pinyin: Jiǎng Wèishuǐ Jìniàn Gōngyuánn) is a memorial park in Datong District, Taipei, Taiwan. The park commemorates Chiang Wei-shui.

== History ==
The park was originally named as Jinxi Park. It was then renamed and rededicated by the Taipei City Government to commemorate Chiang's efforts in promoting democracy and development of Taiwan on 5 August 2006 in conjunction with the 75th anniversary of Chiang's death in a ceremony attended by Vice President Annette Lu, Premier Su Tseng-chang and Taipei Mayor Ma Ying-jeou.

== Architecture ==
The park spans over an area of 5,060 m^{2}. It features a baroque arched facade and a stale near the entrance.

== Transportation ==
The memorial park is accessible within walking distance south west of Minquan West Road Station of Taipei Metro.

== See also ==
- List of tourist attractions in Taiwan
