= Zhongshan Elementary School metro station =

Metro station in Taipei, Taiwan

Zhongshan Elementary School 中山國小
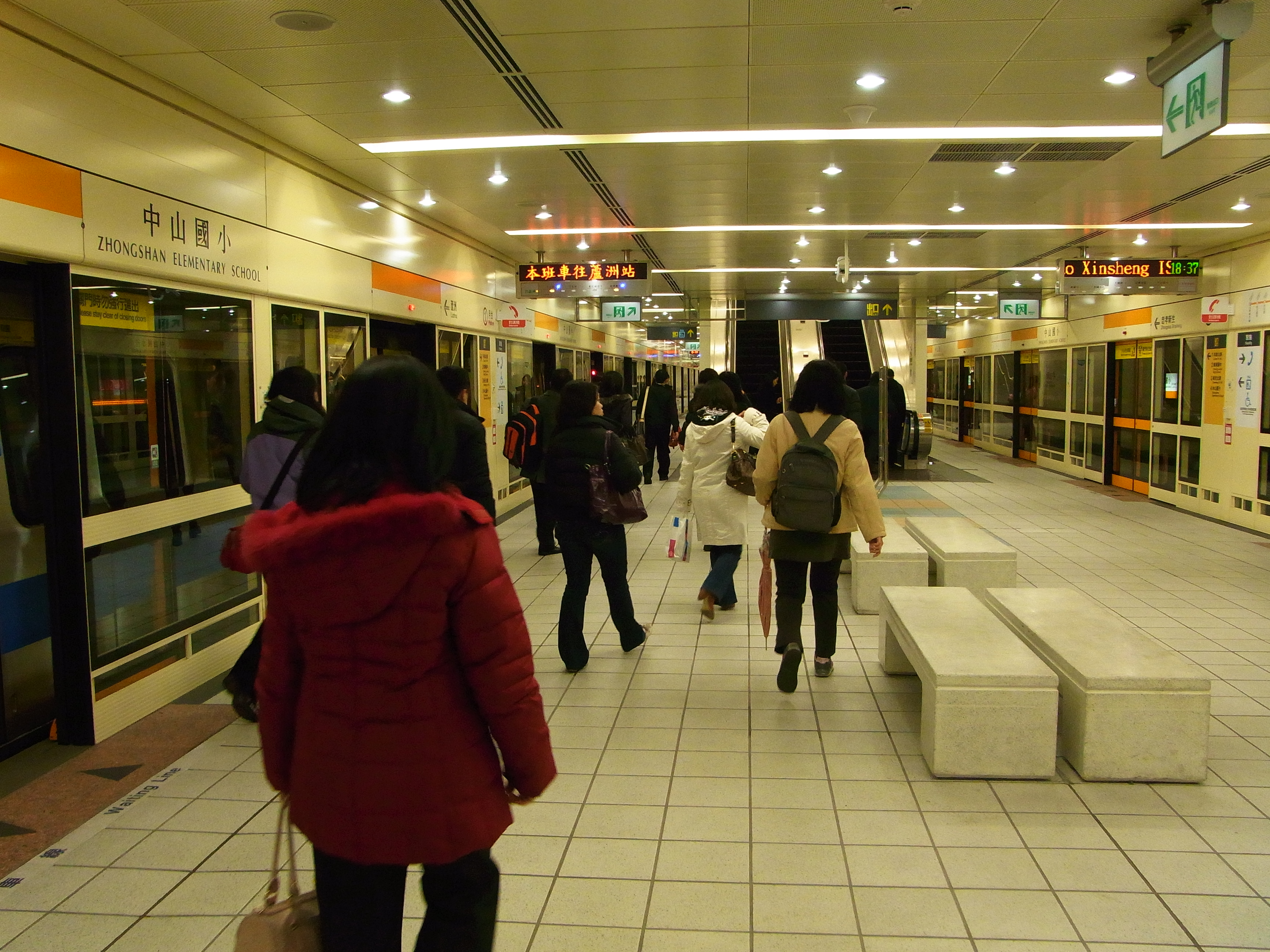
- Zhongshan Elementary School station platform

Chinese name
- Traditional Chinese: 中山國小
- Simplified Chinese: 中山国小
Transcriptions
Standard Mandarin
- Hanyu Pinyin: Zhōngshān Guóxiǎo
- Bopomofo: ㄓㄨㄥ ㄕㄢ ㄍㄨㄛˊ ㄒㄧㄠˇ
- Wade–Giles: Chung¹-shan¹ Kuo²-hsiao³
Hakka
- Pha̍k-fa-sṳ: Chûng-sân Koet-séu
Southern Min
- Tâi-lô: Tiong-san Kok-sió

General information
- Other names: Qingguang Commercial Zone; 晴光商圈
- Location: B1, No. 71, Sec. 1, Minquan E. Rd. Zhongshan, Taipei; Taiwan
- Coordinates: 25.062689°N 121.526572°E
- Operator: Taipei Metro
- Line: Zhonghe–Xinlu line
- Connections: Bus stop

Construction
- Structure type: Underground
- Platform levels: 3

Other information
- Station code: O10

History
- Opened: 3 November 2010; 15 years ago

Passengers
- 35,966 daily (December 2024)
- Rank: 48 out of 109

Services
| Preceding station | Taipei Metro | Following station |
|---|---|---|
| Xingtian Temple towards Nanshijiao | Zhonghe–Xinlu line | Minquan West Road towards Huilong or Luzhou |
Location

The Taipei Metro Zhongshan Elementary School station is a station on the Zhonghe–Xinlu line located in Zhongshan, Taipei, Taiwan. The station opened for service on 3 November 2010.

This station was named after the Zhongshan Elementary School, but it is notable that the Taiwan Institute of Economic Research is located nearby.

== Station overview ==
This two-level, underground station has an island platform. It is located beneath the intersection of Minquan West Rd. and Linsen North Rd. and opened on 3 November 2010 with the opening of the Luzhou Branch Line and the Taipei City section of the Xinzhuang Line.

=== Construction ===
Excavation depth for this station is around 19 meters. It is 160 meters in length and 23 meters wide. It has four entrances, one accessible elevator, and two vent shafts. It is equipped with platform screen doors.

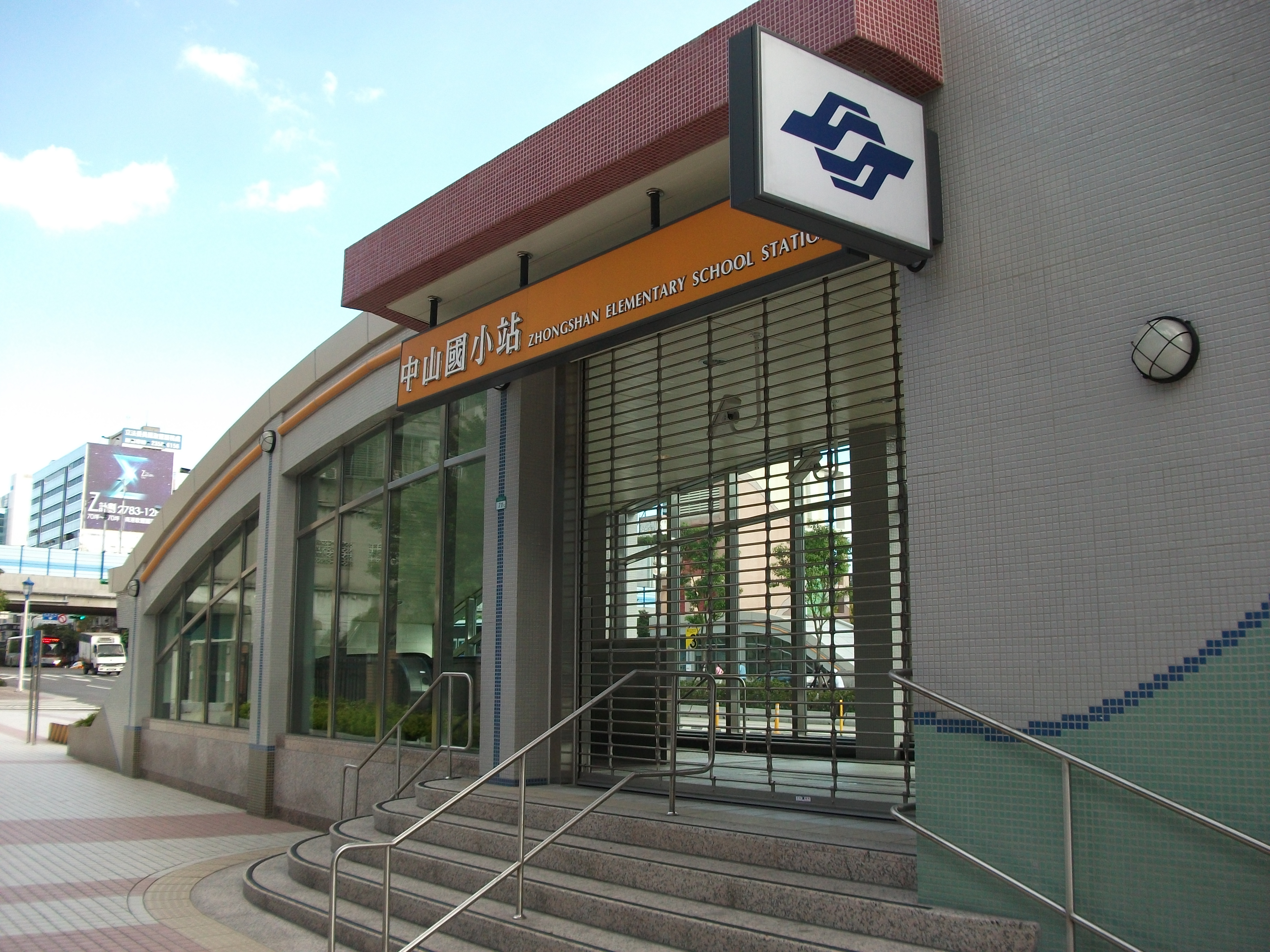
Zhongshan Elementary School station exit 4

== Station layout ==
| Street level | Entrance/exit | Entrance/exit |
| B1 | Concourse | Lobby, information desk, ticket machines, one-way faregates |
| B1 | Concourse | Restrooms |
| B2 | Platform 1 | ← Zhonghe–Xinlu line toward Luzhou / Huilong (O11 Minquan West Road) |
| B2 | Island platform, doors open on the left |
| B2 | Platform 2 | → Zhonghe–Xinlu line toward Nanshijiao (O09 Xingtian Temple) → |

=== Exits ===
- Exit 1: Linsen N. Rd.
- Exit 2: Xinxing Junior High School
- Exit 3: Xinsheng N. Rd.
- Exit 4: Zhongshan Elementary School

== Around the station ==
- Taiwan Institute of Economic Research
- The Landis Taipei
- Zhongshan Elementary School
- Xinxing Junior High School
- Taipei Public Library, Heng-an People's Reading Room
- Qingguang Shopping District
- Hotel Sunroute Taipei (between this station and Minquan West Road Station)
- Dao Jiang Senior High School of Nursing & Home Economics
- Shuangcheng Street Night Market
