= Linji Huguo Chan Temple =

Buddhist temple in Zhongshan District, Taipei, Taiwan

- 臨濟護國禪寺
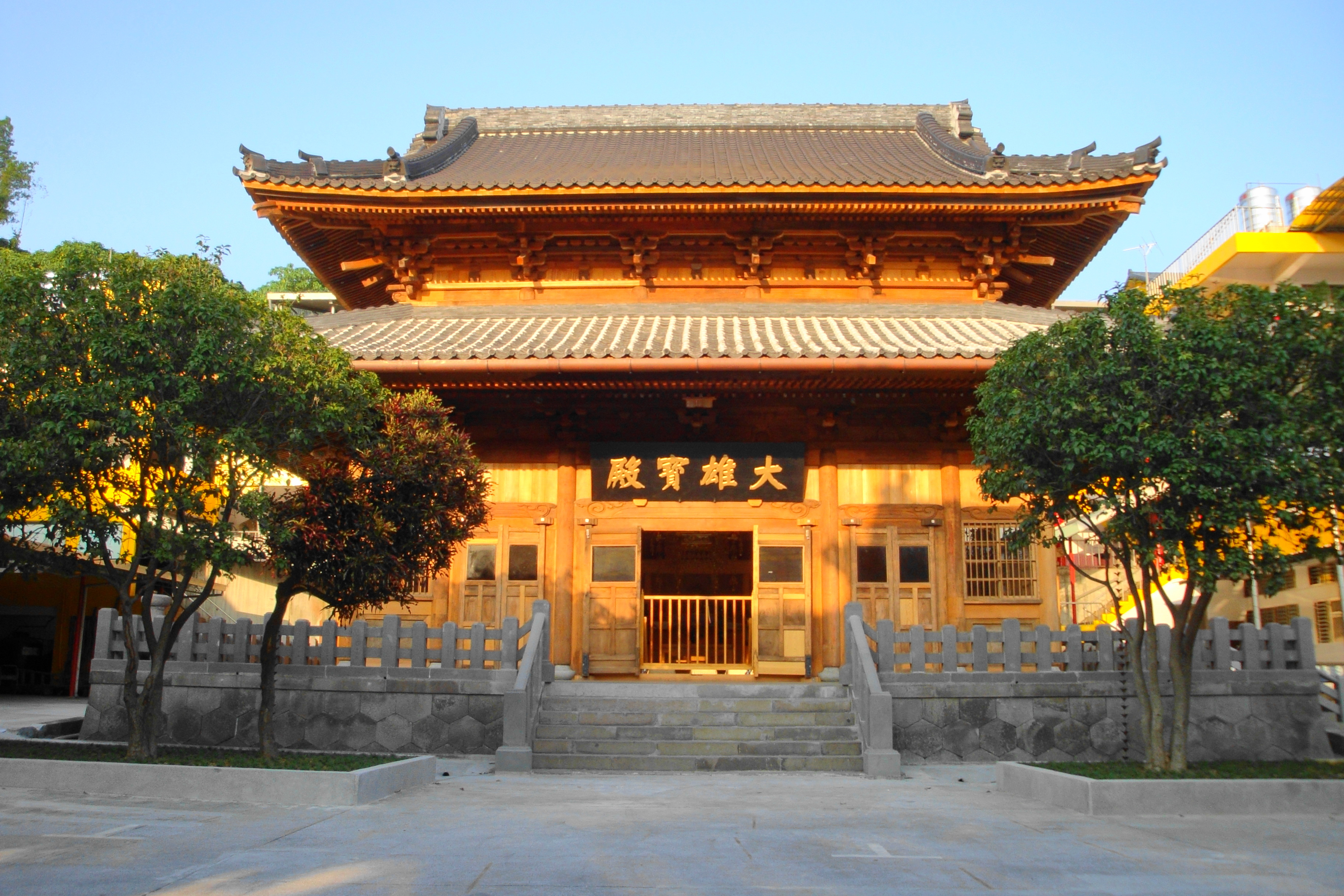

- Location within Taiwan

Religion
- Affiliation: Chan Buddhism
- Deity: Shakyamuni
- Rite: Linji school

Location
- Location: Zhongshan, Taipei, Taiwan
- Interactive map of Linji Huguo Chan Temple
- Coordinates: 25°04′20.88″N 121°31′14.93″E

Architecture
- Style: Chinese architecture
- Founder: Umeyama Genshu (梅山玄秀)
- Established: 1911

Linji Huguo Chan Temple (Chinese: 臨濟護國禪寺; pinyin: Línjí Hùguó Chán Sì) is a Buddhist temple located in Zhongshan District of Taipei, Taiwan.

== History ==
In 1900, then Japanese Governor of Taiwan Kodama Gentaro (兒玉源太郎), who himself was affiliated with the same sect, requested monks from the Rinzai school (of Zen Buddhism in Japan) to come to Taiwan, build a temple, and promote Zen Buddhism on the land nearby the (then) newly constructed Taiwan Grand Shrine (台灣神社). The first abbot who also oversaw the construction was Kodama Gentaro’s university classmate, Umeyama Genshu (梅山玄秀), at the time of the invitation, already a well known monk in Osaka. The temple was to be named later Rinzai Gokokuzen-ji (臨済護国禅寺), and it was a branch temple of Rinzai Zen Buddhism in Japanese rule period. Construction of the temple started in 1900 and was completed in 1911 (明治44年) with the original name Chin'nanzan Gokoku-ji Temple (鎮南山護國禪寺) which means that the temple was meant to help Protect the Southern Lands of the Japanese Empire. The statue of Sakyamuni was consecrated on June 21, 1912.

Large scale Japanese temples in Taipei include Shandao Temple, Donghe Chan Temple, Linji Hugou Chan Temple, etc., but only the main hall of the Linji Temple was preserved. In year 1984, in cooperation with the municipal government in order to expand the street, the main hall was moved to the North, and Yuenmen Street became the new point of entry and exit, and the alignment of the main hall was also changed from South-North to East-West (90 degree turn). With this move, the old temple gate and main hall axis was altered.

In April 2007, the Taipei Municipal Government has allocated NT$18.05 million for the reconstruction project.

== Visitor Information ==
=== Wheelchair Access ===
Currently from the buildings dedicated to religious service only the ground floor of the Lotus Treasury Hall (please check the Temple Buildings section) has easy wheelchair access (a concrete ramp).

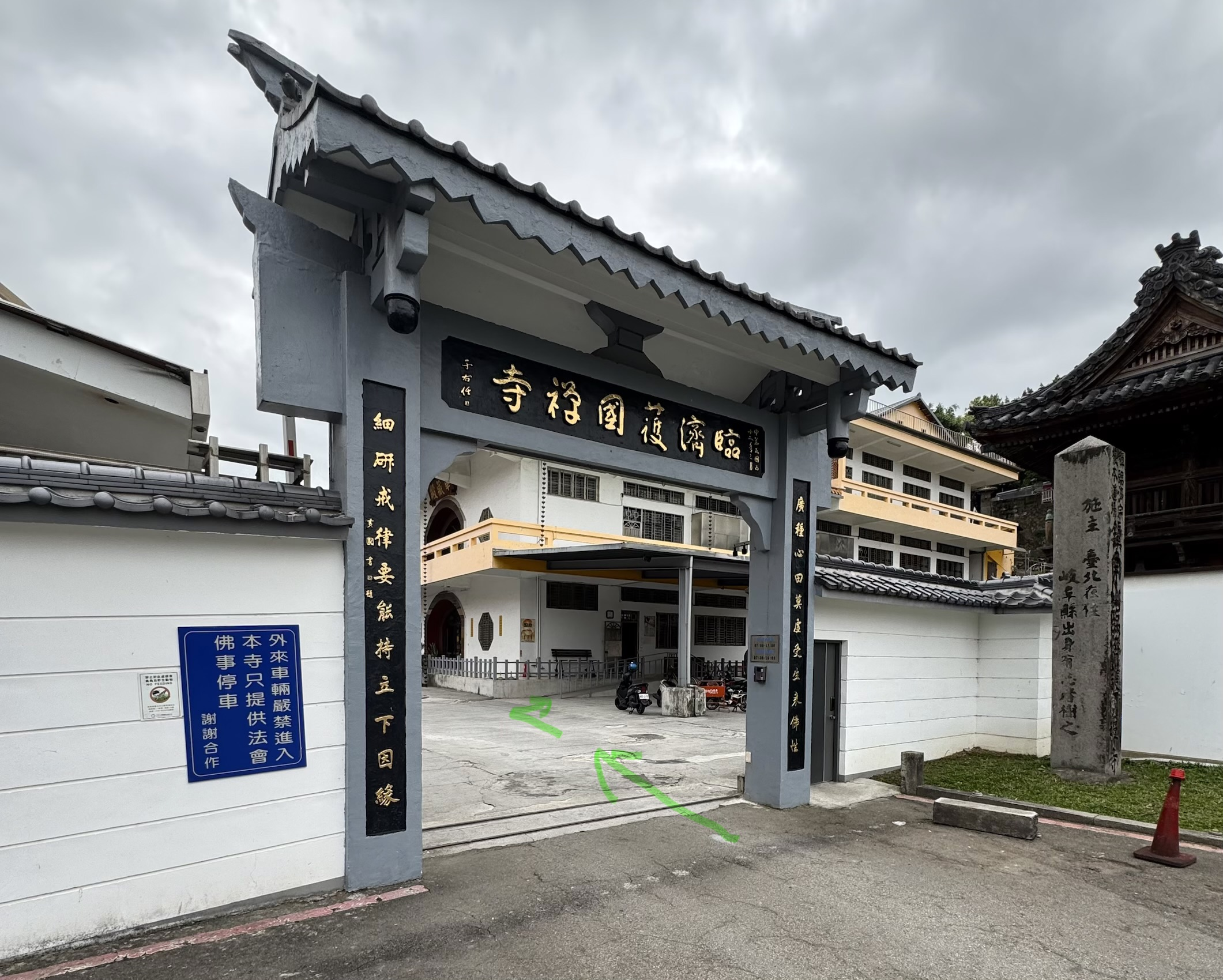
Wheelchair Access: SIDE GATE which is also used by all car traffic and GREEN LINES showing the way to the RAMP

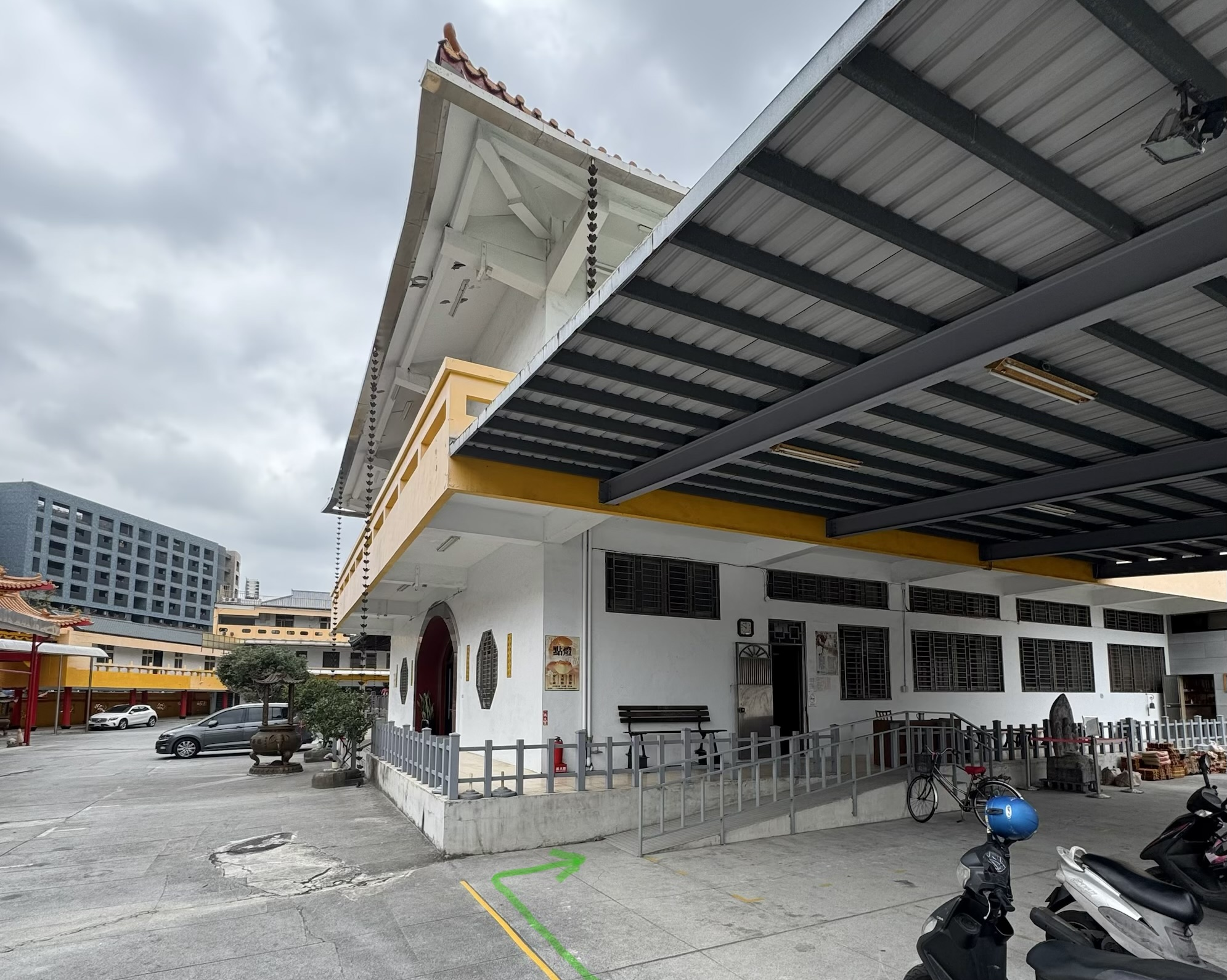
Wheelchair Access: View from the SIDE GATE; GREEN LINE pointing to the RAMP that leads to the inside of the Lotus Treasury Hall

There aren't any steps or a threshold at the side gate of the temple which is the closest gate to the Yuenshan MRT station. It is also the same gate which is used by most of the visitors including the car traffic. The "official" Main Gate is used by less than five percent of the total number of visitors and it cannot be used by a wheelchair as it has three flight of steps.

=== Sunday Meditation Program ===
On most Sunday mornings a more than an hour long meditation session is held starting at 8:30 am. Principally this program is only open to temple members and regular participants, however based on individual evaluation exceptions can be made on preliminary consultation and agreement by the monk in charge of this program. After the meditation session there is an hour dedicated for Dharma discussion while having tea, led by the monk in charge of the meditation class and a tea expert.

- Sunday Morning Walking Meditation in the Mahavira Hall (30 sec. video hosted on YouTube)
- Morning Tea and Dharma Discussion After the Sunday Meditation Class (5 sec. video hosted on YouTube)
- Coffee is Brewed During Teatime (10 sec. video hosted on YouTube)

== Temple Buildings & Architecture ==
The extant buildings include the Shanmen, Four Heavenly Kings Hall, Mahavira Hall, Lotus Treasury Hall, bell tower, drum tower and a pagoda.

=== Amitabha Hall ===
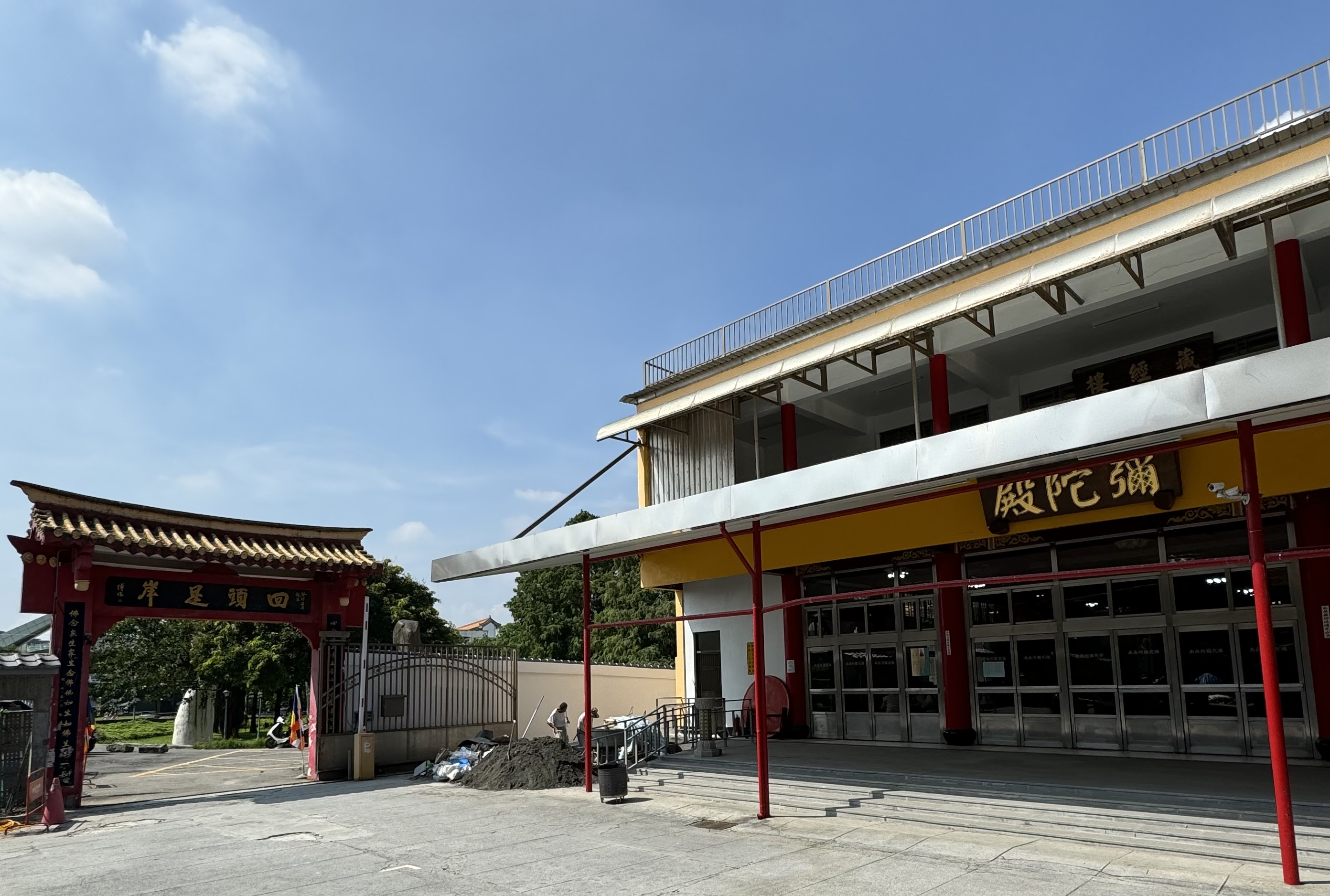
Temple Buildings & Architecture: Outside of the Amitabha Hall with the side entrance gate in 2024, August

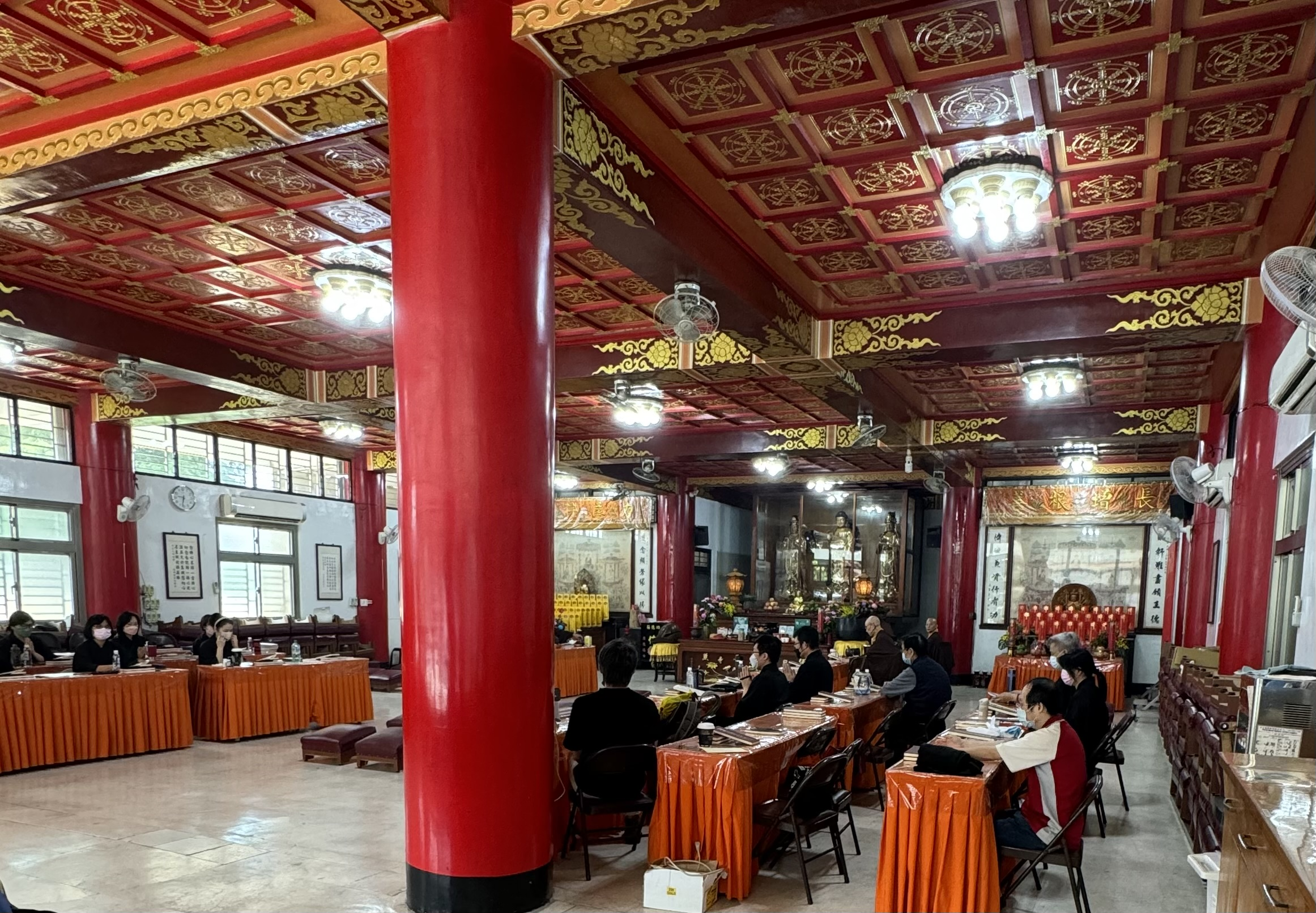
Temple Buildings & Architecture: Inside of the Amitabha Hall during a sutra chanting ceremony in 2024, August

=== Mahavira Hall ===
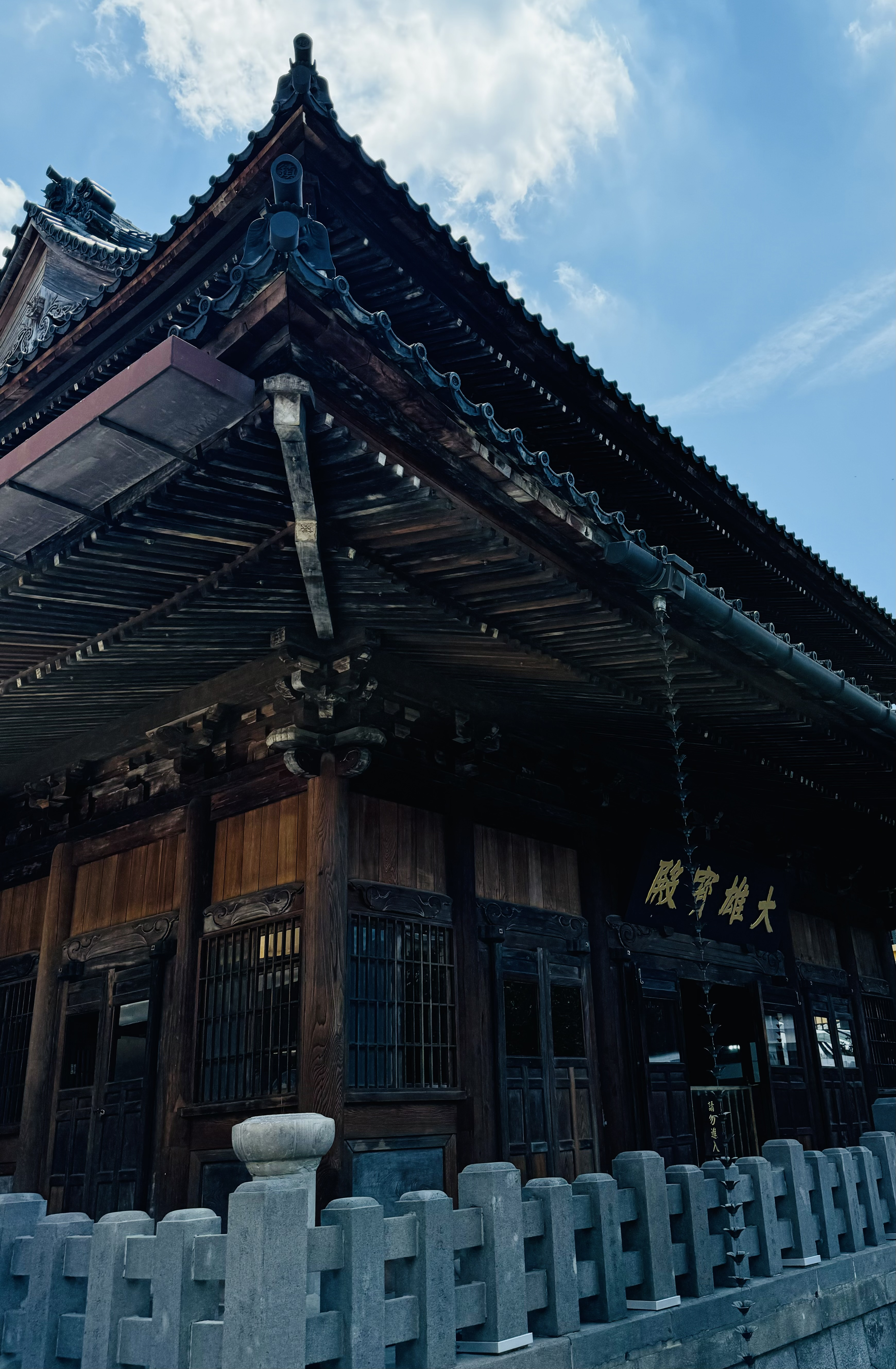
Temple Buildings & Architecture: The Mahavira Hall as seen from around one of its front corners in 2024

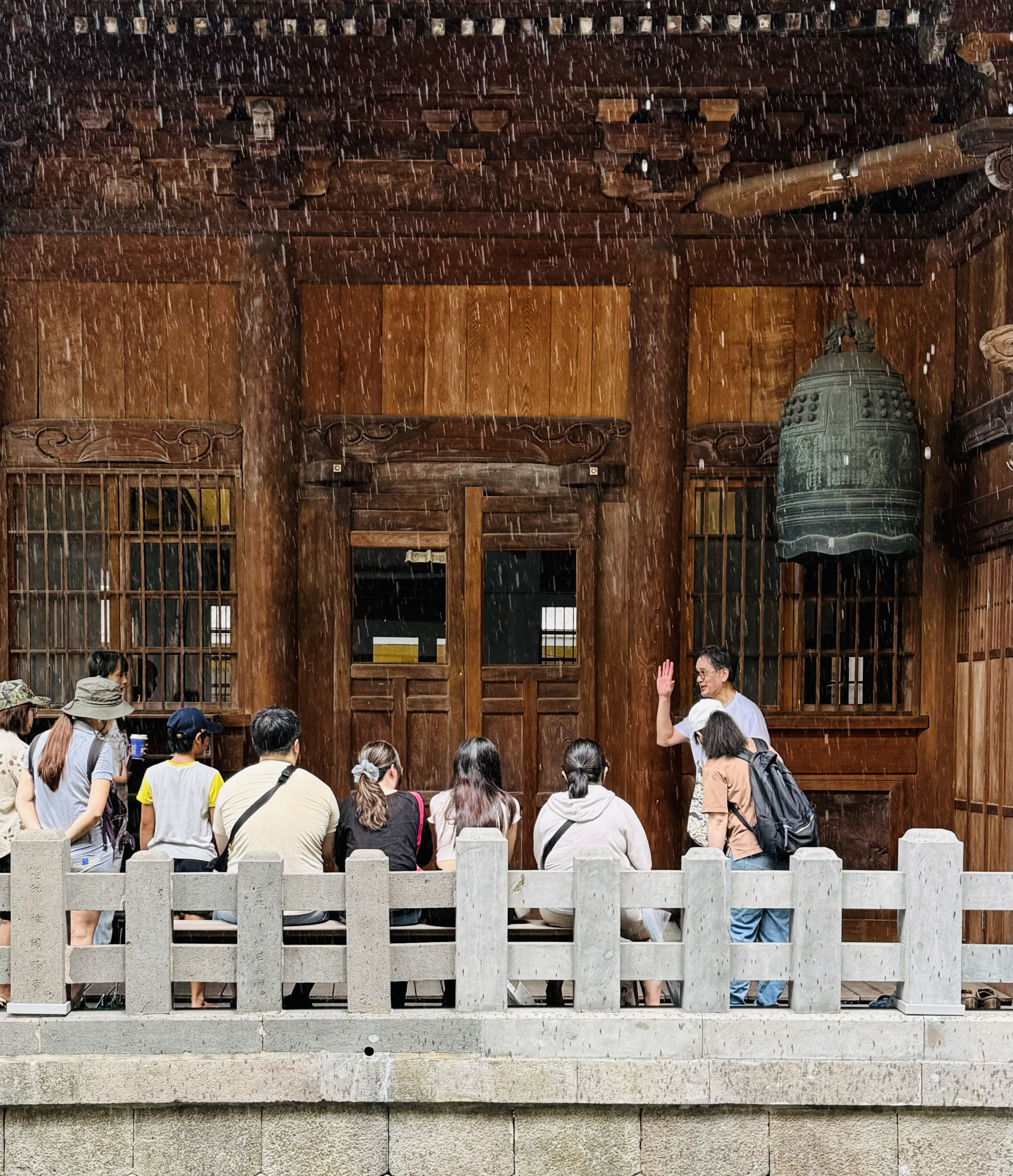
Temple Buildings & Architecture: A youth group listens to a guide’s explanation and observes the bell outside of the Mahavira Hall, on a hot and rainy day, early September of 2024

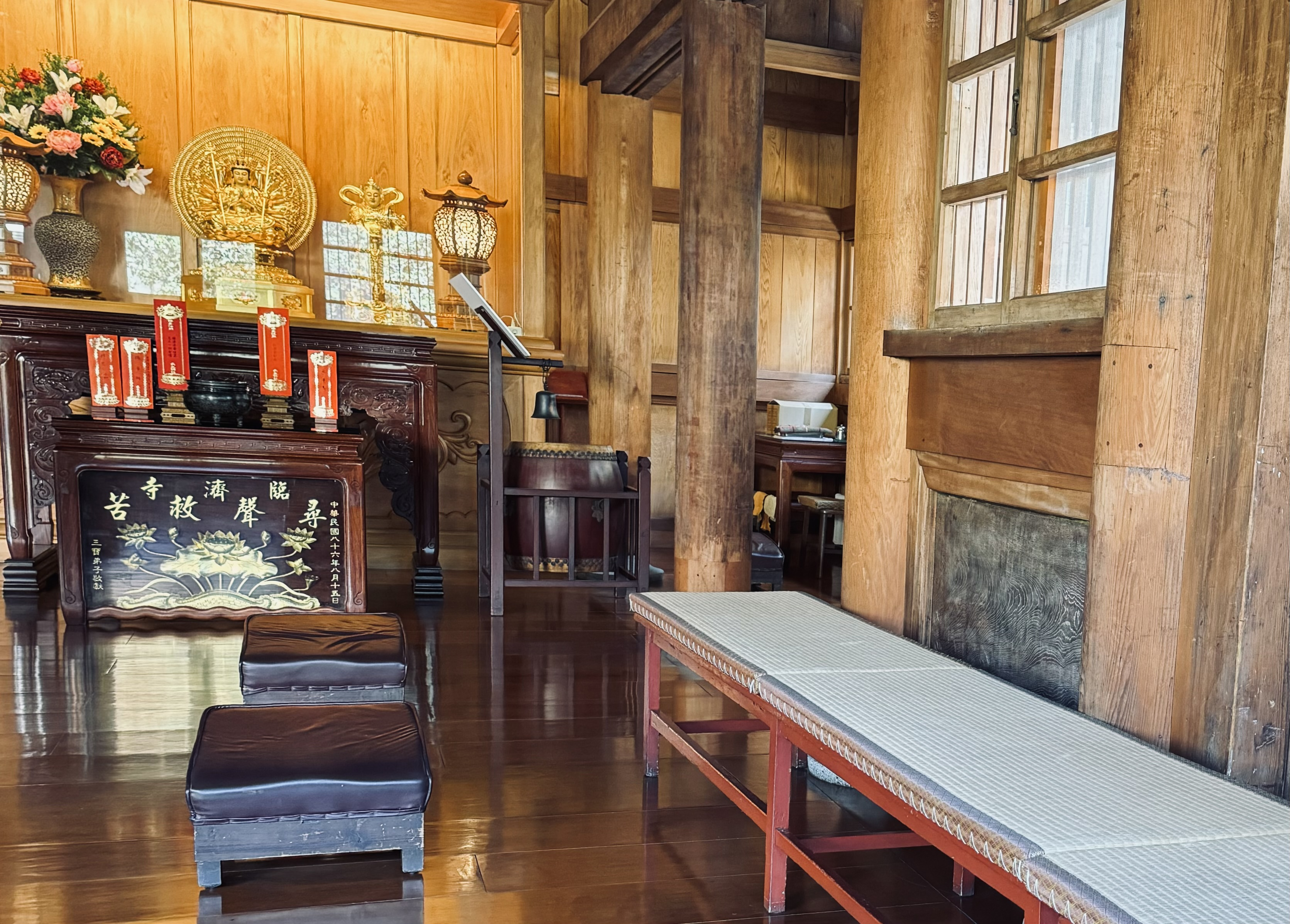
Temple Buildings & Architecture: Interior of the Mahavira Hall with tatami covered benches (used during Sunday meditation classes)

The Mahavira Hall was built with double-eaves gable and hip roofs. It modeled the architectural style of the Song dynasty. On each of the main ridge is a tile named "Onigawara". The Mahavira Hall houses statues of Sakyamuni (center), Guanyin (right) and Ksitigarbha (left).

=== Lotus Treasury Hall ===
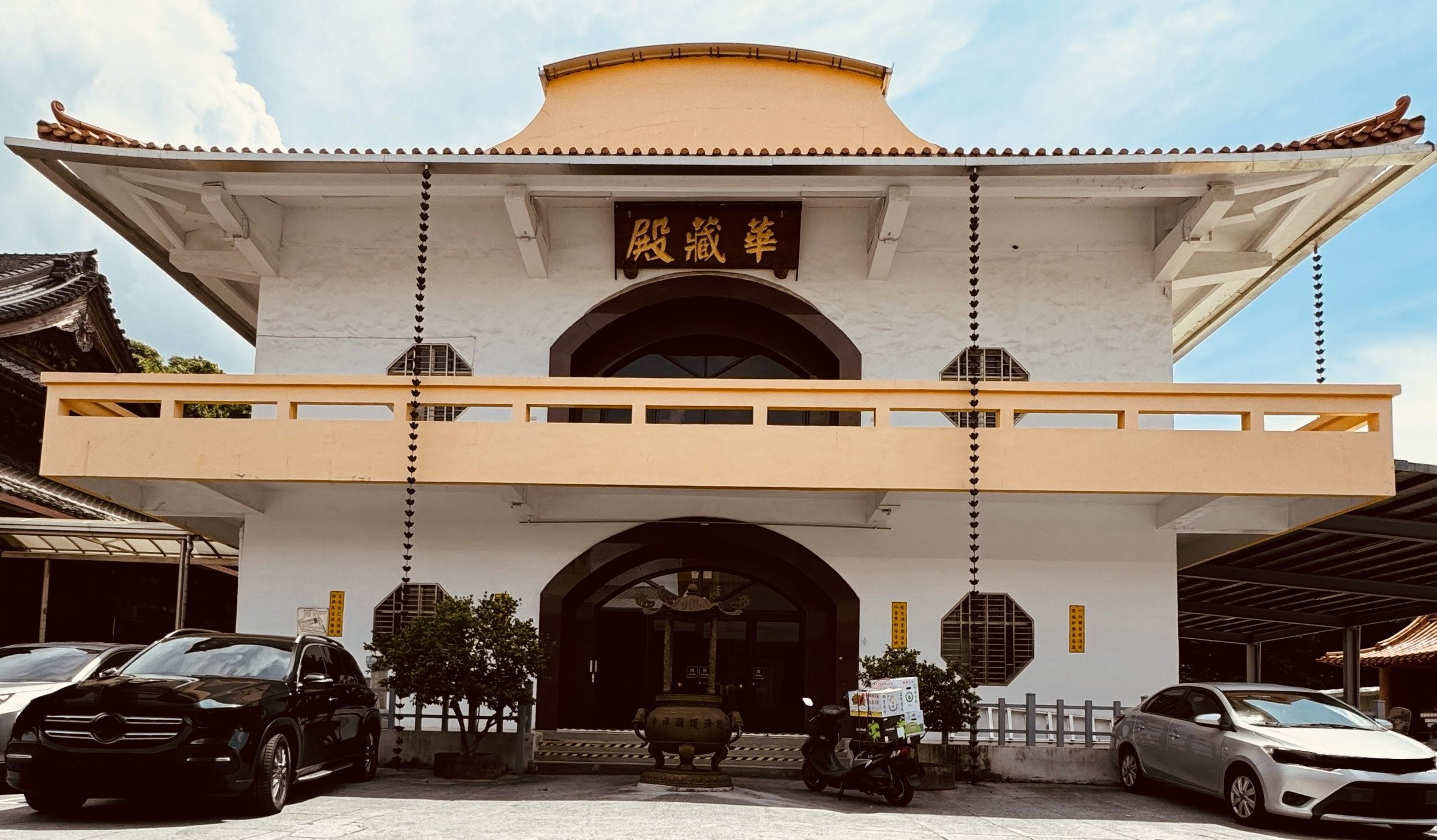
Temple Buildings & Architecture: The Lotus Treasury Hall in 2024, August

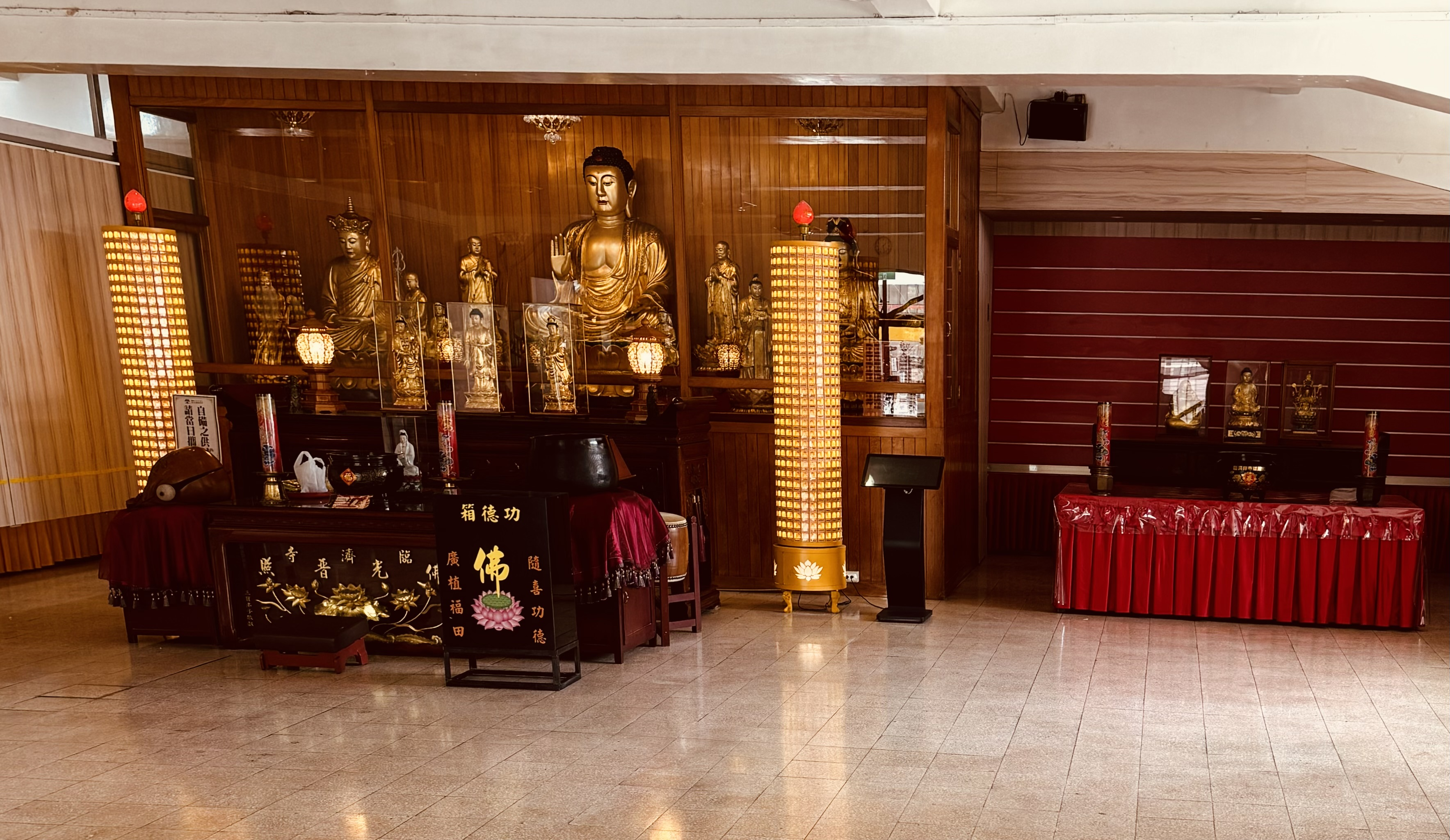
Temple Buildings & Architecture: Interior (ground floor) of The Lotus Treasury Hall in 2024, August

=== Dining Hall ===
The Dining Hall is located to the left side of the main gate and the Mahavira Hall and is able to accommodate 180 to 200 people.

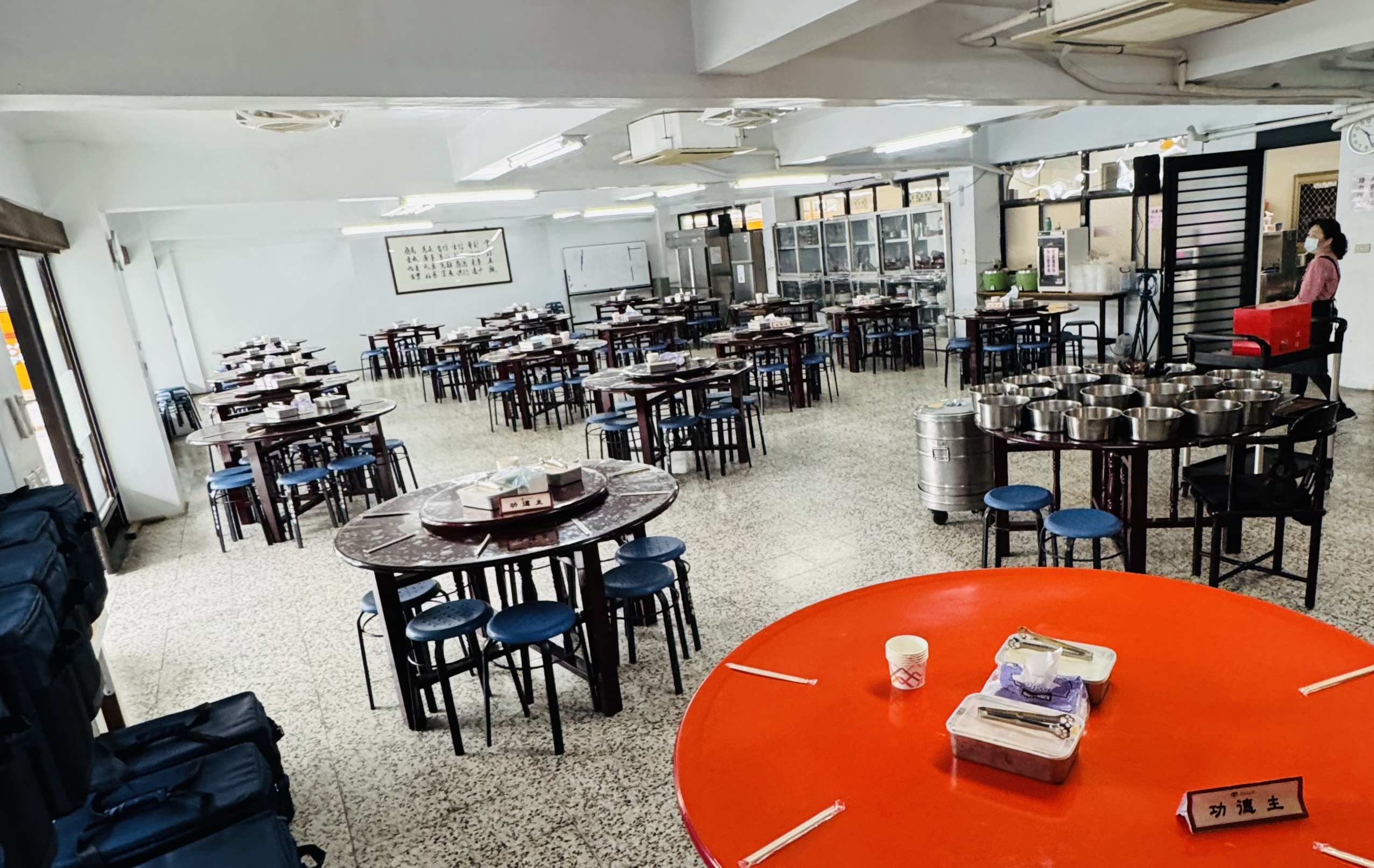
Temple Buildings & Architecture: Inside of the Dining Hall of Linji Huguo Chan Temple, in its full capacity it can accommodate 180-200 people

== Notable Items of Historical Significance ==
The Bodhisattva statues of Ārya-Avalokiteśvara (聖觀自在菩薩) and Kṣitigarbha on the back mountain side; the stone foundations of the octagonal building, and the tombstone of the temple founder are items of notable historical significance of the Japanese ruled time period of Taiwan and remaining parts of the old temple.

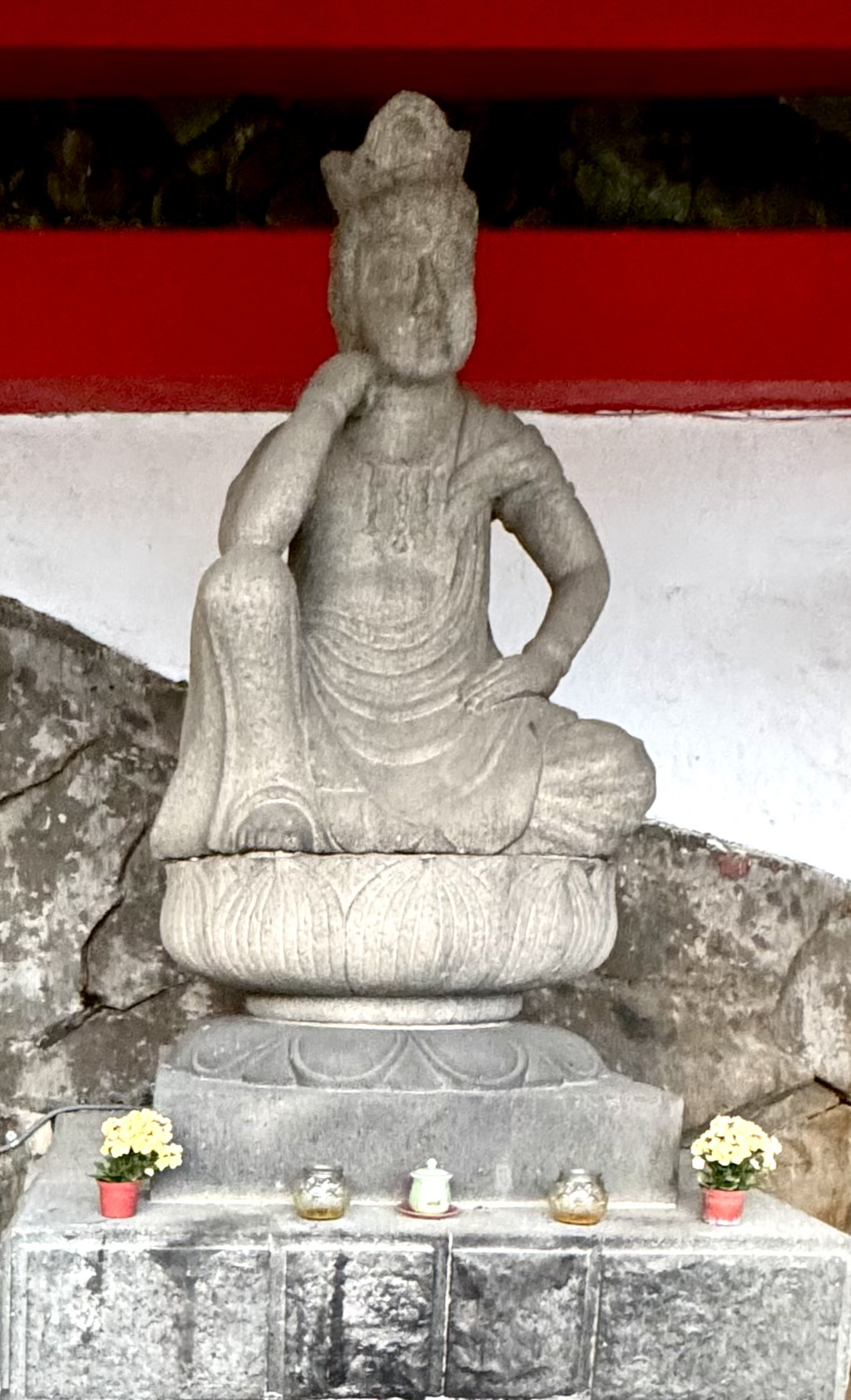
Notable Items of Historical Significance: Ārya-Avalokiteśvara (聖觀自在菩薩) Statue of Linji Huguo Chan Temple in Taipei

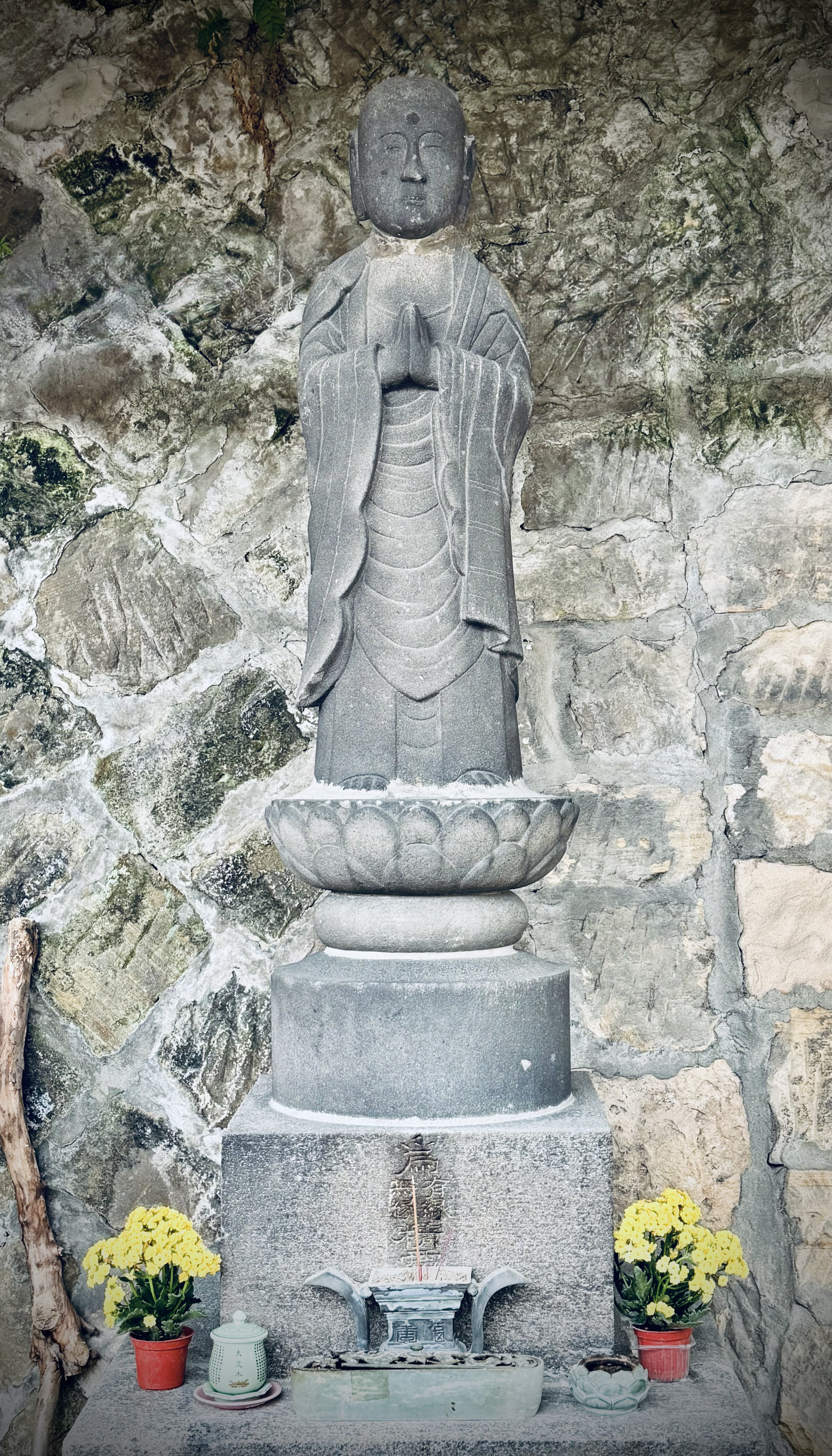
Notable Items of Historical Significance: Statue of Jizo (Kṣitigarbha) Bodhisattva at Linji Huguo Temple

There is a group of Buddha Triad statues located on the first floor of the Lotus Treasury Hall that are important artifacts of the Japanese Meiji era.

On the grounds of Linchi Huguo Temple there is a statue from the Eastern Wei Dynasty. This statue used to be part of an exhibition of "Northern Dynasties Buddhist Stone Carving Art" at the National Museum of History before it was moved to its current location. The back and the pedestal are engraved with scenes of the Buddha’s life.

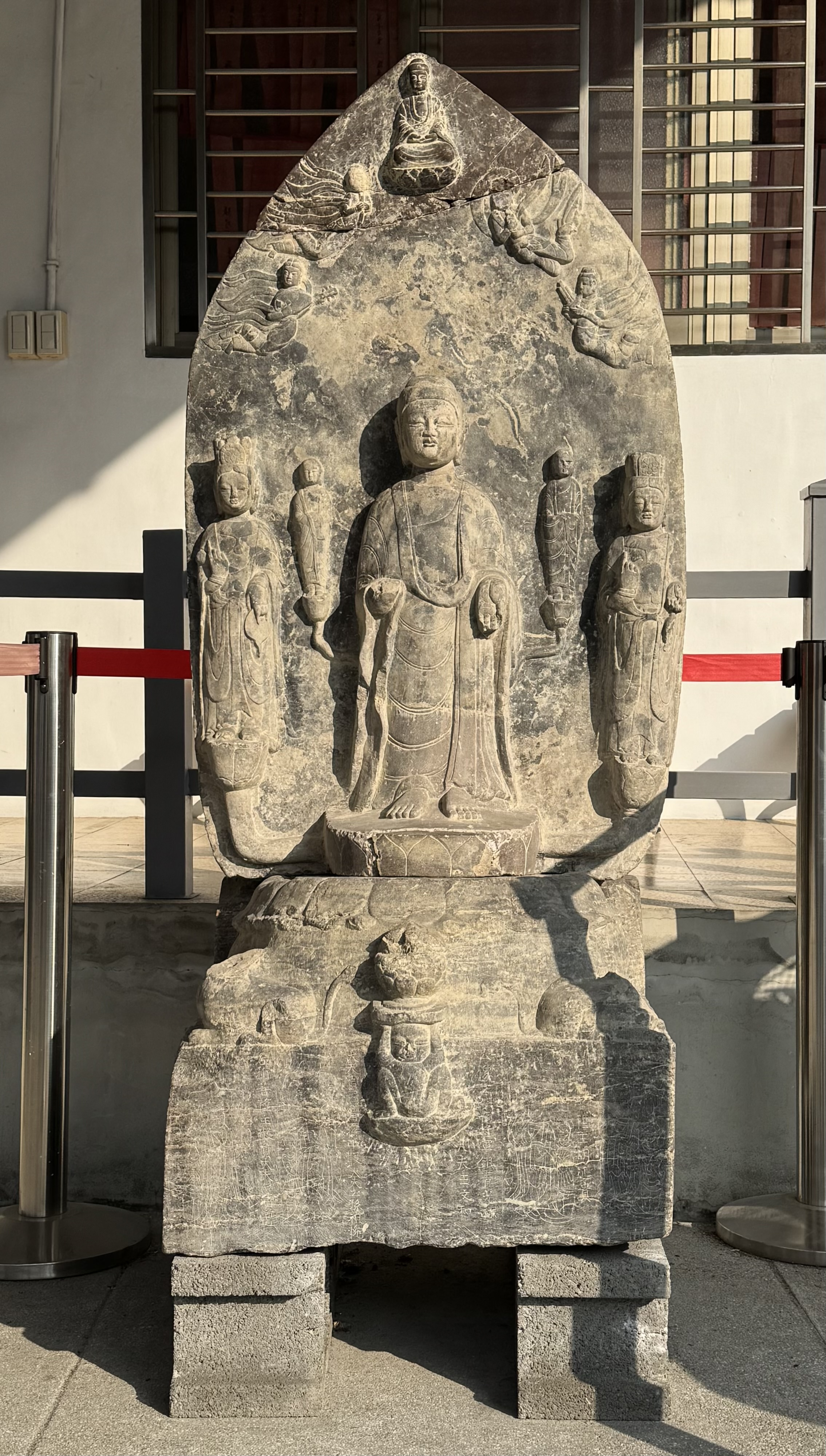
Notable Items of Historical Significance: Eastern Wei Dynasty Buddhist Sculpture: Lord Buddha with Two Disciples, Two Bodhisattvas and Four Flying Heavenly Beings
