= Shandao Temple =

Buddhist temple in Zhongzheng, Taipei, Taiwan

- 善導寺
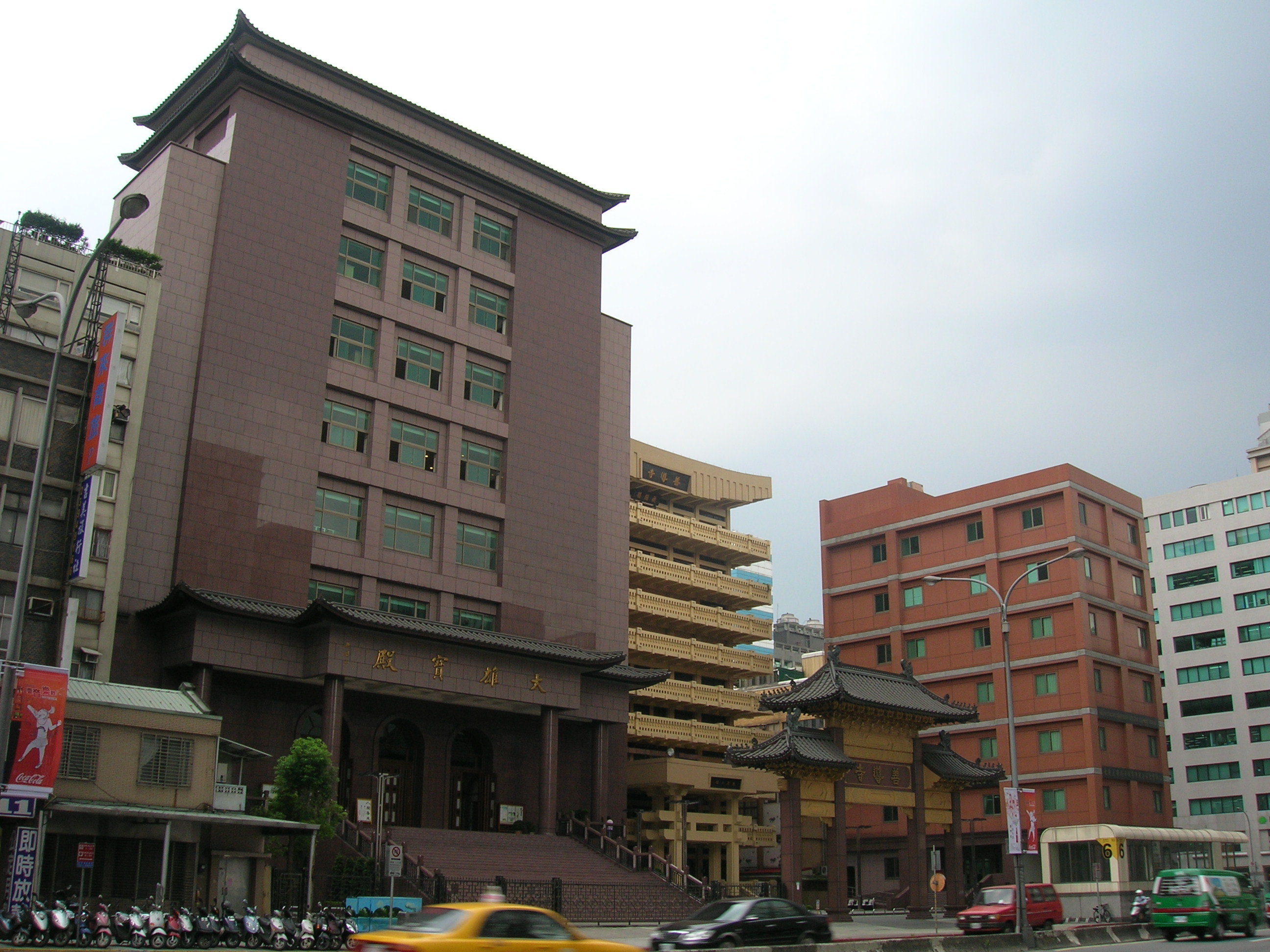

- Taiwan

Religion
- Affiliation: Buddhism

Location
- Location: Zhongzheng, Taipei, Taiwan
- Coordinates: 25°02′44″N 121°31′29″E

Architecture
- Type: Buddhist temple
- Completed: 1926

Website
- Official website (in Chinese)

The Shandao Temple (traditional Chinese: 善導寺; simplified Chinese: 善导寺; pinyin: Shàndǎo Sì) is a temple in Zhongzheng District, Taipei, Taiwan. It is the largest Buddhist temple in Taipei.

== History ==
Shandao Temple was built in Japanese rule period. It was called Jōdo-shū Taihoku Betsu-in (淨土宗臺北別院), which was a branch temple of Jōdo-shū.

== Transportation ==
Shandao Temple is accessible within walking distance East from Shandao Temple Station of the Taipei Metro.

== See also ==
- Buddhism in Taiwan
- Yin Shun, Abbot (1956-1957)
- Linji Huguo Chan Temple, Zhongshan District
- Nung Chan Monastery, Beitou District
- List of temples in Taiwan
- List of tourist attractions in Taiwan
