= Zhongshan District, Taipei =

District of Taipei, Taiwan

Coordinates: 25°04′08″N 121°31′59″E

Zhongshan 中山區 Chungshan, Jhongshan
- District
- Zhongshan District
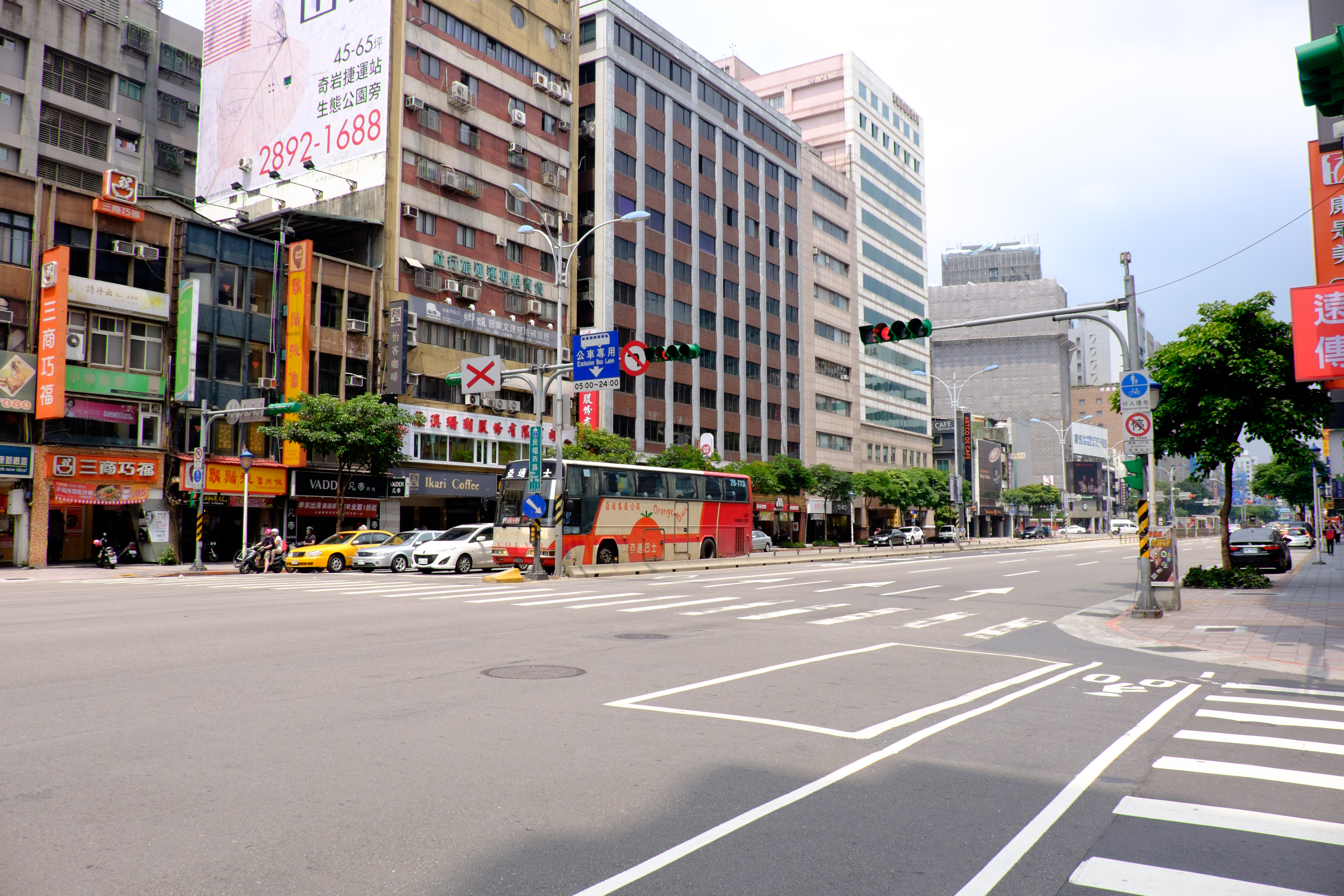

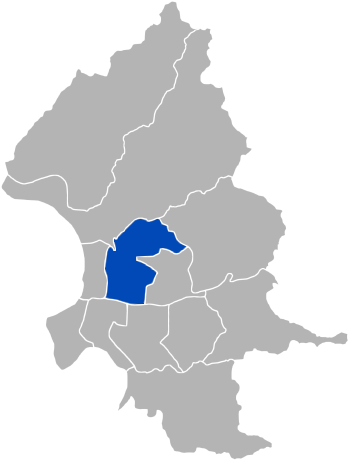
- Zhongshan District in Taipei City
- Country: Republic of China (Taiwan)
- Special Municipality: Taipei
- Region: Western Taipei
- Divisions: List: 42 villages; 868 neighborhoods

Area
  - Total: 13.68 km^{2} (5.28 sq mi)
  - Rank: 6th

Population (January 2023)
  - Total: 213,393
  - Rank: 6th
  - Density: 15,600/km^{2} (40,400/sq mi)
- Postal code: 104
- Website: zsdo.gov.taipei (in Chinese)

Zhongshan District, Taipei
- Traditional Chinese: 中山區
- Simplified Chinese: 中山区
Transcriptions
Standard Mandarin
- Hanyu Pinyin: Zhōngshān Qū
- Wade–Giles: Chung^{1}-shan^{1} Ch'ü^{1}
- Tongyong Pinyin: Jhongshan Cyu
Southern Min
- Hokkien POJ: Tiong-san-khu

Niou-Pu (old name)
- Chinese: 牛埔
Transcriptions
Standard Mandarin
- Hanyu Pinyin: Niúbù

Zhongshan District office

Zhongshan District (Chinese: 中山區) is an administrative district of Taipei City.

== Economy ==
In the 1970s, the district was recognized as the center of the city's tourist industry, with large hotels and international restaurants. The interest from tourists allowed the district to develop as a center of international business.

In recent decades, the district's economy and its population have both contracted, due in part to the decentralisation of industrial and manufacturing activities. Parts of Taipei's "financial core" (that once centred on the Zhongshan District) have been moved to other districts.

Between 1991 and 1996, the district lost 2,600 jobs while the rest of Taipei experienced increased jobs growth (120,000 jobs in the same period). Between 1991 and 1999, the district's population decreased by more than 21,000, accounting for 27.6% of Taipei's total population decrease during that period. According to some economists, the decrease in population and jobs allowed an informal sex industry to thrive in the district leading to an increased crime rate.

Tatung Company, PXmart, and Uni Air have their headquarters in the district.

The Taiwanese subsidiary of American Megatrends, AMI Taiwan (美商安邁科技股份有限公司台灣分公司), is headquartered in Zhongshan District.

== Recreation ==
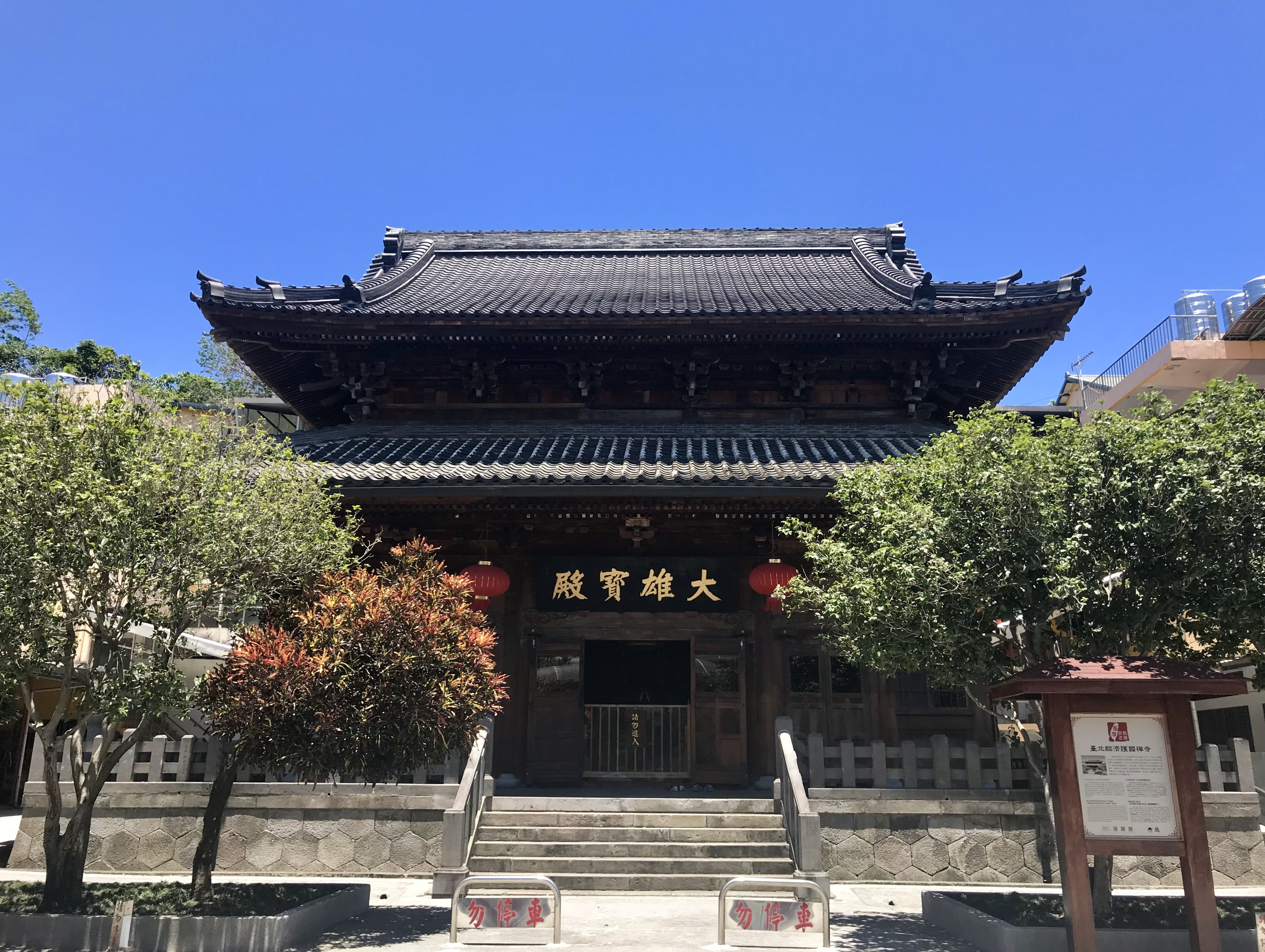
Linji Huguo Chan Temple is a Japanese Buddhist temple.

The district features many recreational areas which include Rongxing Garden Park, Xinsheng Park, Yingfeng Riverside Park, Meiti Riverside Park, Zhongshan Fine Arts Park, Dajia Riverside Park and Taipei Municipal Children's Recreation Area.

Historical buildings and museums include Lin An Tai Historical House and Museum, Miniatures Museum of Taiwan, Museum of Jade Art, Suho Memorial Paper Museum and Taipei Film House.

The National Revolutionary Martyrs' Shrine is located in the district, dedicated to those who died trying to turn China into a republic. The district also has a Fine Arts Museum and the Lin An Tai Historical House and Museum.

Another major tourist attraction is the Xingtian Temple (行天宮), which is dedicated to Guan Gong, the Martial God of Loyalty and Righteousness. Nearby the Yuanshan Metro Station is the Zhongshan Soccer Stadium, which was built on land that used to be the headquarters of the US military presence on Taiwan when the US still had diplomatic ties with the Republic of China. Not surprisingly, Zhongshan has a large pub and bar district and the Zhongshan Metro Mall.

Linji Huguo Chan Temple (臨濟護國禪寺) was commenced in 1900 and completed in 1911; it is one of the very few Japanese-style Buddhist Temples that were well-preserved in Taiwan.

== Other places ==
The northernmost part of Zhongshan District is known as Dazhi. The former ROC President Chiang Ching-kuo lived here at the Seven Seas Residence. In this region, there is also the Dominican International School, which is a private English language Catholic school serving kindergarten to high school.

Taipei's equivalent to "Little Manila" lies in the Zhongshan District in the region near St. Christopher's (Catholic) Church. Every Sunday, many Filipino domestic workers and laborers attend mass at the church and relax around the surrounding Filipino grocery stores and eateries.

The Zhongshan District is also home to a number of wedding photo shops particularly along the 2nd and 3rd sections of Zhongshan North Road. Access to this district by transit is very convenient with 6 Taipei Metro stations (2 on the Wenshan Line and 4 on the Tamsui Line). Also a number of new stations are under construction as part of Phase 2 of the Taipei Metro expansion plan. Like the rest of Taipei City, Zhongshan District is serviced by an extensive public bus system that supplements the Taipei Metro. Also, numerous private bus companies operate buses into this district to other parts of Taiwan such as Taoyuan City and Kaohsiung.

== Institutions ==
- Bureau of Energy
- Ministry of National Defense
- Republic of China Air Force General Headquarters
- Taiwan Institute of Economic Research
- Taipei Broadcasting Station

== Education ==
- Taipei Municipal Datong High School
- Taipei Municipal Zhongshan Girls High School
- National Taipei University (Taipei Campus)
- Shih Chien University (Taipei Campus)
- Taipei Municipal Dazhi Senior High School

== Transportation ==
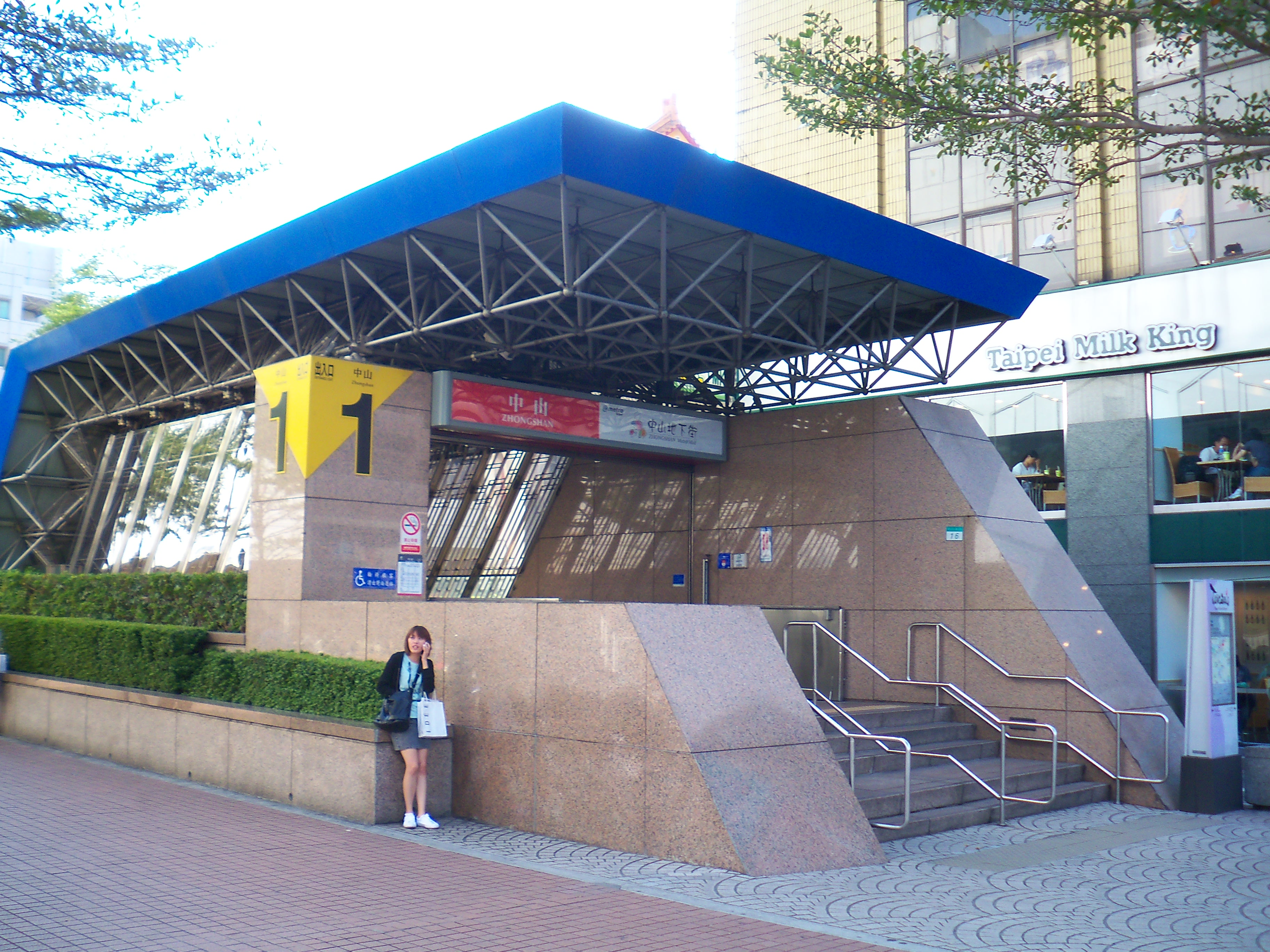
Zhongshan Station

On a historical note, Zhongshan North Road, which crosses the district, was often used by Chiang Kai-shek to get to his home in Shilin. All traffic was stopped when this occurred, as everybody had to salute the leader. Military police during martial law often lined the street, as this road was used by numerous political and military leaders, some of whom stayed at the Grand Hotel in Yuanshan.

Zhongshan Road, along with Zhongxiao Road (which runs west to east), denote the compass directions of roads in Taipei City. For instance, when Zhongshan South Rd intersects with Zhongxiao Road, it becomes Zhongshan North Road. Similarly, When Zhongxiao West Road intersects with Zhongshan Road, it becomes Zhongxiao East Road. This methodology can be applied for most roads in Taipei City.

Zhongshan District is served by the following stations of the Taipei Metro:

- Zhongshan Junior High School metro station
- Dazhi metro station
- Jiannan Road metro station
- Shuanglian metro station
- Yuanshan metro station
- Xingtian Temple metro station
- Zhongshan Elementary School metro station
- Zhongshan metro station
- Minquan West Road metro station
- Songjiang Nanjing metro station
- Nanjing Fuxing metro station

== See also ==
- District (Taiwan)
