= Minquan West Road metro station =

Metro station in Taipei, Taiwan

Minquan West Road / 民權西路
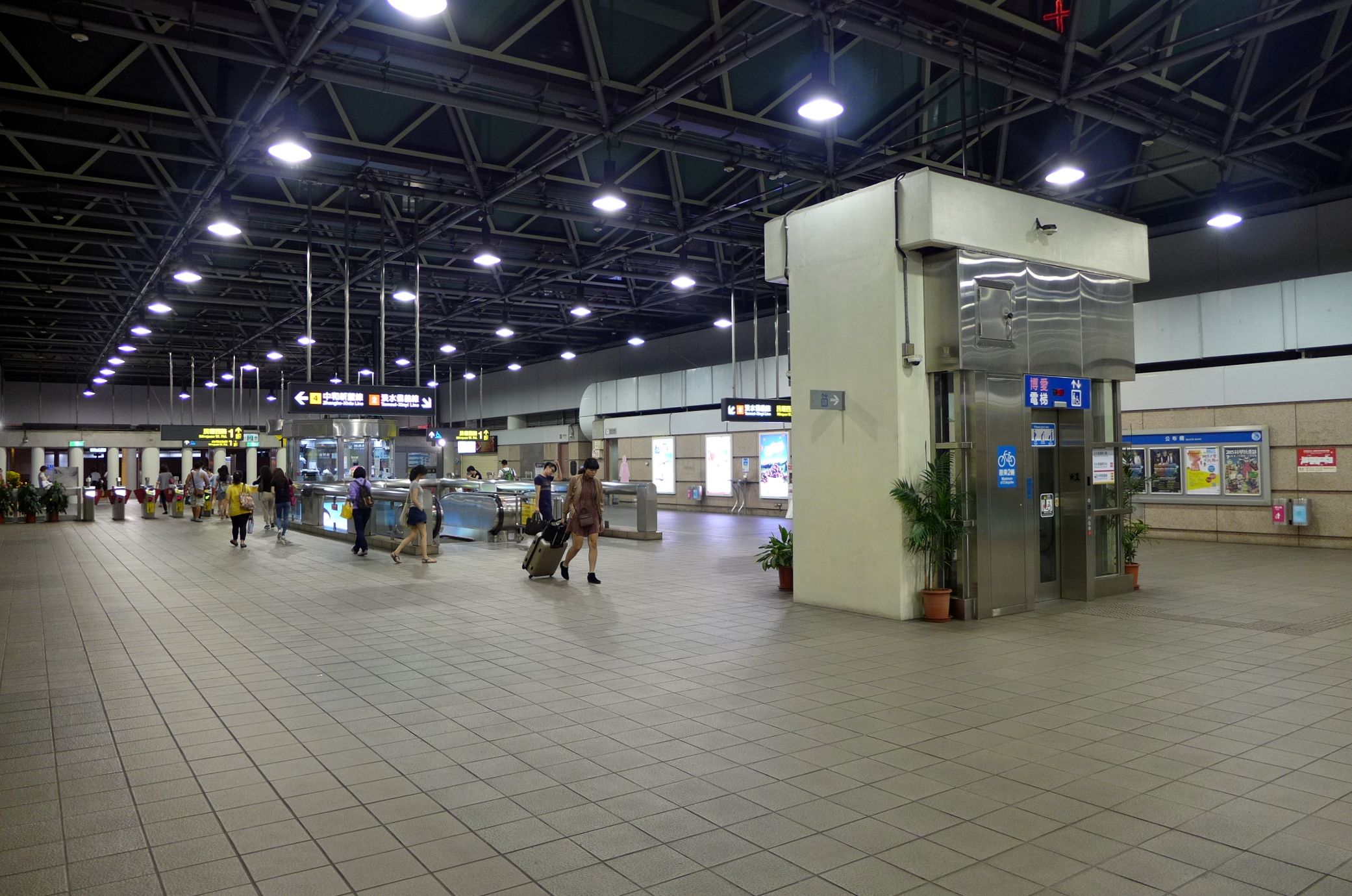
- Concourse

Chinese name
- Traditional Chinese: 民權西路
- Simplified Chinese: 民权西路
- Literal meaning: Civil Rights West Road
Transcriptions
Standard Mandarin
- Hanyu Pinyin: Mínquán Xīlù
- Bopomofo: ㄇㄧㄣˊ ㄑㄩㄢˊ ㄒㄧ ㄌㄨˋ
- Wade–Giles: Min²-ch'uan² Hsi¹-lu⁴
Hakka
- Pha̍k-fa-sṳ: Mìn-khièn-sî-lu
Southern Min
- Tâi-lô: Bîn-kuân-se-lōo

General information
- Location: 72 Minquan W Rd; Zhongshan and Datong Districts, Taipei; Taiwan
- Coordinates: 25.0629°N 121.5197°E
- System: Taipei Metro station
- Lines: Zhonghe–Xinlu line Tamsui–Xinyi line

Construction
- Structure type: Underground
- Cycle facilities: Access available

Other information
- Station code: ,
- Website: web.metro.taipei/e/stationdetail2010.asp?ID=O11+R13-055

History
- Opened: 1997-03-28

Key dates
- 2010-11-03: Zhonghe–Xinlu line added

Passengers
- 2017: 16.506 million per year ▼1.15%
- Rank: (Ranked 36 of 119)

Services
Preceding station	Taipei Metro	Following station
Shuanglian towards Xiangshan or Daan	Tamsui–Xinyi line	Yuanshan towards Tamsui or Beitou
Zhongshan Elementary School towards Nanshijiao	Zhonghe–Xinlu line	Daqiaotou towards Huilong or Luzhou
Location

Minquan West Road (Chinese: 民權西路; pinyin: Mínquán Xīlù, formerly transliterated as Minchuan West Road Station until 2003) is a metro station in Taipei, Taiwan served by Taipei Metro. It is a transfer station between Tamsui–Xinyi line and Zhonghe–Xinlu line.

== Station overview ==
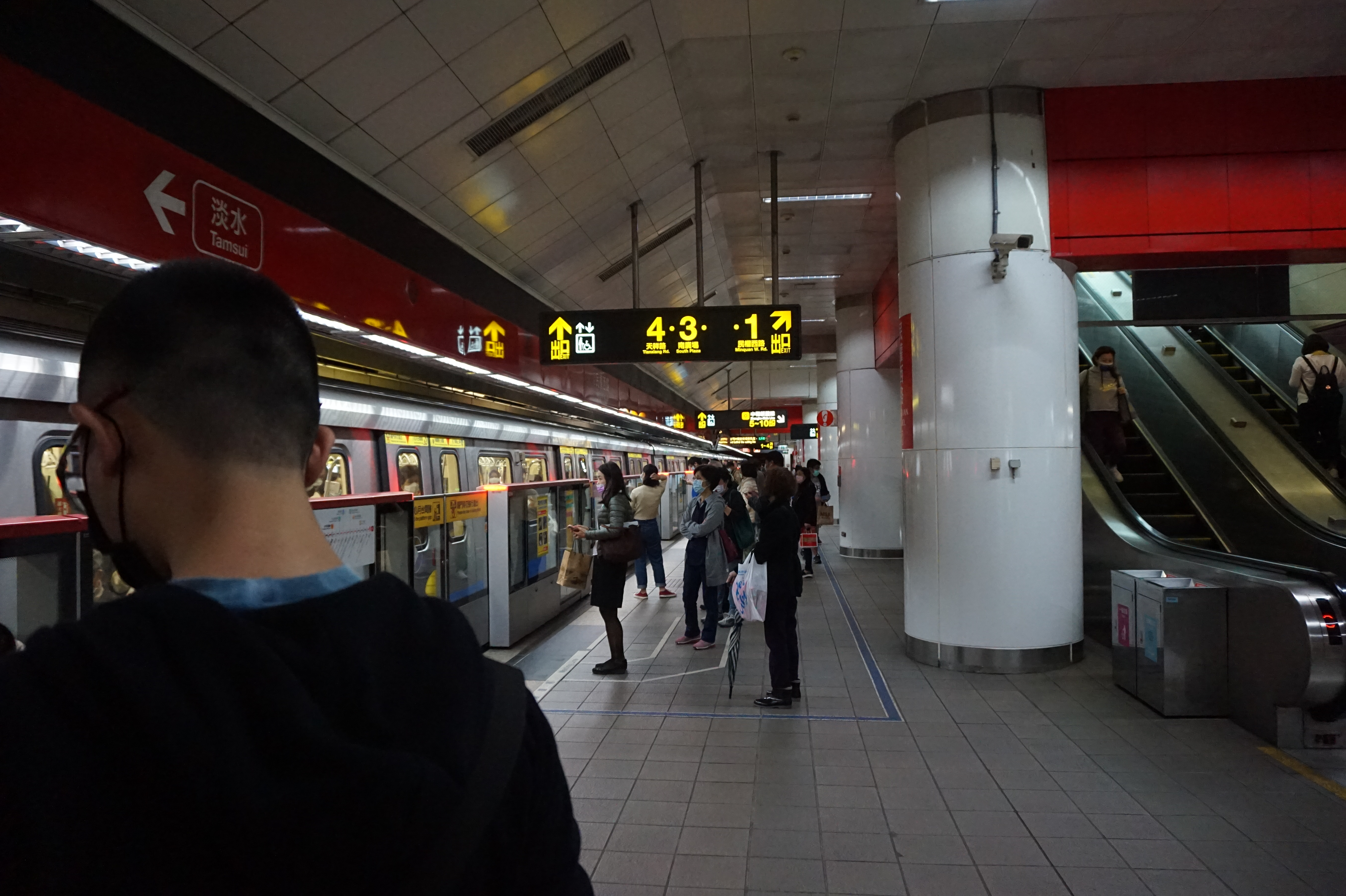
Tamsui Line platform

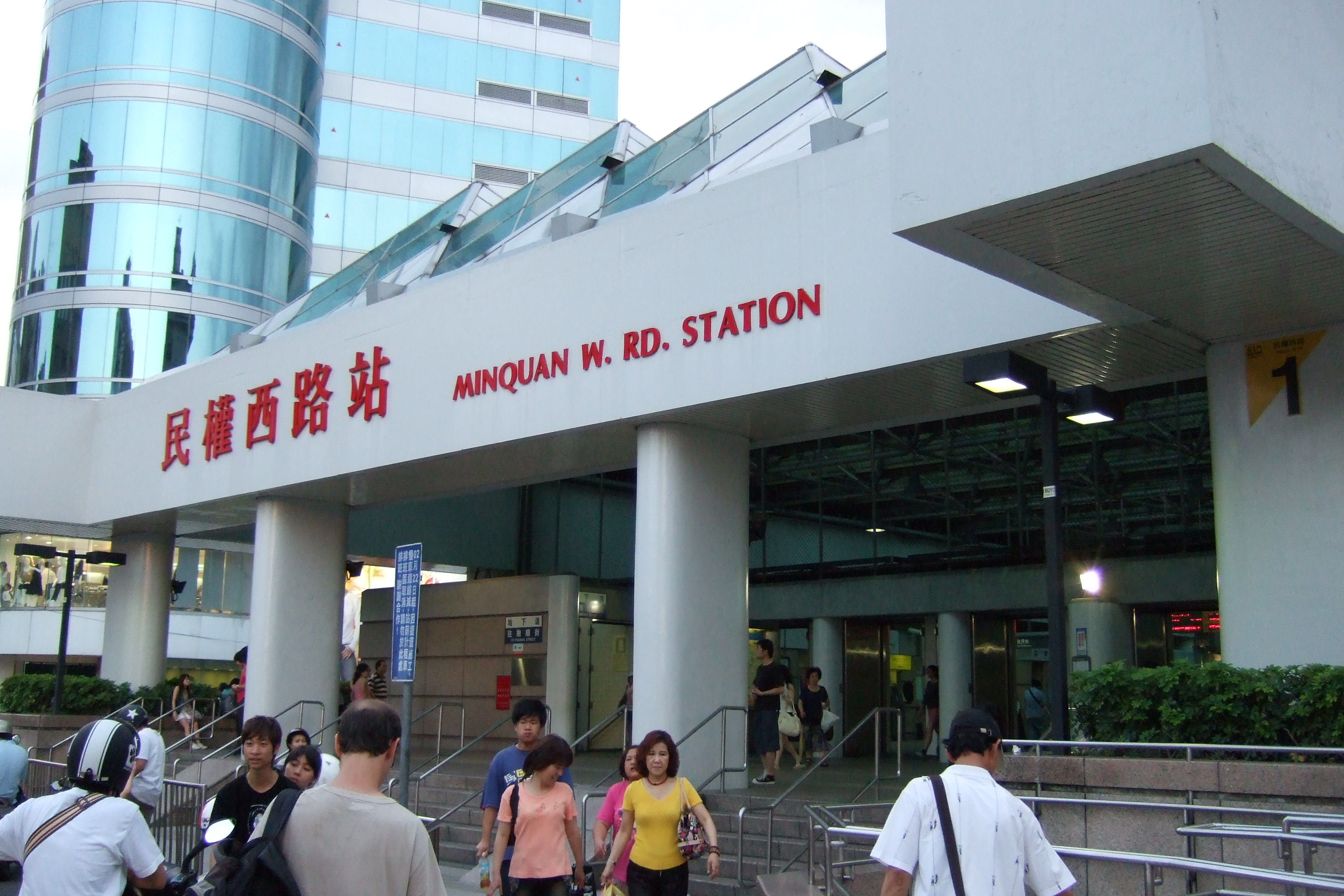
Station front

The station is a three-level, underground structure with two island platforms and ten exits. The washrooms are inside the entrance areas.

The station is situated on Minquan West Road, near Chengde Road. The Tamsui–Xinyi line station is underneath the metro park, while the Zhonghe–Xinlu line station is located underneath Minquan West Road.

=== History ===
The station was opened on 28 March 1997 for the Tamsui-Xinyi Line. On 1 June 2003; the Xinzhuang Line construction began on the still-operational station. This station was opened on 3 November 2010 for the Xinzhuang Line.

=== Construction ===
With the opening of the Xinzhuang Line, the station became a three-level underground station with two cross island platforms. Excavation depth is at around 22 meters. The Xinzhuang Line station is 235 meters long and 26 meters wide, with six additional entrances, two vent shafts, and an accessibility elevator.

== Station layout ==
1F	Tamsui line concourse	Entrance/exit, lobby, information desk, automatic ticketing machines, one-way faregates 7-Eleven (outside fare zone), restrooms (north side, inside fare zone)
B1
B1	Underpass
B1	Underpass	(Outside fare zone, near exit 1. Access to Fushun St. and Minquan W. Road.)
B1	Platform 1	← Tamsui–Xinyi line toward Tamsui / Beitou (R14 Yuanshan)
B1	Island platform, doors will open on the left
B1	Platform 2	→ Tamsui–Xinyi line toward Xiangshan / Daan (R12 Shuanglian) →

B2	Xinzhuang line concourse	Escalator to Tamsui Line concourse level, exits 5-10; Information desk, automatic ticket machines, one-way faregates Restrooms (west side, outside fare zone; east side, inside fare zone)
B3	Platform 3	← Zhonghe–Xinlu line toward Luzhou / Huilong (O12 Daqiaotou)
B3	Island platform, doors will open on the left
B3	Platform 4	→ Zhonghe–Xinlu Line toward Nanshijiao (O10 Zhongshan Elementary School) →

=== Exits ===
- Exit 1: Minquan W. Rd. (south side of Minquan W. Rd.)
- Exit 2: Jinxi St. (beside the Chengyuan High School)
- Exit 3: South Plaza (on the linear park)
- Exit 4: Tianxiang Rd. (Lane 70, Minquan W. Rd.)
- Exit 5: Chengde Rd. Sec. 3 (Fushun Rd., near Chengde Rd.)
- Exit 6: Chengyuan High School (southeast side of the intersection of Minquan W. Rd. and Chengde Rd.)
- Exit 7: Zhongshan N. Rd. Sec. 2 (southwest side of the intersection of Minquan W. Rd. and Tianxiang Rd.)
- Exit 8: Zhongshan N. Rd. Sec. 2 (southwest side of the intersection of Minquan W. Rd. and Tianxiang Rd.)
- Exit 9: Zhongshan N. Rd. Sec. 3 (northwest side of the intersection of Minquan W. Rd. and Tianxiang Rd.)
- Exit 10: Zhongshan N. Rd. Sec. 3 (northwest side of the intersection of Minquan W. Rd. and Tianxiang Rd.)

== Around the station ==
- Chiang Wei-shui Memorial Park
- Taipei Bridge
- Tatung University
- Tatung Company Headquarters
- Wunchang Temple
- Zhongshan North Road Wedding Dress Road
- United Bus Services Minquan W. Rd. Station
- Taipei Tatung Recreation Center (between this station and Yuanshan station)
- Chengyuan Senior High School
- Datong Elementary School
- Shuanglian Elementary School
- Hotel Sunroute Taipei (between this station and Zhongshan Elementary School station)
- Fudu Hotel
- Jinxi Park
- Datong Police Department
