= New Taipei Bridge =

Bridge in New Taipei, Taiwan

New Taipei Bridge 新北大橋
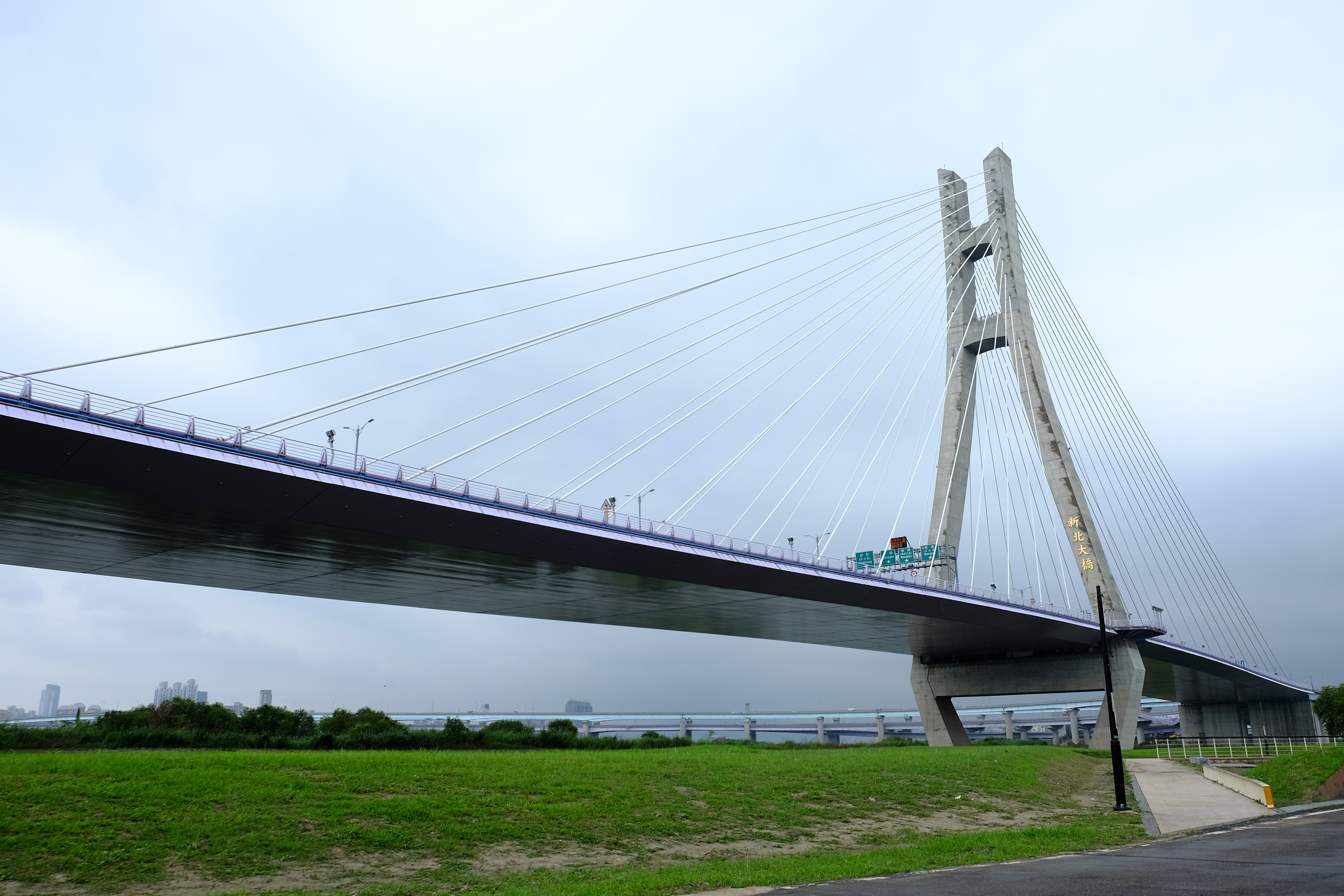
- New Taipei Bridge
- Coordinates: 25.047313°N 121.482943°E
- Carries: New Taipei Huanhe Expressway
- Crosses: Erchong Floodway
- Locale: Sanchong in New Taipei, Taiwan
- Maintained by: New Taipei City Government

Characteristics
- Design: Cable-stayed bridge
- Total length: 1,100 metres (3,609 ft)
- Width: 43.4 metres (142 ft)
- Height: 135.75 metres (445 ft)
- Longest span: 200 metres (656 ft)×2

History
- Construction end: 14 August 2010

The New Taipei Bridge (traditional Chinese: 新北大橋; simplified Chinese: 新北大桥; pinyin: Xīnběi Dàqiáo) is a bridge in New Taipei, Taiwan. It spans the Erchong Floodway and Dahan River, connecting Sanchong District and Banqiao District as part of the New Taipei City Huanhe Expressway. It is Taiwan's eighth cable-stayed bridge and Asia's longest symmetrical single-pylon cable-stayed bridge. The bridge was opened to traffic in 2010.

== Technical specifications ==
The bridge is 1,075 meters long and 43.4 meters wide. Its highest point stands at 135.75 meters (around the height of a 40-storey highrise building). It has four lanes for vehicular traffic, a dedicated motorcycle lane, a bikeway and a pedestrian sidewalk in both directions.

The sidewalks and bikeways connect to the Dahan Riverside Bikeway, Xindian Riverside Bikeway and Erchong Circular Cycling Path.

== Transportation ==
The bridge is accessible from the north at Sanchong Station and the west at Xianse Temple Station of the Taipei Metro.

== Gallery ==
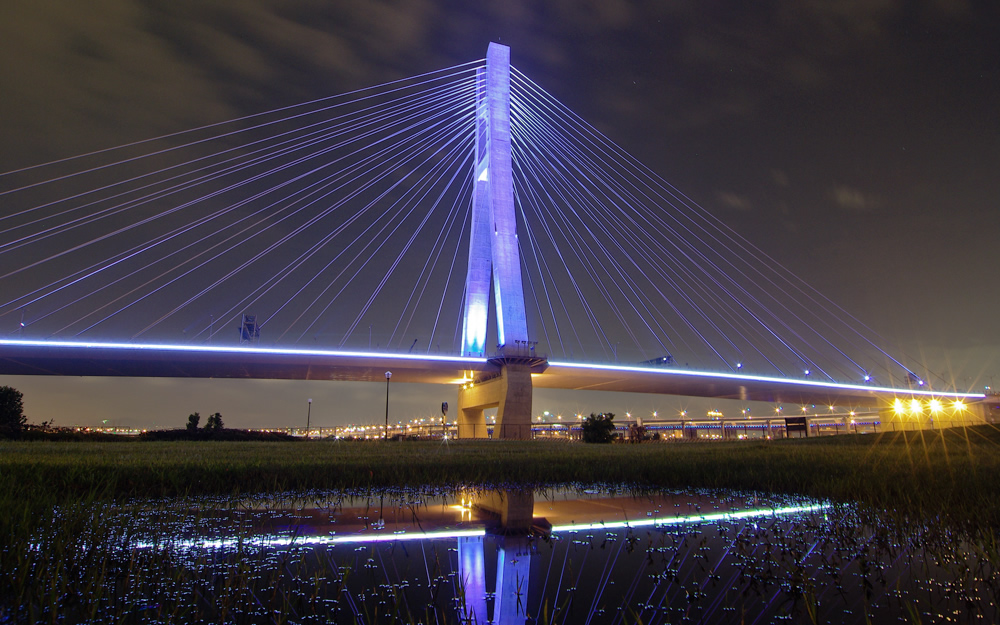
New Taipei Bridge at night.

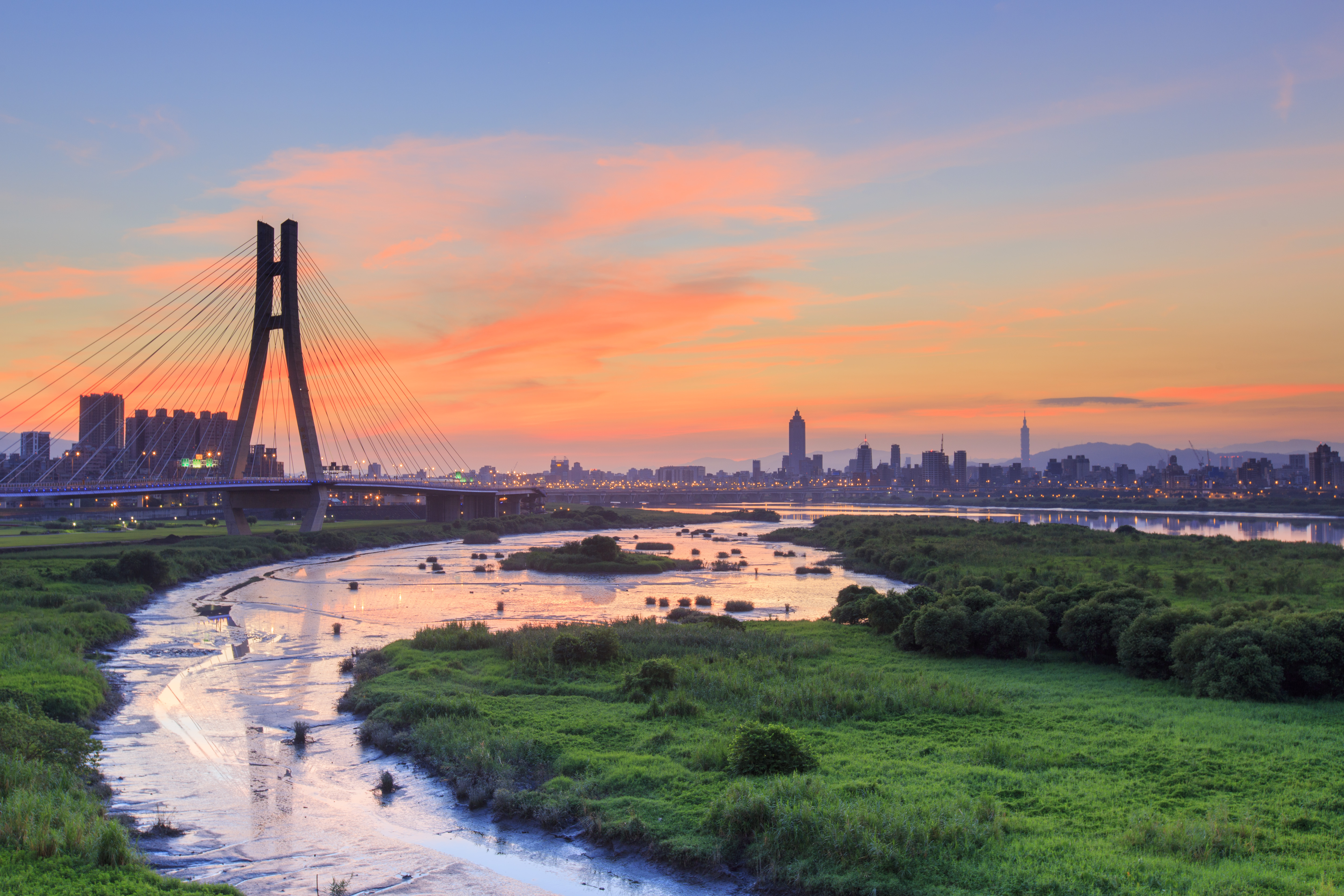
View of New Taipei Bridge and sunset skyline of Taipei in 2014.

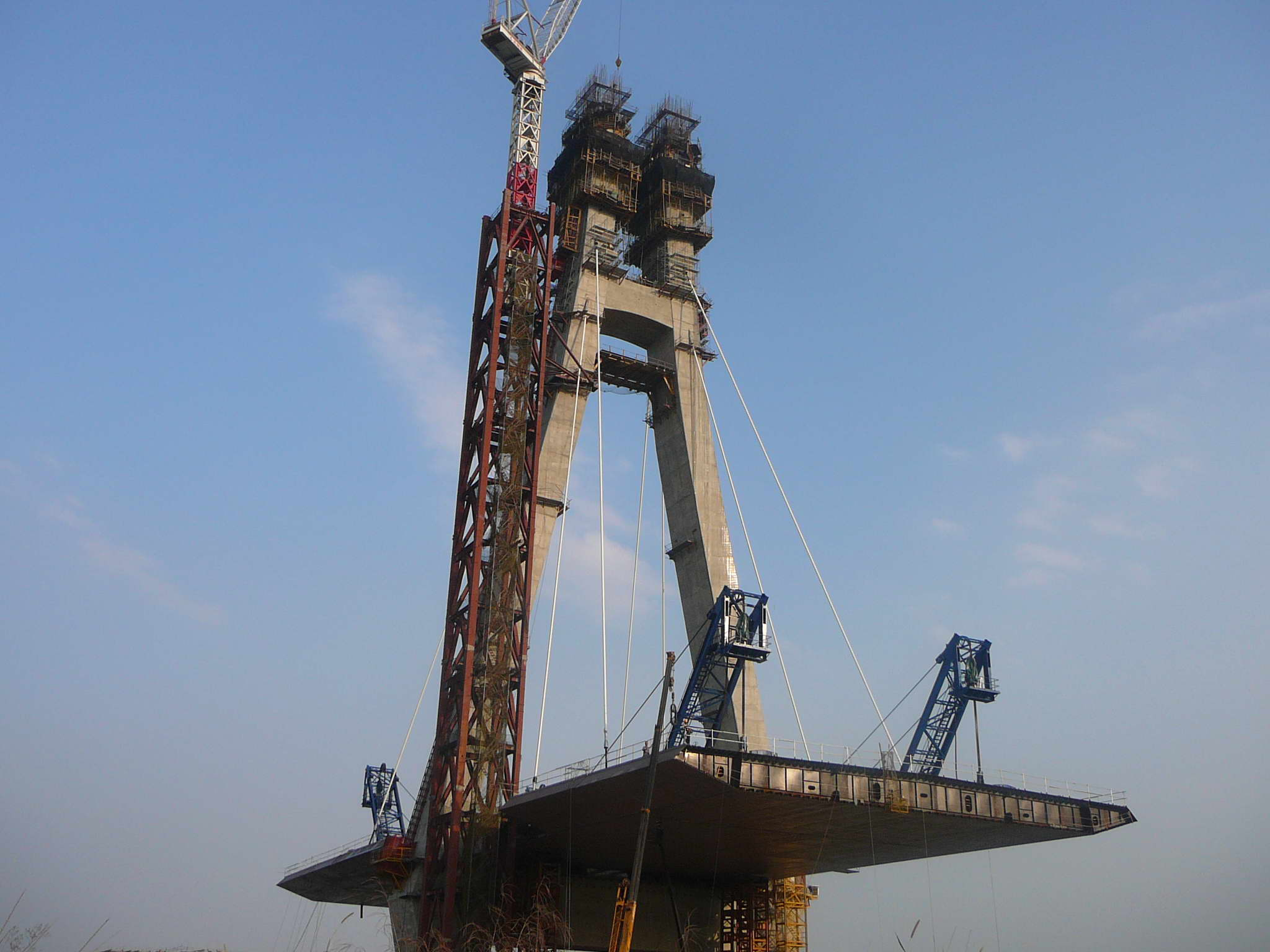
New Taipei Bridge under construction in 2009.

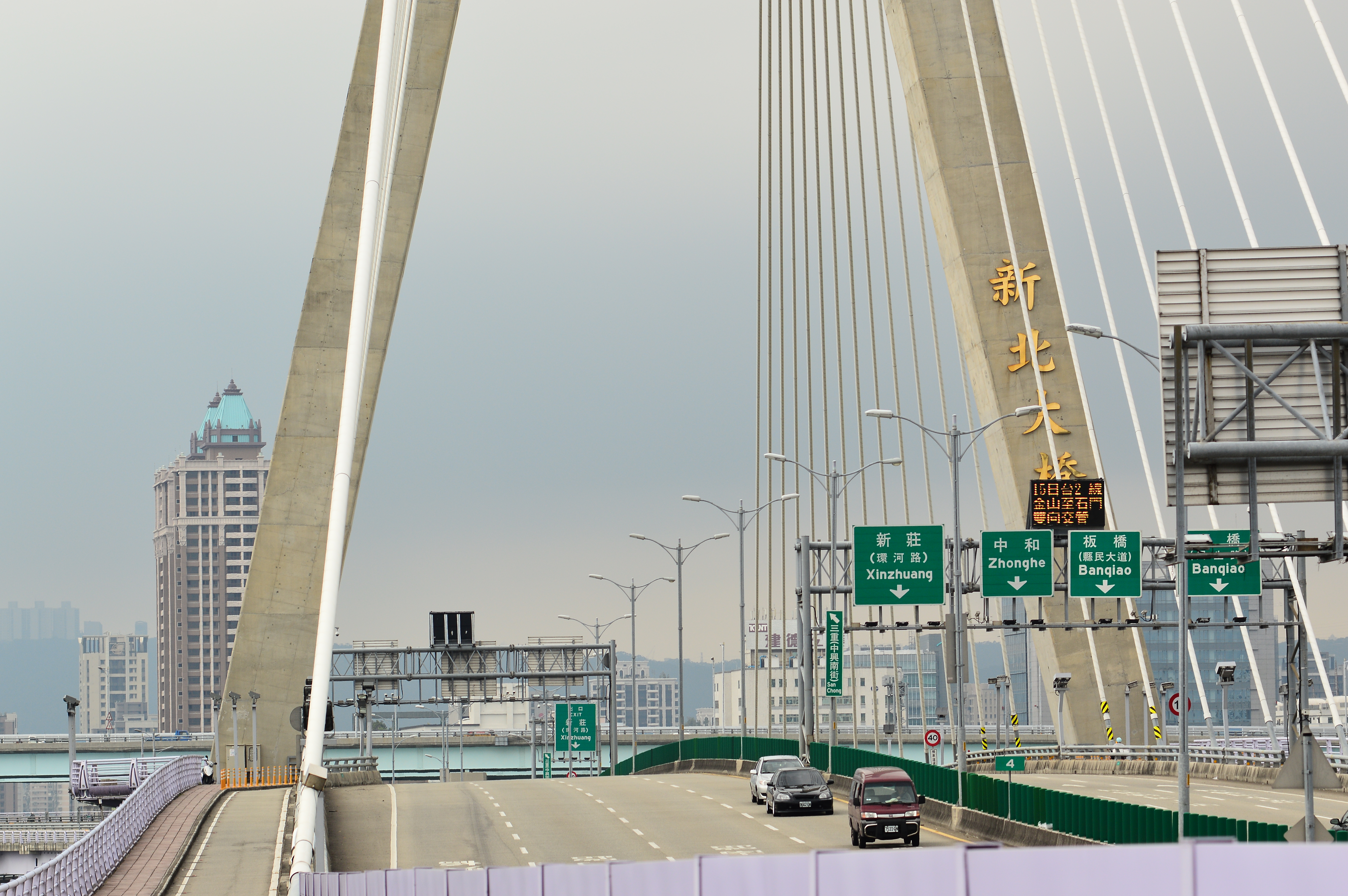
Signs on New Taipei Bridge.

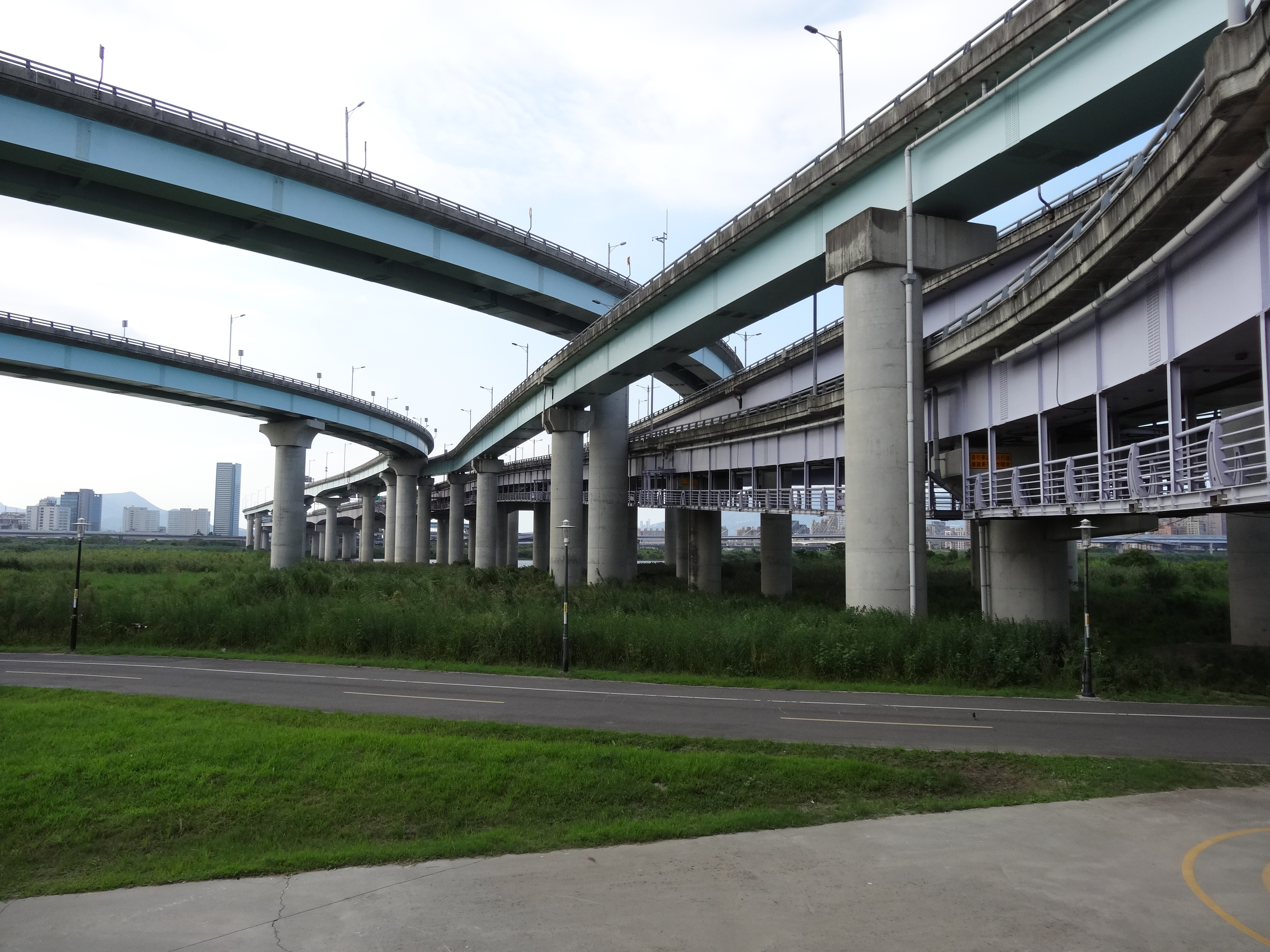
New Taipei Bridge bicycle track.

== See also ==
- List of bridges in Taiwan
- Transportation in Taiwan
