= Danjiang =

Danjiang may refer to:

== China ==
- Dan River (China), a river in Shaanxi, Henan, and Hubei, a tributary of the Han River
- Danjiang Subdistrict (丹江街道), a subdistrict of Dunhua, Jilin
- Danjiang, Guizhou (丹江镇), a town in Leishan County, Guizhou

== Taiwan ==
- Tamsui River, a river in northern Taiwan
- Danjiang Bridge, a bridge over Tamsui River in New Taipei
- Tamkang University, in Tamsui District, New Taipei
