= Sanchong (disambiguation) =

Sanchong is a district in New Taipei City, Taiwan.

Sanchong may also refer to:

- Sanchong metro station, a station of the Zhonghe–Xinlu line located in Sanchong District, New Taipei, Taiwan
- Sanchong (三蟲), "Three Corpses" for Chinese.
