= Danhai New Town =

Taiwanese residential development

Coordinates: 25°11′58″N 121°25′57″E

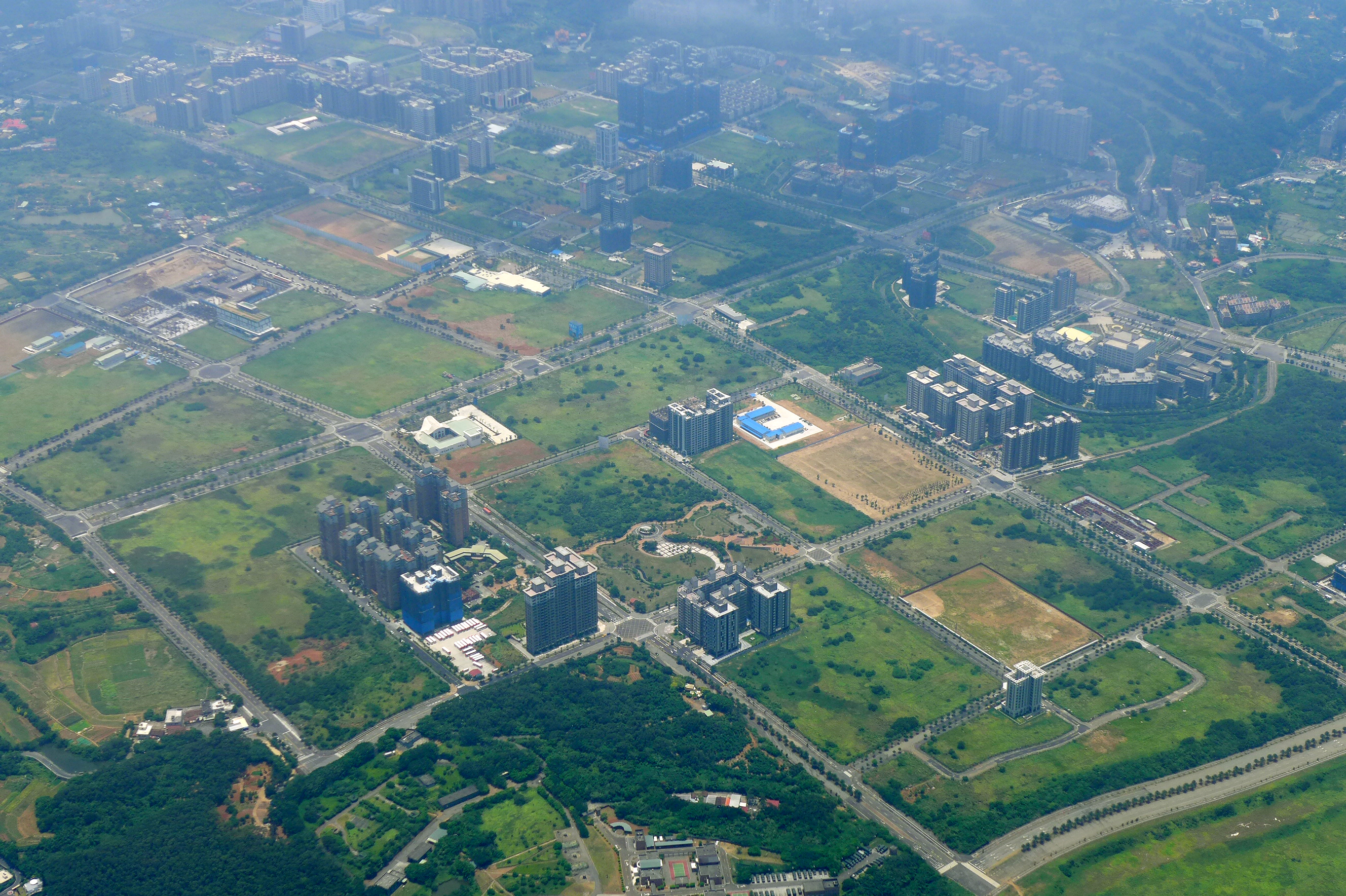
Aerial view of Danhai New Town in 2015.

Danhai New Town (Chinese: 淡海新市鎮; pinyin: Dànhǎi xīn shìzhèn), previously romanized as Tamhai New Town, is a large residential development in Tamsui District, New Taipei, Taiwan. It was first proposed as a new town in 1992. The project aims to create a town using 17.56 km^{2} of land north of central Tamsui to relocate 300,000 people from the overcrowded Taipei metropolitan area. It currently has a population of about 40,000.

== Developmental history ==
The first phase of the project has been completed, but though it was designed to house 130,000 people, only 13,000 have moved in. The second and third stage plans were drawn up in 1995, but never implemented after the Environmental Protection Administration requested that both be submitted to two environmental impact assessments. After many years of delays, in 2013, the agency submitted another development project covering more than 1,100 hectares to an environmental impact assessment under a new name, but which included zones that were designated for development under the second phase of the original plan.

== Transportation ==
Danhai New Town is situated between the prosperous urban area of Taipei and the low population density of Sanzhi, Shimen, Jinshan, etc., which can provide an optimum distance for residents to commute to work on weekdays and to lead a balanced lifestyle of leisure and recreation in the weekends. Major transportation-related constructions in the area include Port of Taipei, Danjiang Bridge, Danhai Light Rail, and Sanzhi-Beitou Expressway, which will determine the future development potential of the new town.

== Amenities ==
=== Higher Education ===
- Taipei University of Marine Technology
- Hwa Hsia University of Technology Tamsui Campus (under planning)

=== Commercial facilities ===
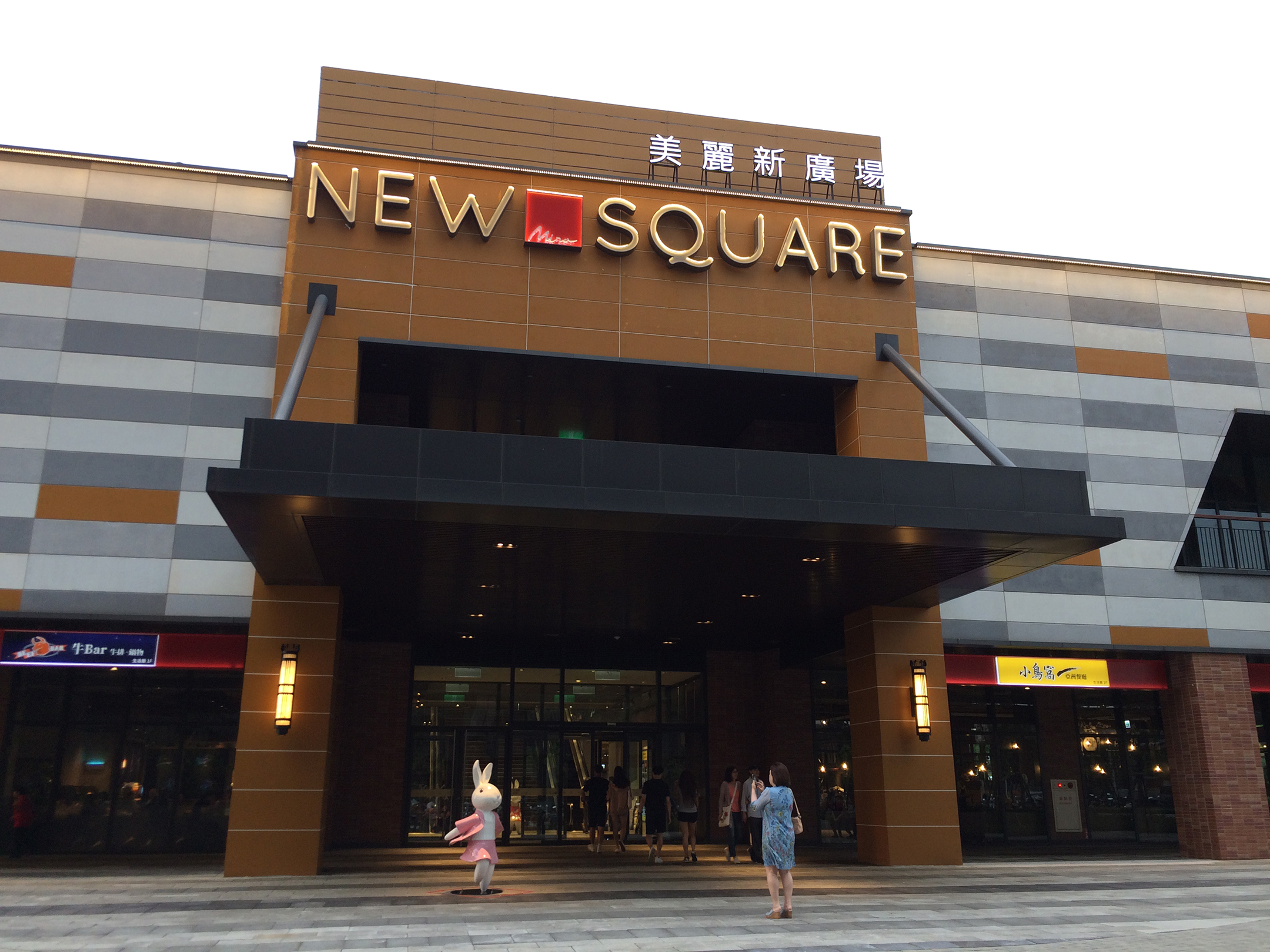
Miranew Square shopping mall

The new town depended on one neighborhood shopping mall: Miranew Square, which opened on February 26, 2019, and houses a cinema complex within the mall. Other commercial facilities include Carrefour Danxin Store and PX Mart Danhai Zhongshan Store, as well as the largest McDonald's in Taiwan.

=== Community and sports facilities ===
Tamsui Children's Park opened in 2018 and serves as a place for children and seniors to relax. Other facilities include Tamsui Sports Center, which opened on September 20, 2014 and includes an indoor swimming pool, basketball court, badminton court, outdoor rock climbing facilities as well as a squash court.

== See also ==
- Danhai light rail
- Danhai New Town light rail station
- Taipei University Special Zone
- Wenzaizhen
