= Taipei University Special Zone =

- Traditional Chinese: 臺北大學特定區
Transcriptions
Standard Mandarin
- Hanyu Pinyin: Táiběi Dàxué Tèdìng Qū

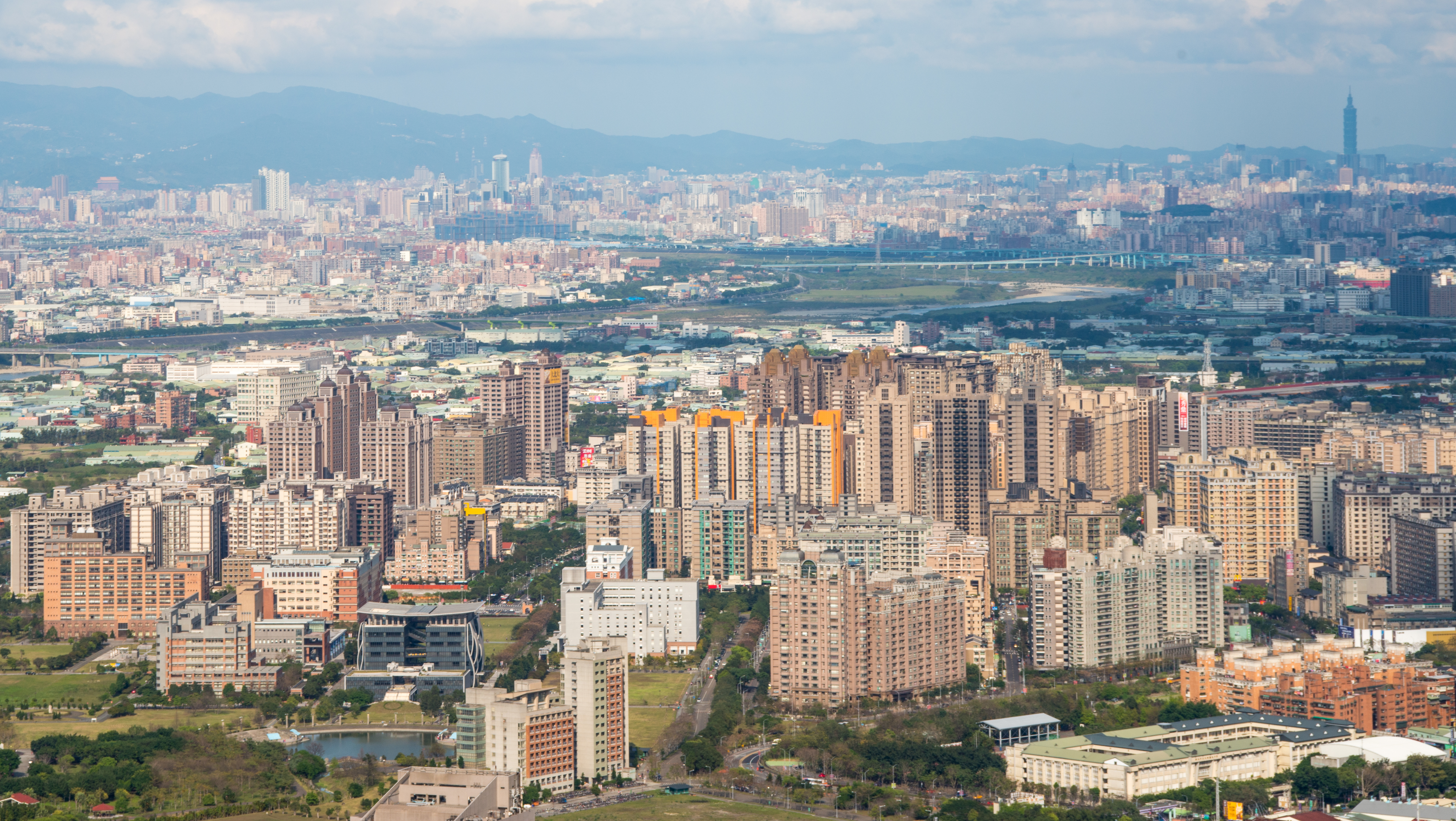
Taipei University Special Zone from Yuanshan

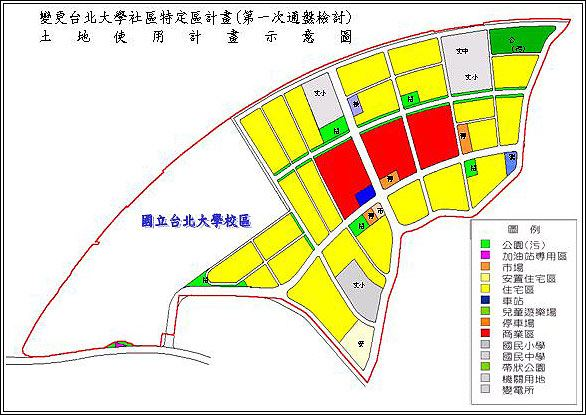
Map of Taipei University Special Zone

Taipei University Special Zone (Chinese: 臺北大學特定區; pinyin: Táiběi Dàxué Tèdìng Qū) is a university town located in the outskirts of Taipei on the border of Sanxia and Shulin Districts.

The university town was established in 1997 when National Taipei University relocated its campus from central Taipei to the area and had its foundations built in the early 2000s. It has a total area of 185.53 hectares. The university town area is the biggest tertiary education hub in Taiwan, including two higher education institutions - National Taipei University as well National Academy for Educational Research.

== Range ==
In general terms, Taipei University Special Zone is bounded on the east by Sanshu Road and Jiayuan Road, on the north and west by Freeway 1, and on the south by Xuecheng Road, Guoqing Road and the section of Fuxing Road between Xuecheng Road and Freeway 1.

== Transport ==
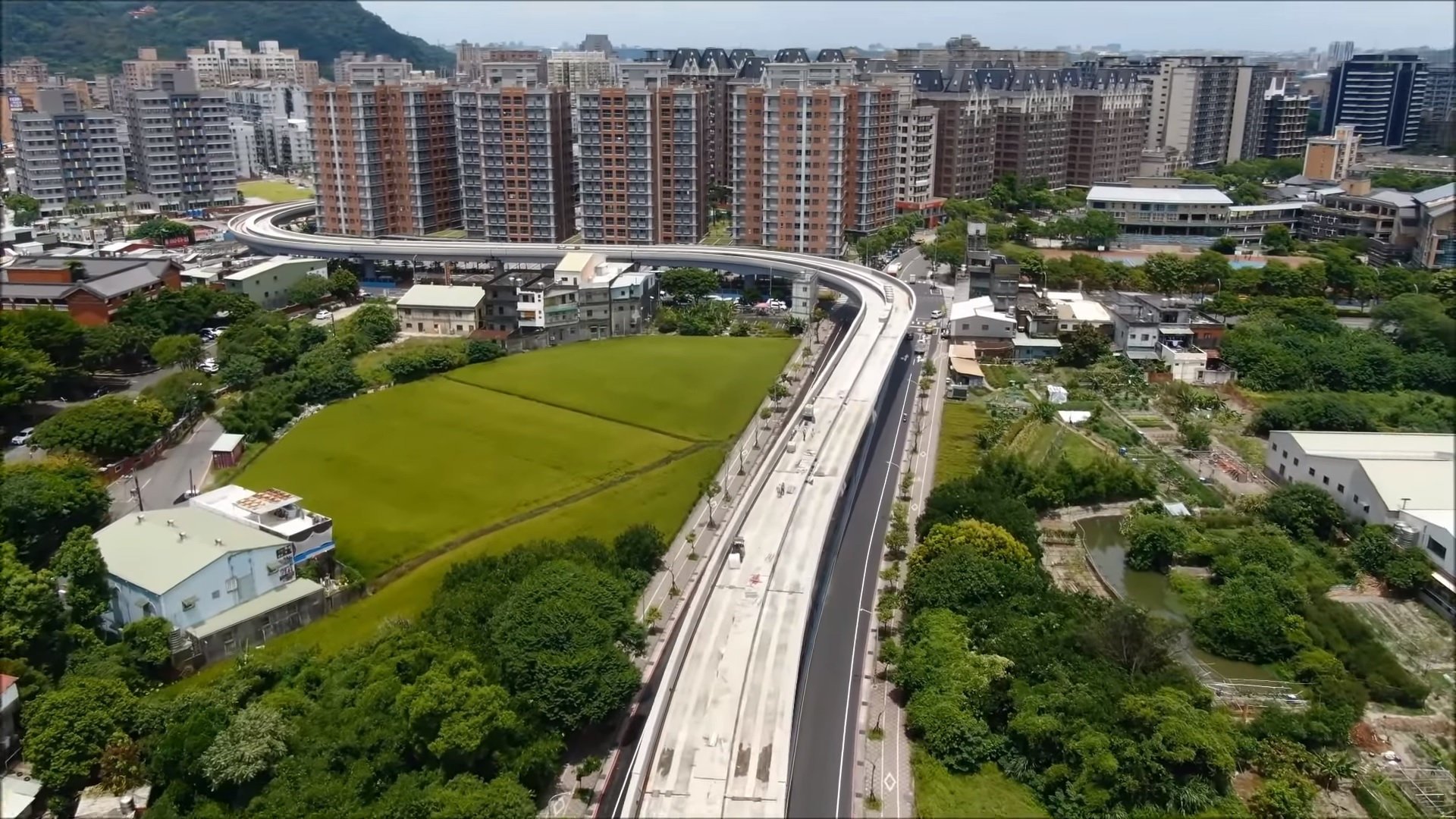
The under construction Sanying Line and apartment buildings in the Special Zone

It only takes about 30 minutes from Taipei University Special Zone to central Taipei City via National Freeway 3. The main arterial roads in the special zone, such as Xueqin Road, Xuecheng Road, Daxue Road and other roads, have inter-regional bus routes with intensive frequency and running on national highways, which can directly reach urban CBDs such as Xinban Special District and Xinyi Planning District.

In terms of rail transportation, the bus ride from Yongning Station on the Taipei Metro Bannan Line from the zone to Tucheng District takes about 12 minutes. The currently under construction Taipei Metro Sanying line also passes through the region, with stations named National Taipei University and Sanxia.

== Gallery ==
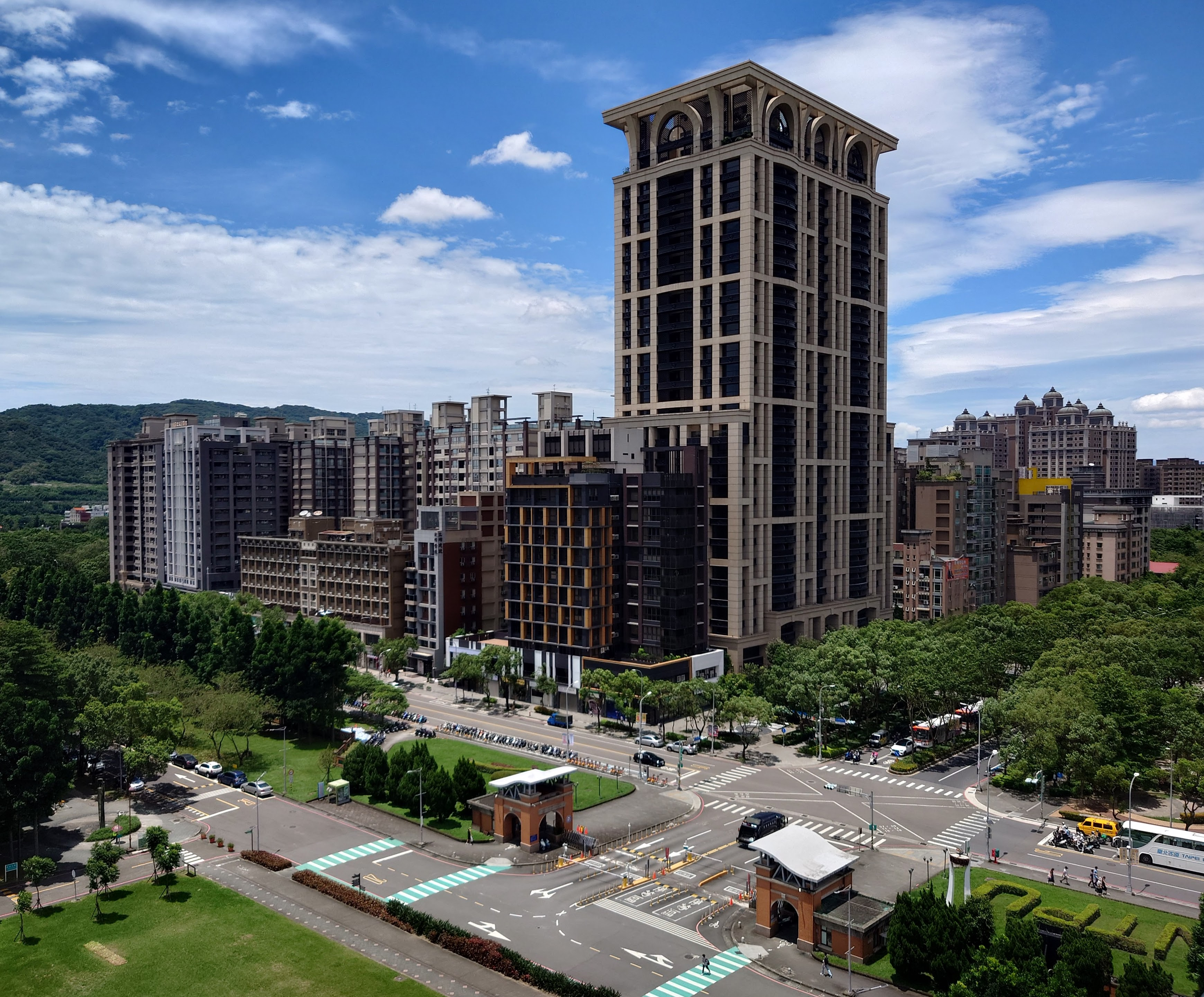

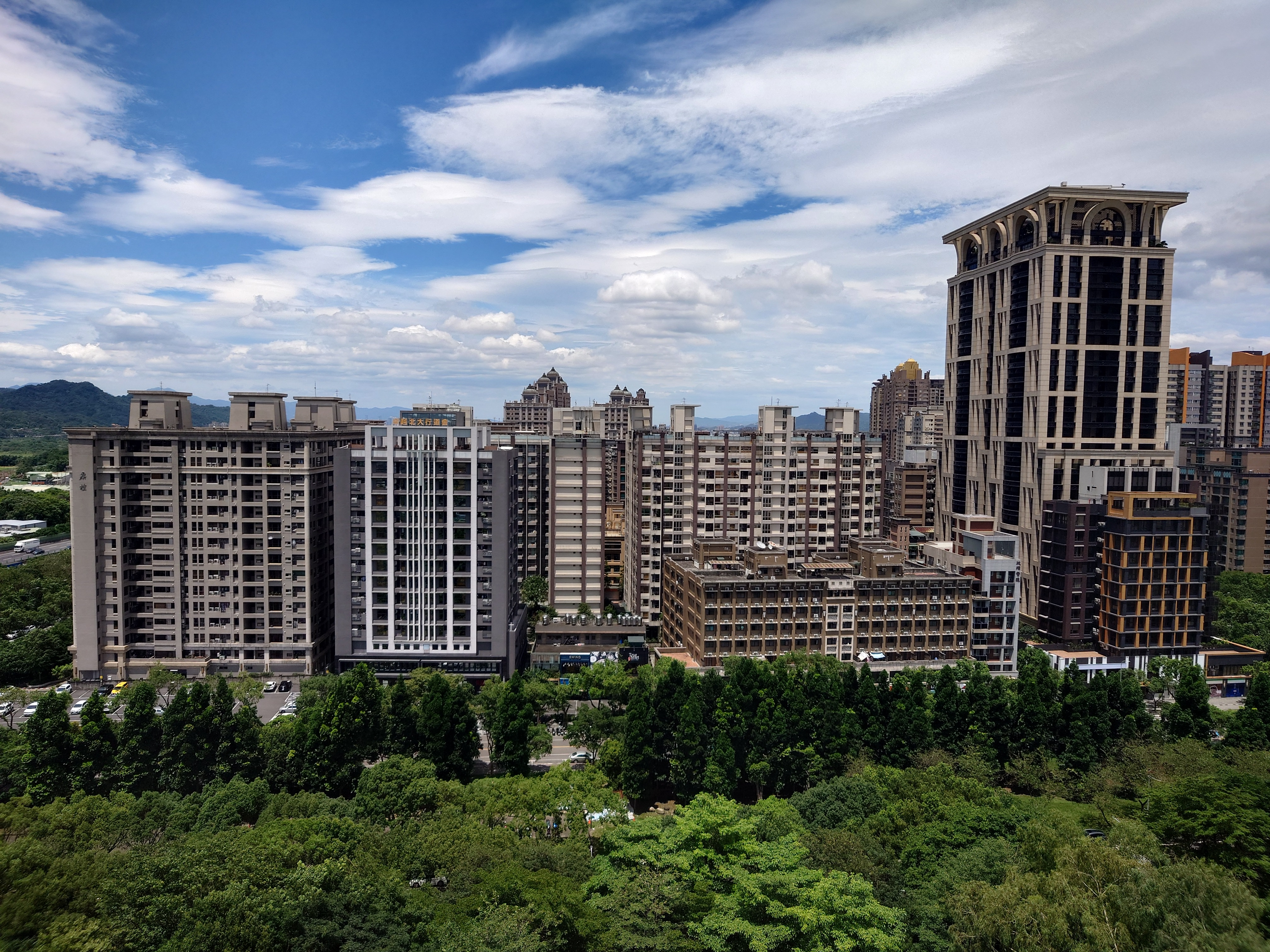

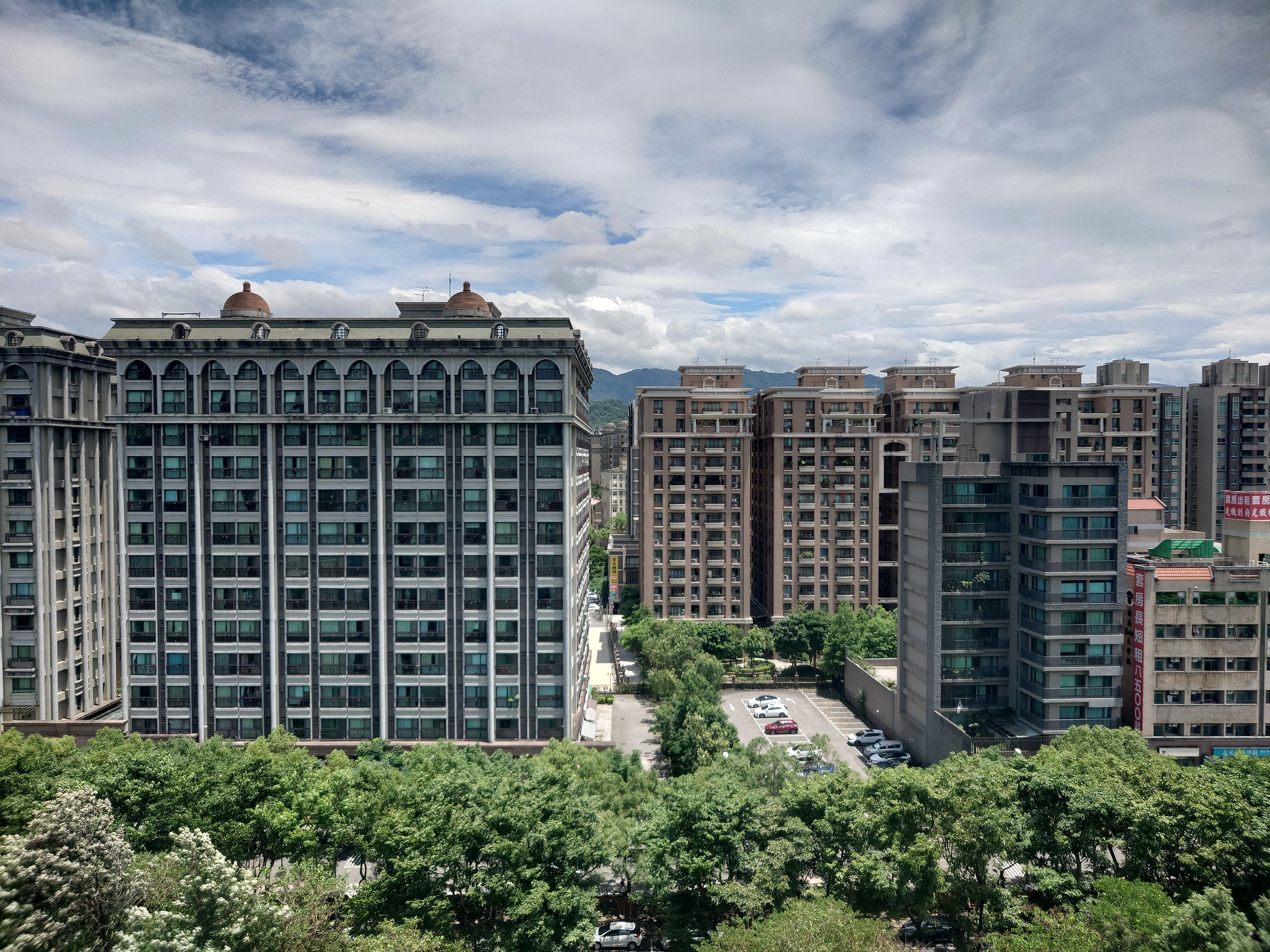

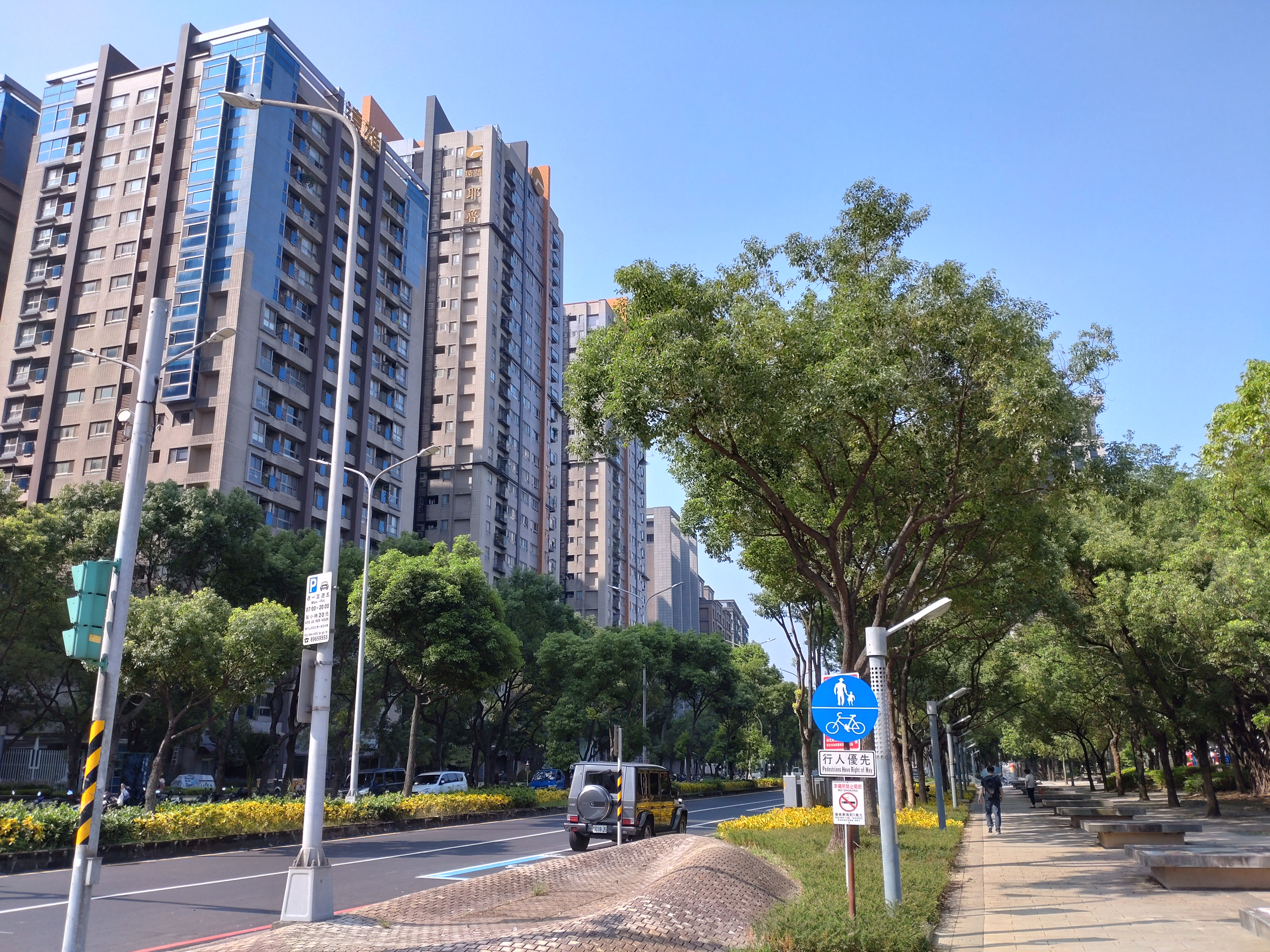

== See also ==
- Danhai New Town
- National Taipei University
