= New Taipei Metropolitan Park =

Park in New Taipei, Taiwan

- Location within Taiwan
- Type: Public park
- Location: Sanchong and Wugu, New Taipei, Taiwan
- Coordinates: 25°3′24″N 121°28′51″E
- Area: 424 ha (1,050 acres)
- Created: 2010
- Operator: New Taipei City Government
- Status: Open year-round
- Website: newtaipei.travel/zh-tw/attractions/detail/110343

New Taipei Metropolitan Park (Chinese: 新北大都會公園) is a park located along the Erchong Floodway in New Taipei, Taiwan. Spanning 424 hectares, the park is approximately 3 times the size of Hyde Park, London and 1.25 times larger than Central Park, and is the largest urban park in northern Taiwan. Designed to offer both recreation and flood prevention, it integrates nature and urban living. The park features extensive green spaces, scenic wetlands, and family-friendly areas such as the Parent-Child Playground, which includes 31 slides themed around Taiwan's indigenous species. Breeze Canal offers opportunities for water sports like canoeing and dragon boat racing, while the Metropolitan Sports Area provides facilities for various outdoor games. The park is accessible by Taipei Metro Sanchong metro station, making it a popular urban retreat for locals and visitors alike.

Construction of the park continues, with ongoing efforts to enhance both its ecological and recreational features. Future developments aim to increase the park's accessibility and offer more facilities to engage with nature, like expanded wetlands and walking trails.

From January to April in 2025, New Taipei Metropolitan Park attracted 18,016,000 visitors, making it the most visited tourist destination in Taiwan of the year.

== See also ==
- List of urban parks by size
