= Miranew Square =

Shopping mall in Tamsui, New Taipei, Taiwan

- 美麗新廣場
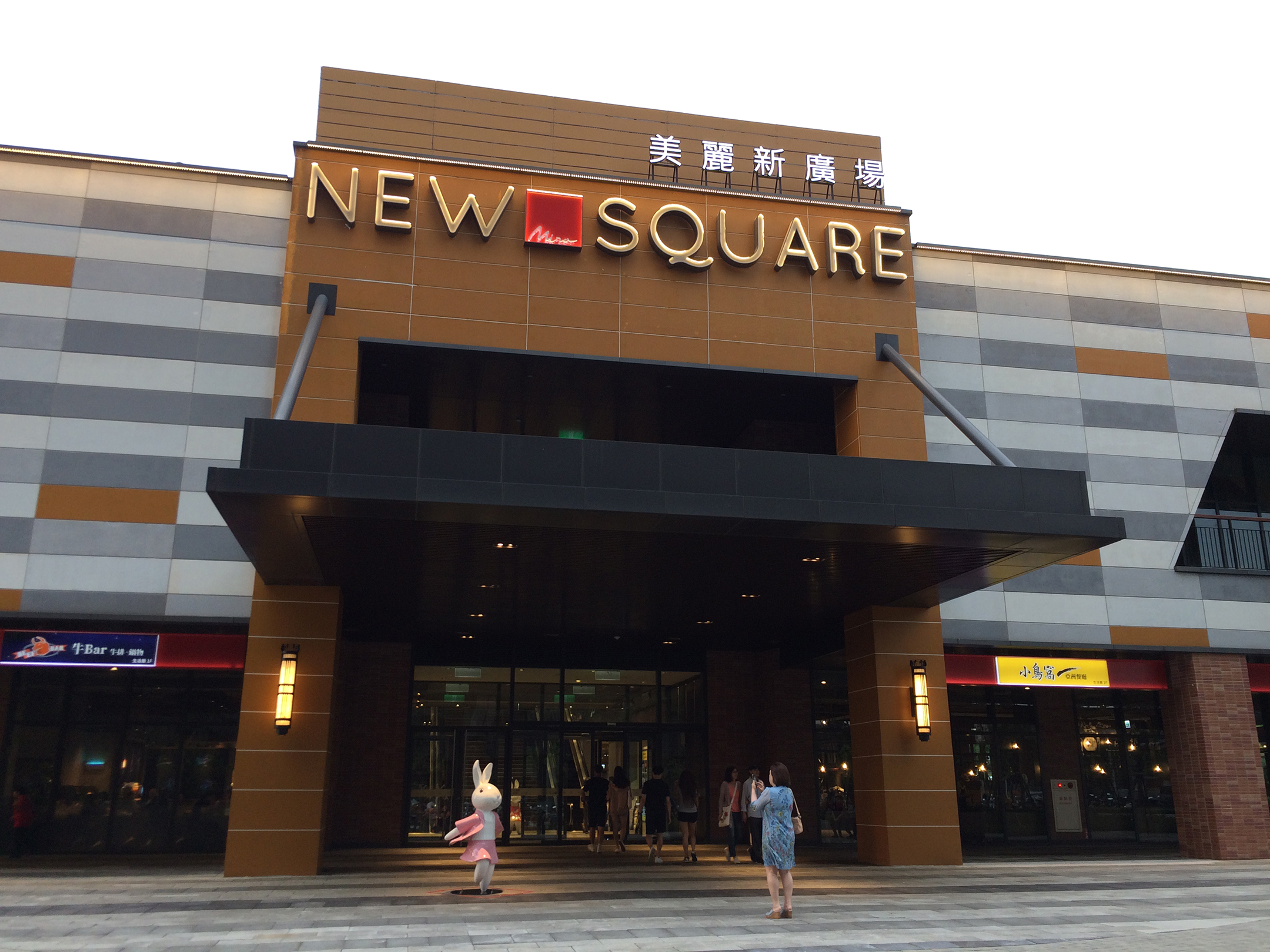
- Location: No. 301, Section 2, Yishan Road, Tamsui District, New Taipei, Taiwan
- Coordinates: 25.2055°N 121.4386°E
- Opened: 26 February 2019
- Manager: Miramar group
- Floor area: 26,400 m^{2} (284,000 sq ft)
- Floors: 2 floors above ground 1 floor below ground
- Public transit: Kanding light rail station
- Website: https://www.miranewsquare.com/

Miranew Square (Chinese: 美麗新廣場) is a shopping mall located in Danhai New Town of Tamsui, New Taipei, Taiwan that opened on 26 February 2019. With a total floor area of around 26,400 m^{2} (284,000 sq ft), the medium-sized mall has 2 floors above ground and 1 floor below ground and it is the northernmost shopping mall in Taiwan. Main core stores of the mall include Miranew Cinemas and various themed restaurants.

== Public transportation ==
The mall is located in close proximity to Kanding light rail station, which is served by the Danhai Light Rail.

== See also ==
- List of tourist attractions in Taiwan
- Danhai New Town
