= Sanchong metro station =

Metro station in New Taipei, Taiwan

Sanchong / A2 三重
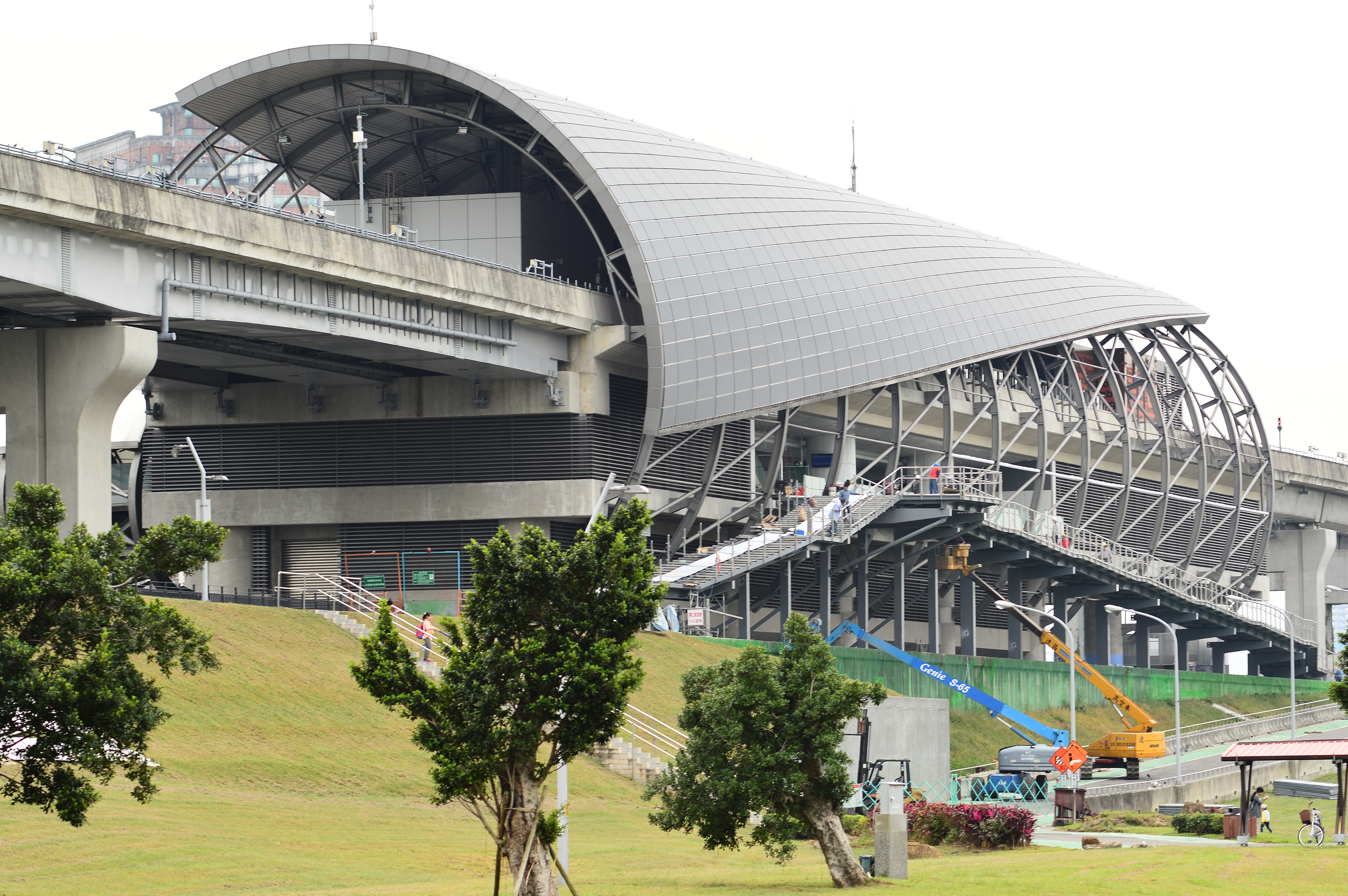

General information
- Location: B1F 36 Jieyun Rd; Sanchong, New Taipei; Taiwan
- Coordinates: 25.0558°N 121.4847°E
- Operator: Taipei Rapid Transit Corporation; Taoyuan Metro Corporation
- Lines: Zhonghe–Xinlu line; Taoyuan Airport MRT
- Connections: Bus stop

Construction
- Structure type: Underground/elevated

Other information
- Station code: / A2

History
- Opened: 2012-01-05

Key dates
- 2017-03-02: Airport MRT added

Passengers
- Taipei Metro: 18,728 daily (December 2024) Taoyuan Metro: 10,431 (entries and exits, daily, August 2025)
- Rank: Taipei Metro: 99 out of 109; Taoyuan Metro: 9 out of 22

Services
| Preceding station | Taipei Metro | Following station |
|---|---|---|
| Cailiao towards Nanshijiao | Zhonghe–Xinlu line | Xianse Temple towards Huilong |
| Preceding station | Taoyuan Metro | Following station |
| Taipei Main Station Terminus | Taoyuan Airport MRT Commuter | New Taipei Industrial Park towards Laojie River |
Taoyuan Airport MRT does not stop here
Location

Sanchong metro station
- Chinese: 三重
Transcriptions
Standard Mandarin
- Hanyu Pinyin: Sānchóng
- Bopomofo: ㄙㄢㄔㄨㄥˊ
Hakka
- Pha̍k-fa-sṳ: Sâm-chhùng

Alternative Chinese name
- Chinese: 三重埔
Transcriptions
Southern Min
- Hokkien POJ: Saⁿ-têng-po͘
- Tâi-lô: Sann-tîng-poo

Sanchong station (Chinese: 三重站) is a station of the Zhonghe–Xinlu line on Taipei Metro and the Taoyuan Airport MRT located in Sanchong District, New Taipei, Taiwan. The Taipei Metro station opened for service on 5 January 2012. It is a transfer station with the Taoyuan Airport MRT, which opened on 2 March 2017.

== Station overview ==
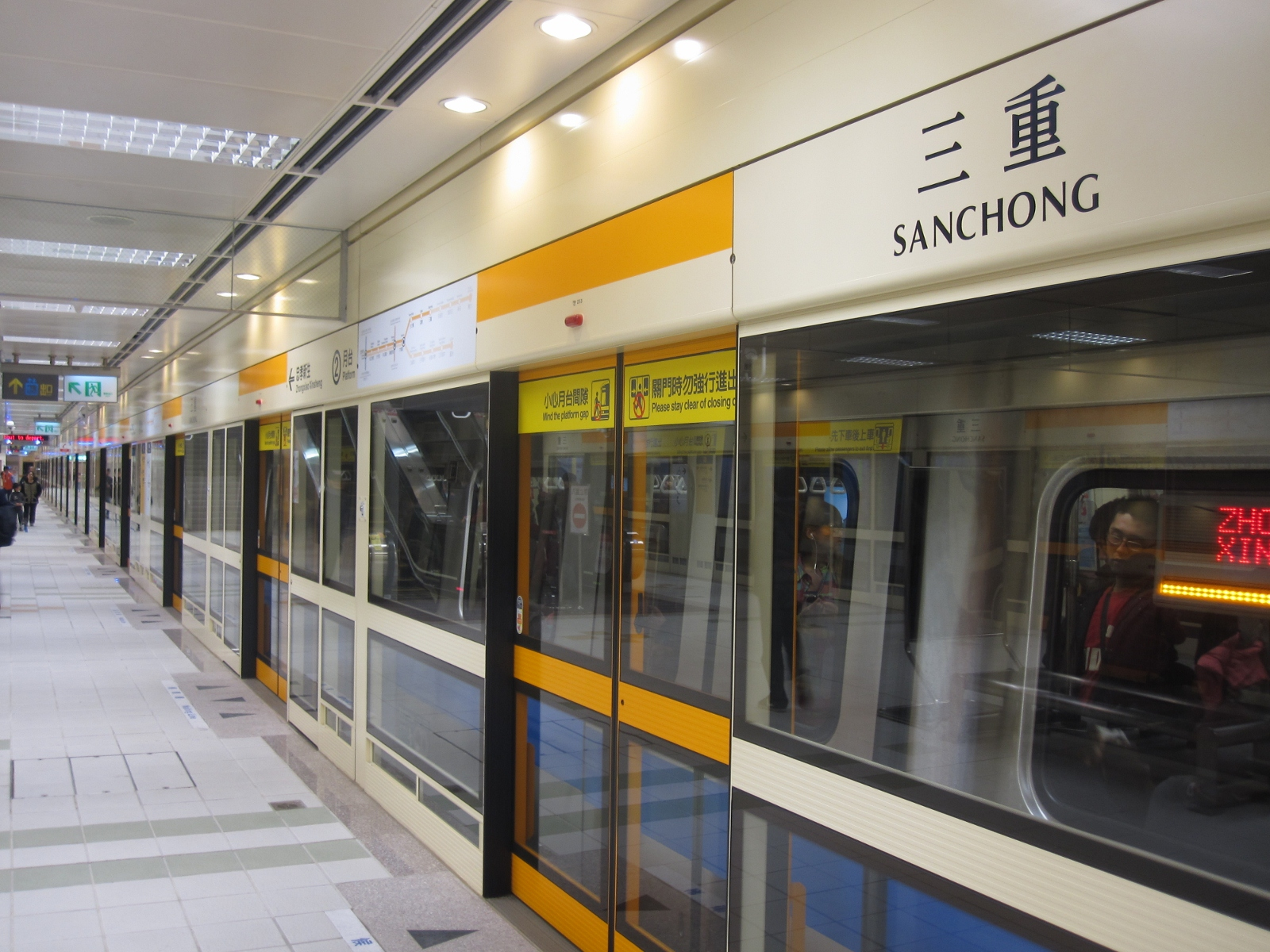
Orange Line platform

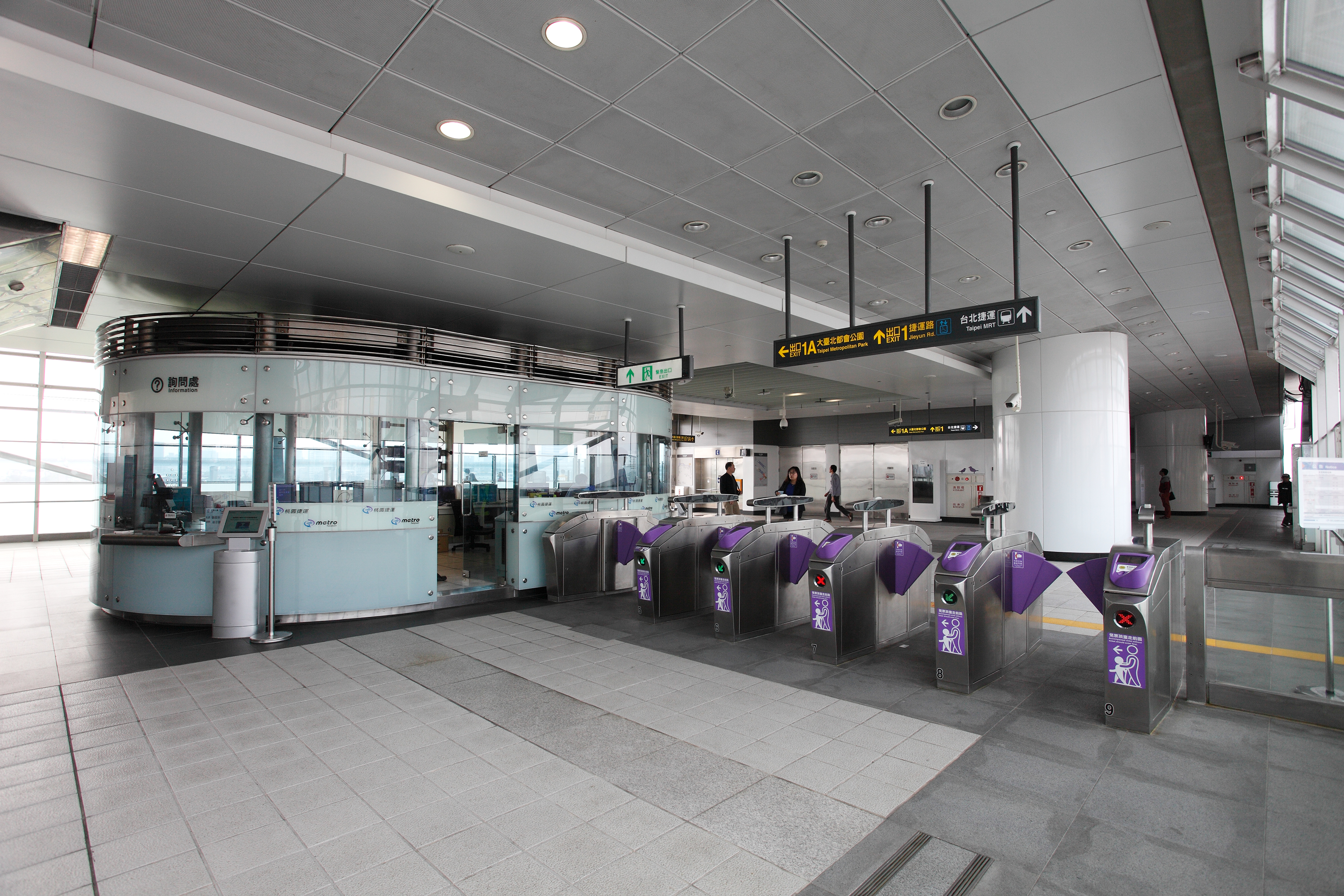
Station faregates

The Orange Line section is a four-level, underground station has an island platform. It is located beneath Jieyun Rd., Lane 3 and Shuhong East Rd, near the Erchong flood diversion channel. It was scheduled to open in March 2012 along with most of the Xinzhuang Line, but opened for service earlier on 5 January 2012.

Sanchong station is a transfer station with the Taoyuan Airport MRT, which is a four-level, elevated station with an island platform.

=== Construction ===
Excavation depth for the Zhonghe-Xinlu station is 19.2 m (63 ft 0 in). It is 221.4 m (726 ft 5 in) in length and 21.55 m (70 ft 8 in) wide. It has three entrances, one accessibility elevator, and three vent shafts. Two of the entrances are located next to a joint development lot. An 8,000 m^{2} (86,111 ft^{2}) plot of land beside the station is being set aside for joint development projects. The entrance features a double arch-shaped glass roof.

The Taoyuan Airport MRT station features three more elevators and one more exit, exit 1A.

=== Design ===
The Zhonghe-Xinlu station design is based on a theme of "Waterfront Green Land" with walls and floors inlaid with various materials to form patterns, such as rushing water. The Taoyuan Airport MRT features an installation art named "conveyor belt of dreams and memories", located on the platform level.

== Station layout ==
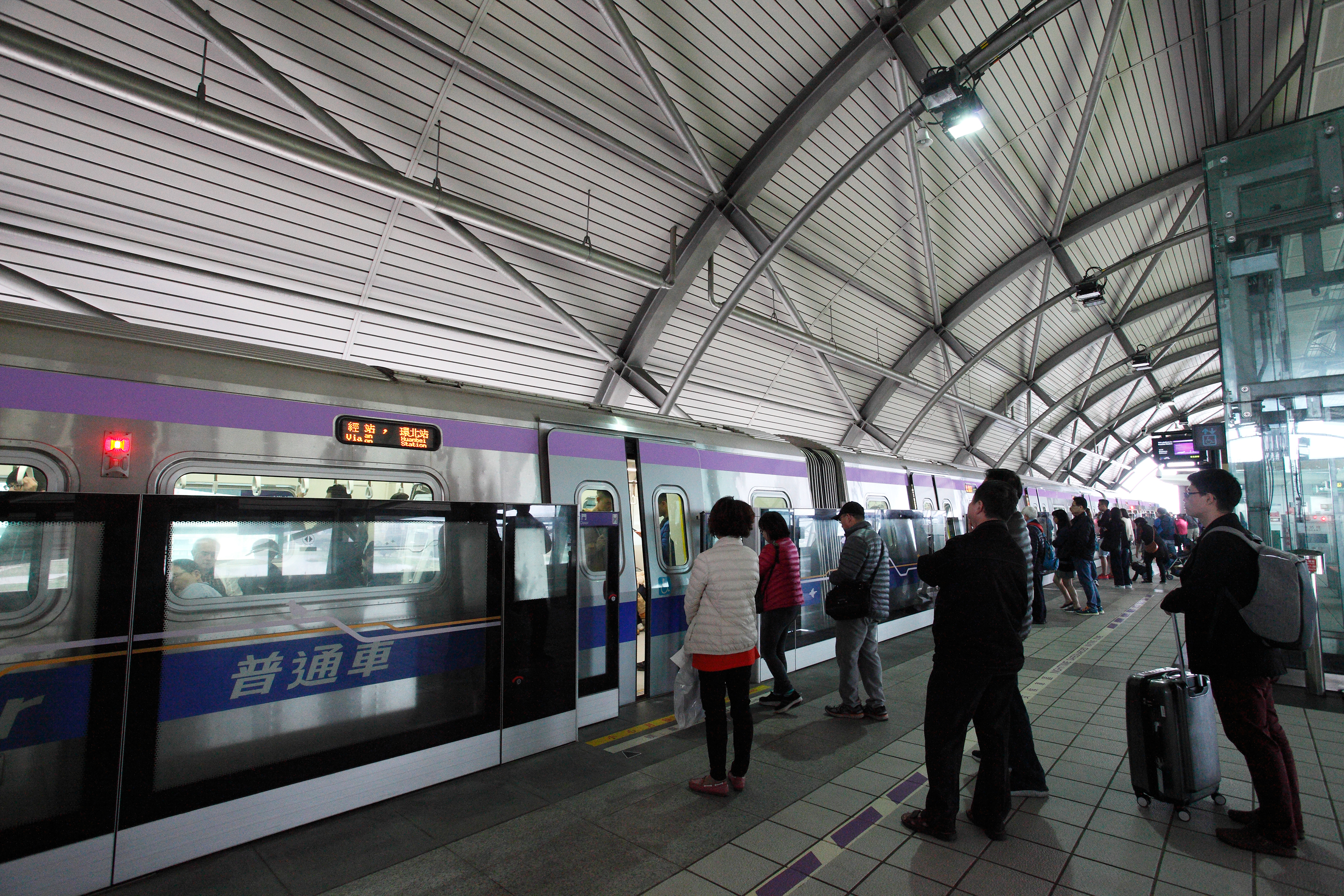
Airport MRT commuter train arriving at station

| 4F | Platform 1 | ← Airport MRT Commuter toward Laojie River (New Taipei Industrial Park) ← Airport MRT Express does not stop here |
| 4F | Island platform, doors will open on the left |
| 4F | Platform 2 | Airport MRT Commuter toward Taipei (terminus) → Airport MRT Express does not stop here → |
| 2F | Lobby | Station lobby, information counter, automatic ticket machines, faregates |
| Street level | Entrance/exit | Entrance/exit |
| B3 | Concourse | Lobby, information desk, automatic ticket dispensing machines, one-way faregates |
| B3 | Concourse | Restrooms (inside fare zone, outside fare zone near exit 1) |
| B4 | Platform 1 | ← Zhonghe–Xinlu line toward Huilong (O16 Xianse Temple) |
| B4 | Island platform, doors will open on the left |
| B4 | Platform 2 | → Zhonghe–Xinlu line toward Nanshijiao (O14 Cailiao) → |

=== Exits ===
- Exit 1: No. 36, Jieyun Rd., near Shuhong E. Rd.
- Exit 1A: In the middle of the cross-levee bridge next to the station, New Taipei Metropolitan Park
- Exit 2: Jieyun Rd. (near Lane 22)
- Exit 3: Jieyun Rd. (near Lane 19)

== Around the station ==
- Erchong Floodway
  - Erchong Floodway Park
- Jimei Elementary School
- Sanchong High School
- New Taipei Bridge
- Chongxin Bridge
- Zhongxing Bridge
- New Taipei Metropolitan Park
