= Guandu Bridge =

Guandu Bridge 關渡大橋
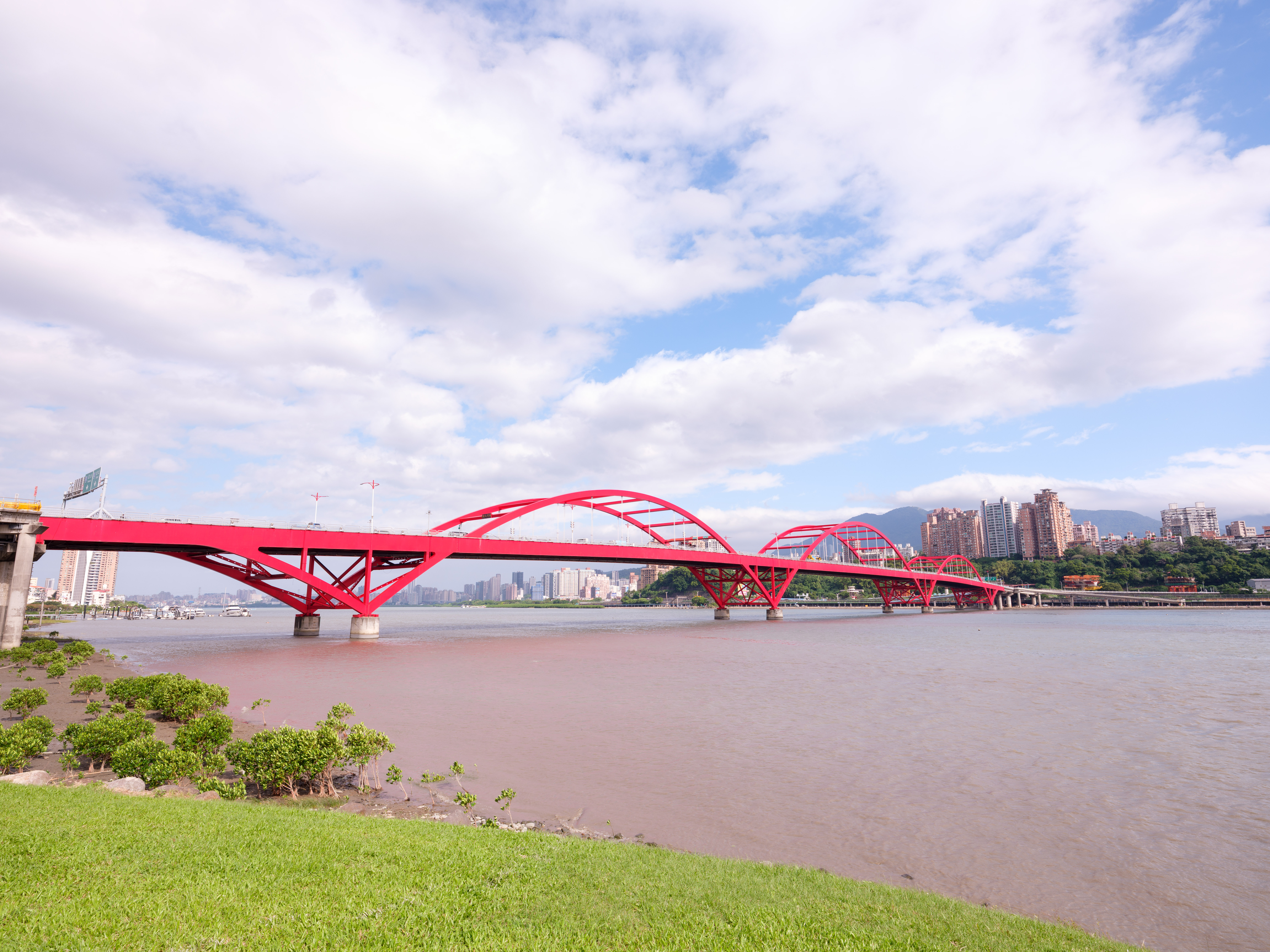
- Coordinates: 25°07′32″N 121°27′26″E
- Carries: Provincial Highway 15
- Crosses: Tamsui River
- Locale: New Taipei, Taiwan

Characteristics
- Design: Arch bridge
- Total length: 809 metres (2,654 ft)
- Width: 19 metres (62 ft)
- Height: 87.8 metres (288 ft)
- No. of spans: 5
- Piers in water: 4

History
- Designer: Tung-Yen Lin
- Construction start: April 1980
- Construction end: October 1983
- Opened: 31 October 1983

Location
- Interactive map of Guandu Bridge

The Guandu Bridge (Chinese: 關渡大橋; pinyin: Guāndù Dàqiáo; Pe̍h-ōe-jī: Koan To Toa Kio) is a 165-meter through arch bridge in New Taipei, Taiwan, designed by Tung-Yen Lin. It spans the Tamsui River, Taiwan's third-longest river, connecting the Bali District and Tamsui District via Provincial Highway 15. It is located approximately 6 kilometers from the mouth of the Tamsui River.

== History ==
Bridge construction started in April 1980 and was completed on 31 October 1983.

== Transportation ==
The bridge is accessible within walking distance west of Guandu Station of Taipei Metro.

== See also ==
- List of bridges in Taiwan
- Transportation in Taiwan
- Danjiang Bridge
