= Xianse Temple metro station =

Metro station in New Taipei, Taiwan

Xianse Temple 先嗇宮
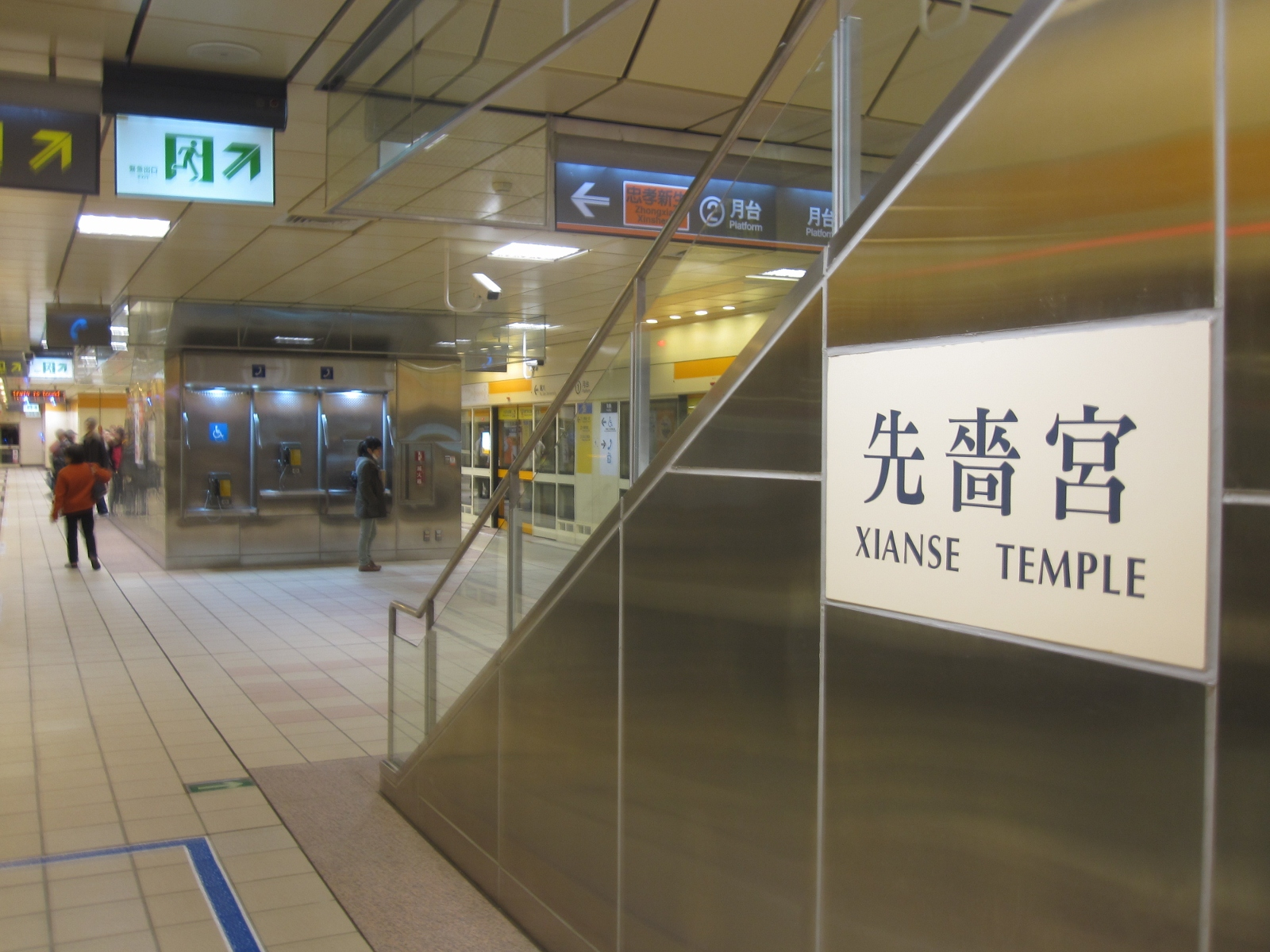
- Xianse Temple platform level

Chinese name
- Traditional Chinese: 先嗇宮
- Simplified Chinese: 先啬宫
Transcriptions
Standard Mandarin
- Hanyu Pinyin: Xiānsè Gōng
- Bopomofo: ㄒㄧㄢ ㄙㄜˋㄍㄨㄥ
- Wade–Giles: Hsien¹-sê⁴ Kung¹
Hakka
- Pha̍k-fa-sṳ: Siên-sit Kiûng
Southern Min
- Tâi-lô: Sian-sik-kiong

General information
- Location: B1, No. 515, Sec. 5, Chongxin Rd. Sanchong, New Taipei; Taiwan
- Coordinates: 25.0464°N 121.4717°E
- Operator: Taipei Metro
- Line: Zhonghe–Xinlu Line (O16)
- Connections: Bus stop

Construction
- Structure type: Underground

Other information
- Station code: O16

History
- Opened: 5 January 2012

Passengers
- 9,931 daily (December 2024)
- Rank: 103 out of 109

Services
Preceding station	Taipei Metro	Following station
Sanchong towards Nanshijiao	Zhonghe–Xinlu line	Touqianzhuang towards Huilong
Location

.

The Taipei Metro Xianse Temple station is a station on the Zhonghe–Xinlu line located in Sanchong District, New Taipei, Taiwan. The station opened for service on 5 January 2012.

== Station overview ==
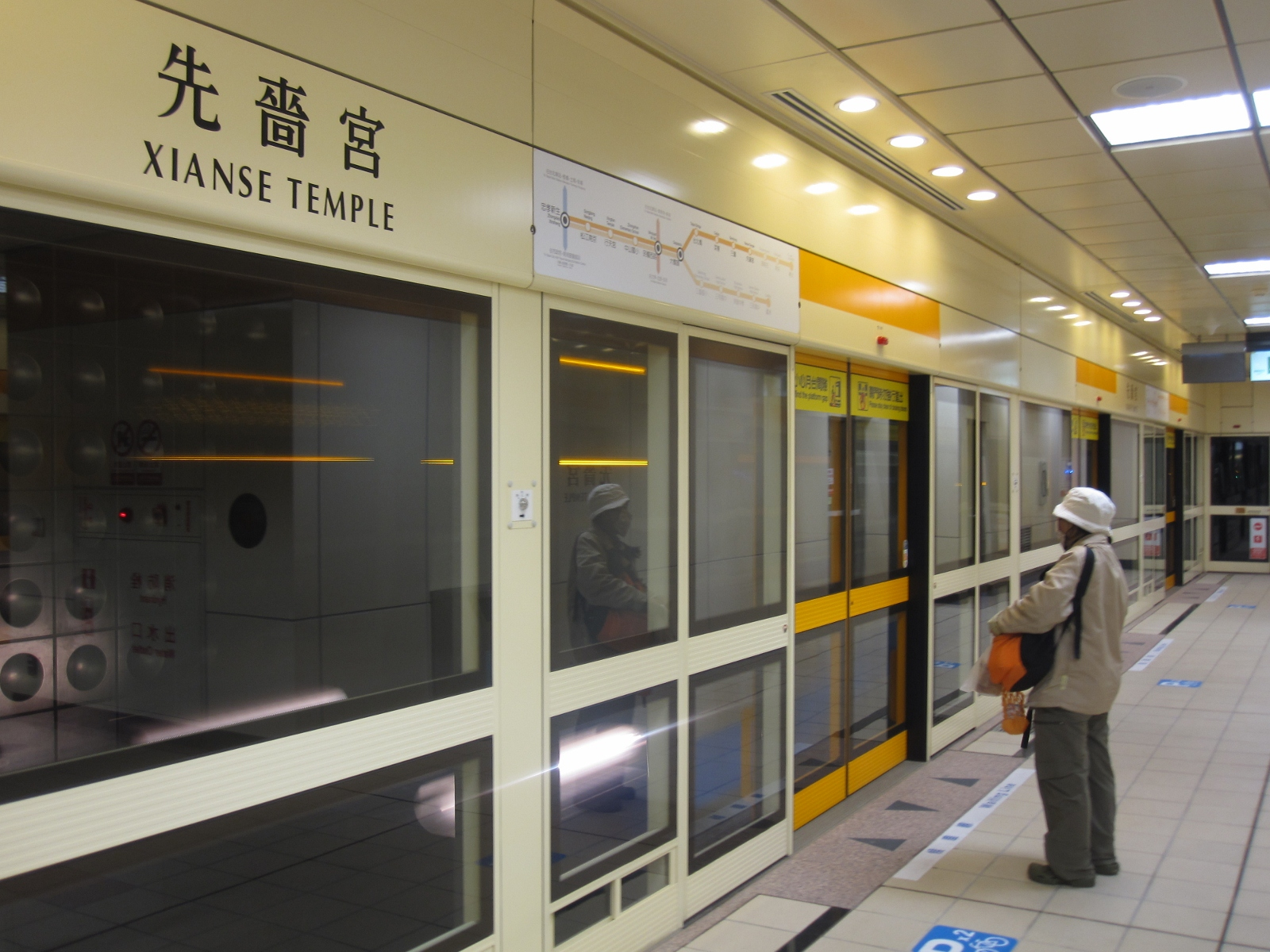
Xianse Temple station platform

This two-level, underground station has an island platform. It is located beneath the intersection of Zhongxin Rd., Sec. 5 and Guangfu Rd., Sec. 1. It was scheduled to open in March 2012 along with most of the Xinzhuang Line, but opened for service earlier, on 5 January 2012.

=== Construction ===
Excavation depth for this station is 18.93 to 21.23 m (62.1 to 69.7 ft). It is 180 m (590 ft) in length and 16.55 m (54.3 ft) wide. The platform is 141 m (463 ft) long. It has three entrances, one accessibility elevator, and two vent shafts. One of the entrances is integrated with a joint development building.

=== Design ===
The theme for the station is "Steel Industry on the Sandbank" and includes features such as a perforated steel frame station entrance. The roof is separated into two parts and a glass curtain wall which helps with lighting at night.

== Station layout ==
Street level	Entrance/exit	Entrance/exit
B1	Concourse	Lobby, information desk, automatic ticket dispensing machines, one-way faregates
B1	Concourse	Restrooms (inside fare zone, outside fare zone near exit 2)
B2	Platform 1	← Zhonghe–Xinlu line toward Huilong (O17 Touqianzhuang)
B2	Island platform, doors will open on the left
B2	Platform 2	→ Zhonghe–Xinlu line toward Nanshijiao (O15 Sanchong) →

=== Exits ===
- Exit 1: No. 155, Chongxin Rd. Sec. 5, near Guangfu Rd. Sec. 1
- Exit 2: Chongxin Rd. Sec. 5, near Zhongxing S. St.
- Exit 3: Chongxin Rd. Sec. 5, near Guangfu Rd. Sec. 1

== Around the station ==
- Xianse Temple
- Tangcheng Industrial Park
- Carrefour, Chongxin Store
- Xinggu Elementary School
- Jinling Girls School
- Qingchuan Home Store
