= Tamsui River =

River in northern Taiwan

Coordinates: 25°10′30″N 121°24′30″E

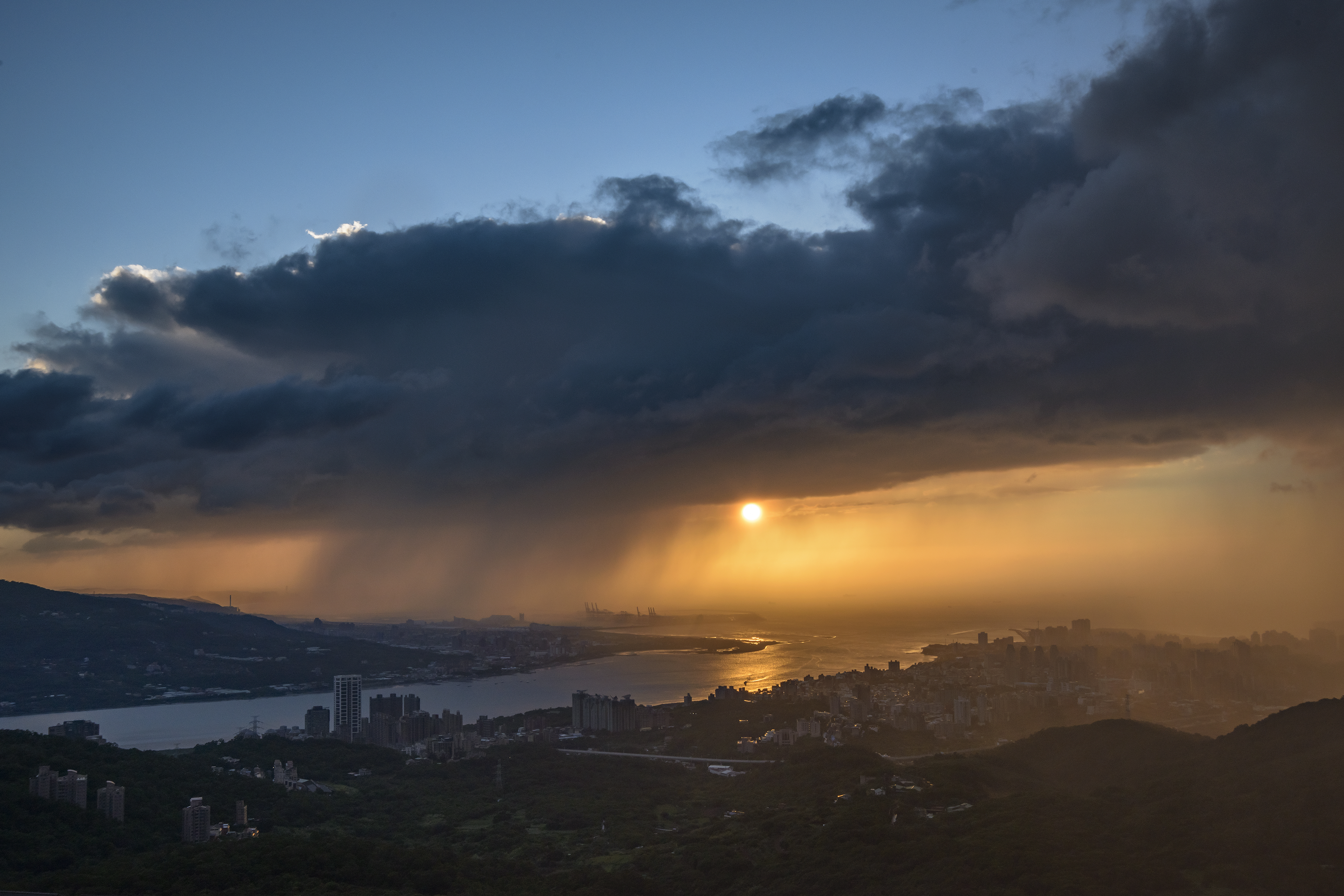
- The mouth of Tamsui River
- Native name: 淡水河 (Chinese)

Location
- Country: Taiwan

Physical characteristics
- Source
  - location: Pintian Mountain
  - elevation: 3,529 metres (11,578 ft)
- Mouth
  - location: Taiwan Strait
  - elevation: 0 metres (0 ft)
- Length: 158.7 km (98.6 mi)
- Basin size: 2,726 km^{2} (1,053 sq mi)
- Discharge
  - average: 210 cubic metres per second (7,400 cu ft/s)
  - maximum: 13,600 m^{3}/s (480,000 cu ft/s)

Tamsui River
- Chinese: 淡水河
- Literal meaning: Freshwater River
Transcriptions
Standard Mandarin
- Hanyu Pinyin: Dànshǔi Hé
- Wade–Giles: Tan^{4}-shui^{3} Ho^{2}
Southern Min
- Hokkien POJ: Tām-chúi-hô

The Tamsui River (alternatively Danshui River, Chinese: 淡水河; lit. 'freshwater river') is the third longest river in Taiwan after Zhuoshui River and Gaoping River, with a total length of 158.7 km (98.6 mi), flowing through Hsinchu County, Taoyuan, Taipei and New Taipei City. It is located in the northern part of the island.

== Geography ==
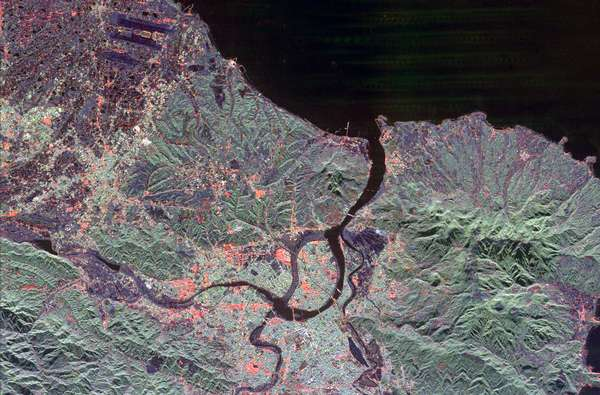
Satellite image of the Tamsui River mouth

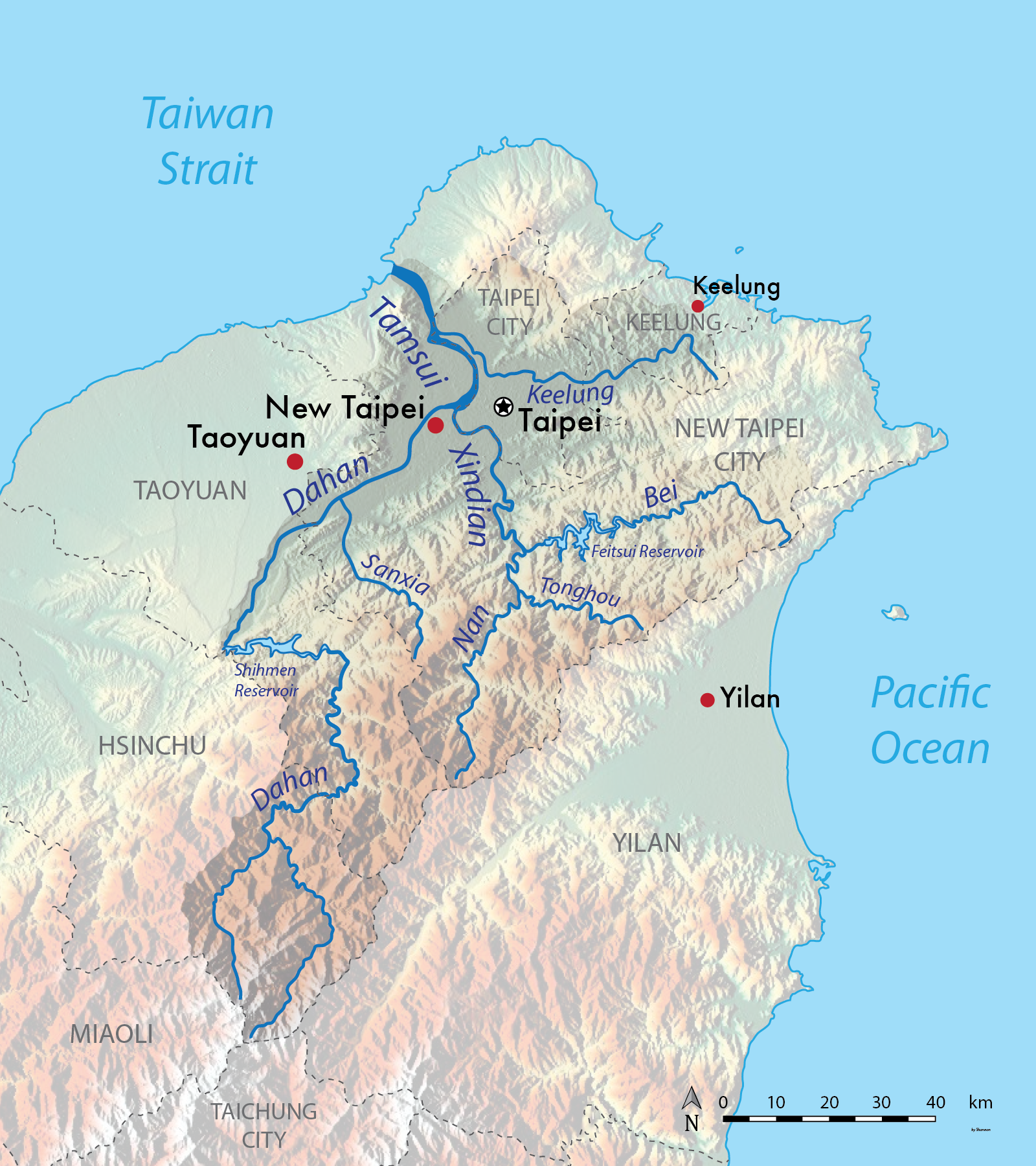
Map of the Tamsui River watershed

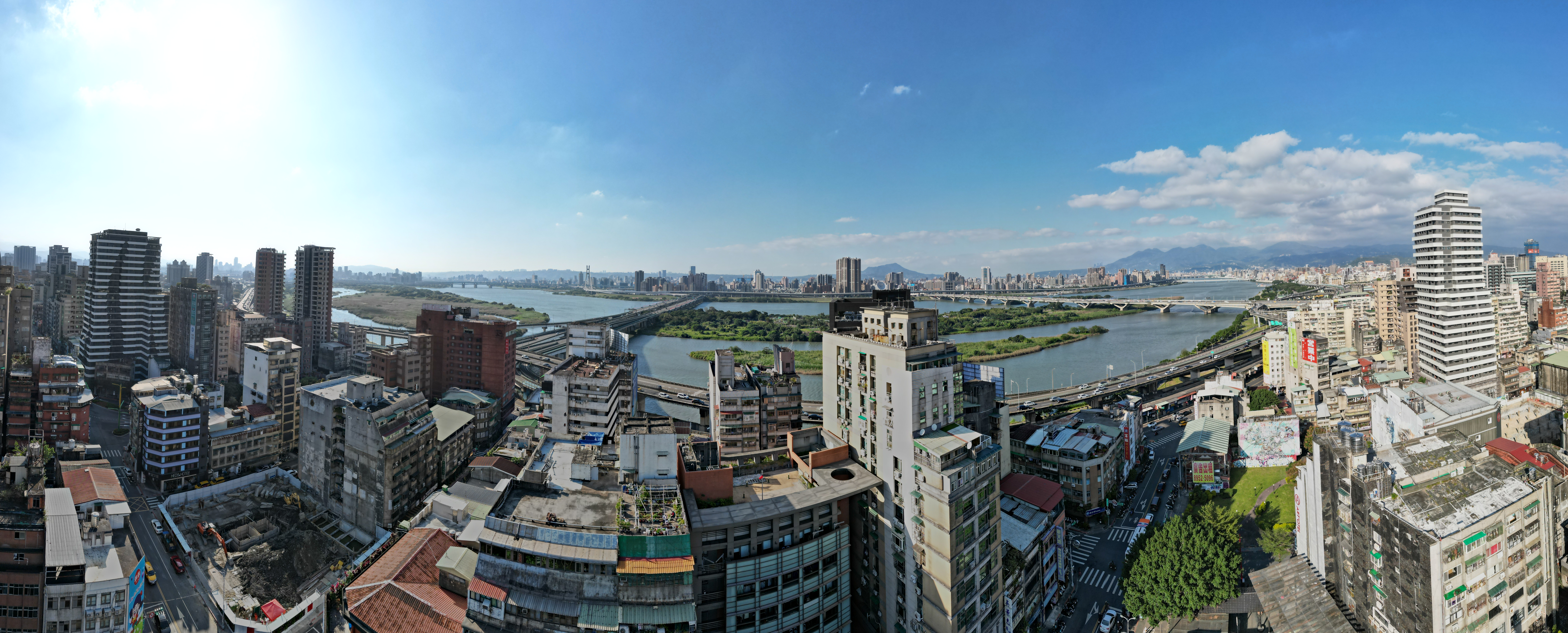
Aerial panorama of Taipei city facing the Tamsui River.

The Tamsui River begins at the confluence of Xindian River and Dahan River at the western boundary of Taipei and New Taipei City, just north of Banqiao District, and flows northward and northwestward, passing the eponymous Tamsui District, then emptying into the Taiwan Strait.

The river's three tributaries are the Xindian River, Dahan River and Keelung River. The Dahan River is the main tributary and has its headwaters in the Pintian Mountain in Hsinchu County and flows through Hsinchu County, Taoyuan City and New Taipei City. As a river system including the Dahan River, the Tamsui River has a total length of 159 km (99 mi) and a drainage area of 2,726 km^{2} (1,053 mi^{2}).

A major artificial distributary on the left bank of the Tamsui, the Erchong Floodway, was completed in 1984 as part of a flood control scheme for the Taipei Basin. The flood control plan for Greater Taipei dated back to 1959, and by 1987, dykes had been built along the banks of the Tamsui.

== Pollution ==
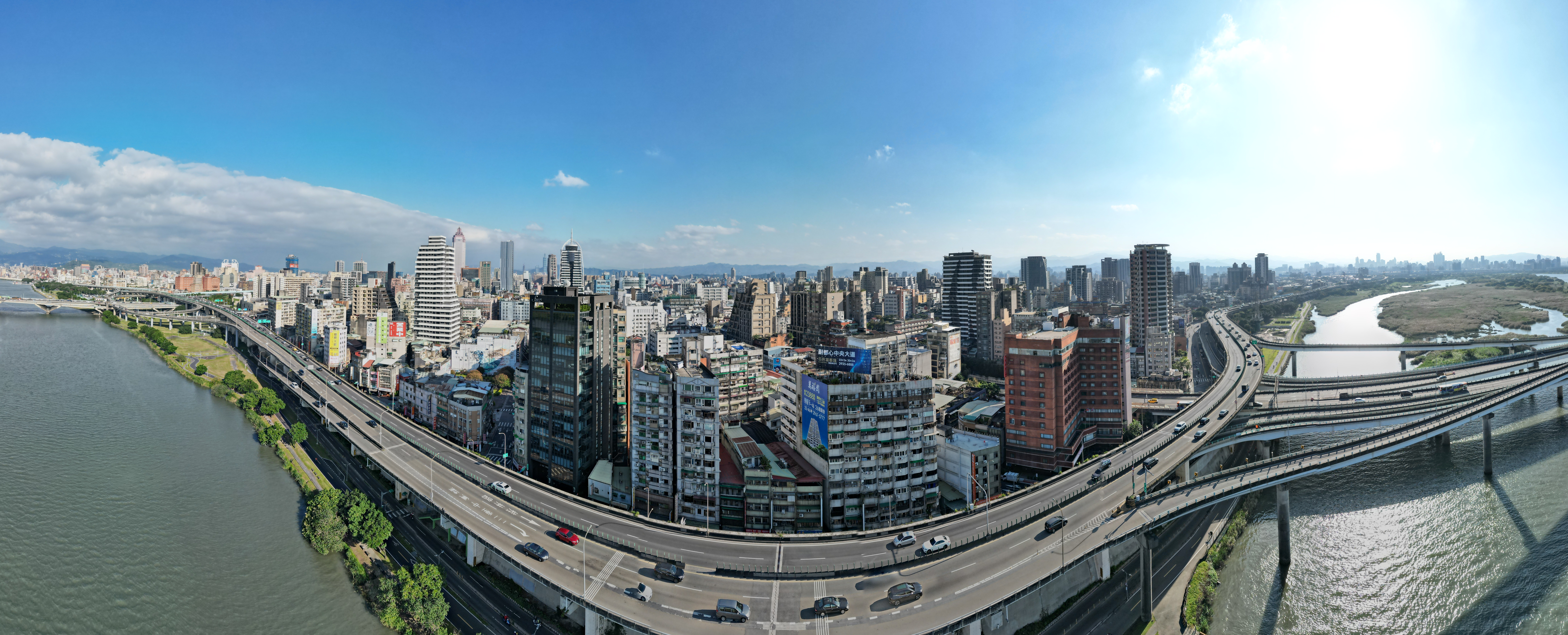
Aerial panorama of Taipei's west from the perspective of Tamsui River.

The Tamsui River is heavily polluted by both raw sewage and industrial pollution from illegal industry. Clean up and natural river restoration is on the agenda of the Taipei City Government, Executive Yuan and several citizen organizations. Through the 1970s, the river was clean and could support ship traffic and fishing. By the 1980s, the Tamsui was polluted and was dominated by tilapia. Governmental efforts to clean up the Tamsui include "The Recovery Project of the Tamsui River Watershed Area" implemented in 1987 by the Environmental Protection Administration, at the time a division of the Department of Health. This effort was finally undertaken as a result of massive public pressure. The first goal set was to have the river no longer smell in the summer. Water quality improved significantly; however, efforts to improve water quality were hampered by the numerous residences whose sewage emptied directly into the river. Cleanup efforts continue to the present day, and include linking the watershed's residents to a shared sewer system.

== Fauna ==
Scientists conducting research on what they believed to be Meretrix lusoria in the Tamsui River sent samples for genetic analysis and discovered that they were a distinct species: Meretrix taiwanica.

== In popular culture ==
Due to the river's pollution, “I’d rather jump into the Tamsui River!” was once a popular phrase in Taipei.

== Bridges ==
Several famous bridges run across the river, from south to north downstream:

- Zhongxing Bridge
- Zhongxiao Bridge
- Taipei Bridge
- Danshui River Bridge (Note: For images, see Danshui River Bridge.)
- Chongyang Bridge
- Guandu Bridge
- Danjiang Bridge
- Tamsui Lover's Bridge (incomplete crossing within Tamsui only)

== See also ==
- List of rivers in Taiwan
