= Erchong Floodway =

River in Taiwan

Coordinates: 25°4′11″N 121°27′43″E

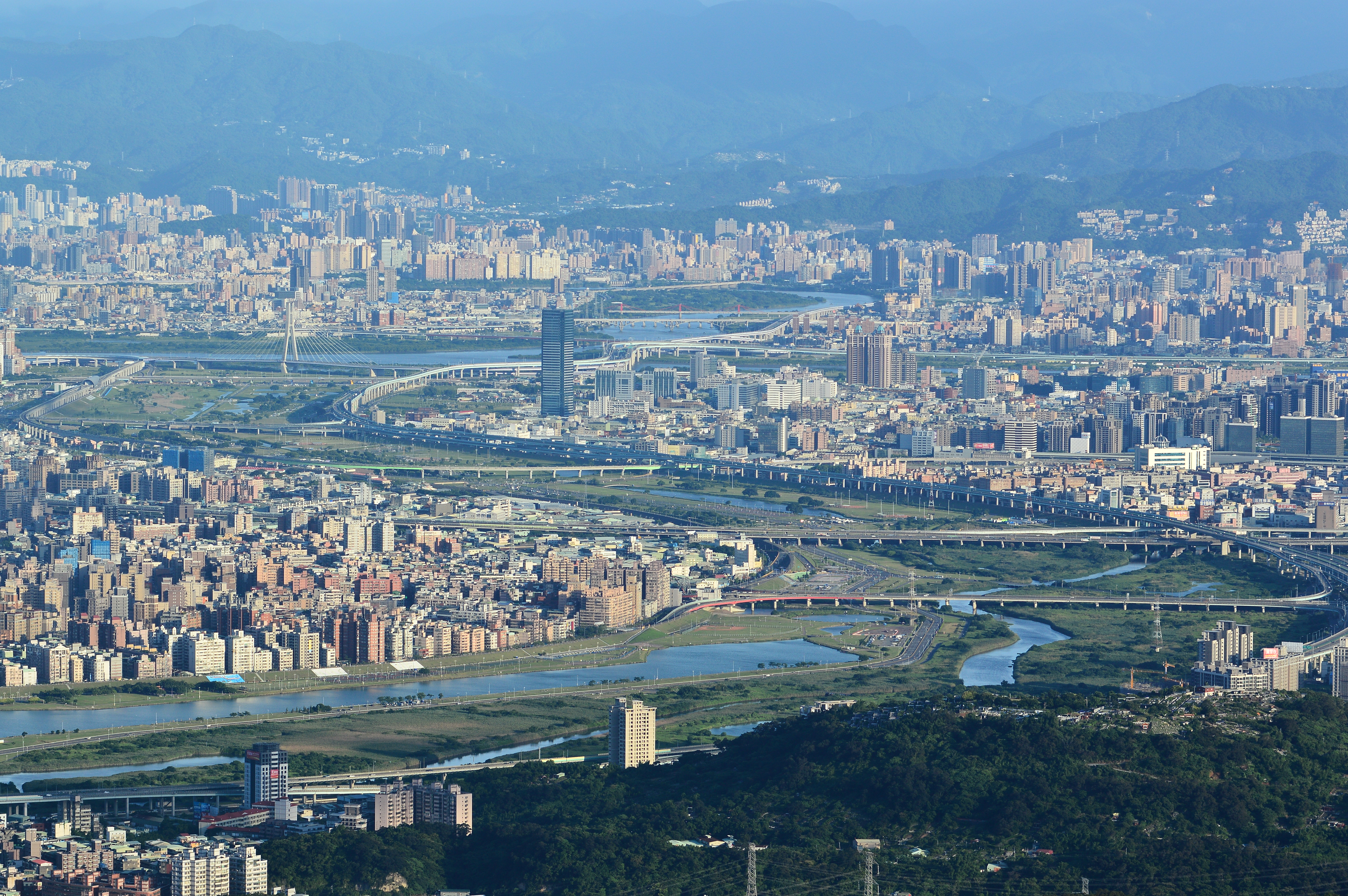
View of the Erchong Floodway looking upstream (southeast) to the confluence of the Dahan, Xindian and Tamsui Rivers.

The Erchong Floodway (Chinese: 二重疏洪道) is a major flood control channel of the Tamsui River in New Taipei, Taiwan.

== Description ==
The Erchong Floodway is approximately 7.7 km (4.8 mi) long and between 450 m (1,480 ft) and 700 m (2,300 ft) wide covering an area of about 424 ha (1,050 acres) in the centre of the Taipei metropolitan area. Located on the left bank of the Tamsui River in New Taipei, the floodway passes through the districts of Sanchong, Xinzhuang, Wugu, and Luzhou. Generally following the path of smaller natural tributaries of the Tamsui, the Erchong Floodway is separated by as much as 3.5 km (2.2 mi) from the main course of the Tamsui.

In addition to its importance in flood control measures, the Erchong Floodway provides significant recreation and conservation functions. A network of urban parks, trails, greenspace, and leisure facilities within the floodway includes the New Taipei Metropolitan Park, Shuhongzhuifeng Park, and Shuhong Ecological Park among others. Wugu Wetland, at the mouth of the floodway on the Tamsui River opposite the mouth the Keelung River, is an important ecological wetland for bird species within the greater Taipei area.

== History ==
The Taipei Basin is historically prone to flooding being located in a humid subtropical climate that can often experience catastrophic typhoons. A number of rivers enter the Taipei Basin, including the Dahan, Xindian, and Keelung, that converge to form the Tamsui River. The Tamsui acts as the sole hydrological outlet of the basin as it drains freshwater north to the Taiwan Strait, but the river is at a low elevation near sea level and is therefore subject to reverse saltwater flow at high tides several times a month.

After Typhoon Gloria caused significant flooding in Taipei in 1963, the Taiwan government carried out an engineering project to widen the Tamsui River at its narrowest point at Lion's Head Rock, near the present-day Guandu Bridge. The effect of this project was counter-productive as the Tamsui River was exposed to more flooding from ocean high tides.

The idea of a freshwater floodway was first proposed in 1973 as part of Taipei District Flood Control Plan Proposal, but construction did not commence until 1979. The first phase was completed in 1984, creating an alternate freshwater channel for the Tamsui River on its left bank at times of high water level. The village of Zhouzaiwei was relocated to what is now Luzhou District as part of the first phase. A second phase, completed in 1987, increased the heights of the embankment dikes to account for 200-year flood levels. A third and final phase of the project was completed in 1996.

== Gallery ==
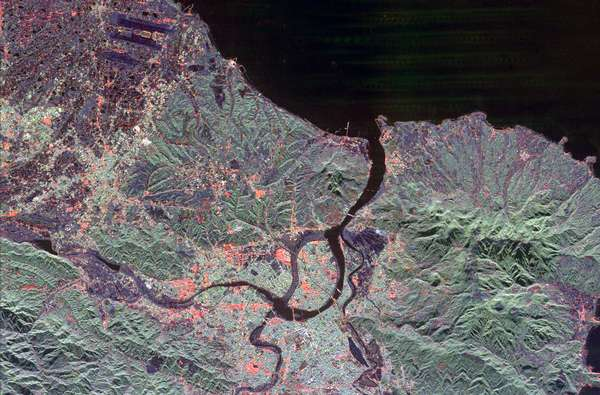
Radar imagery of the Taipei Basin showing the Erchong Floodway as light navy blue in the centre, and the Tamsui River in dark navy blue to the right, completely surrounding Sanchong and Luzhou Districts.

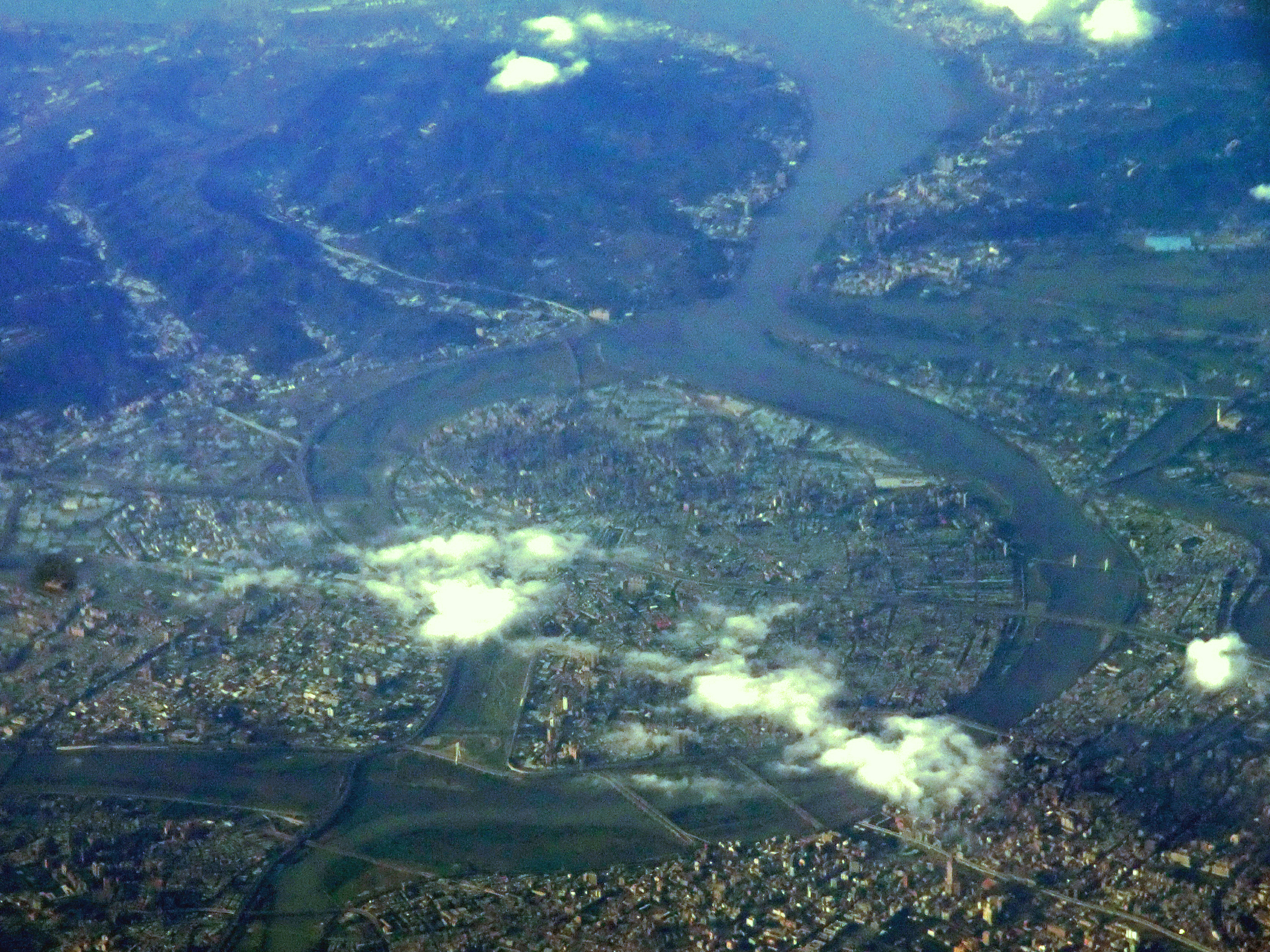
Aerial photo showing the Erchong Floodway on the left and the main course of the Tamsui River on the right. Sanchong and Luzhou Districts are located between the floodway and the Tamsui.

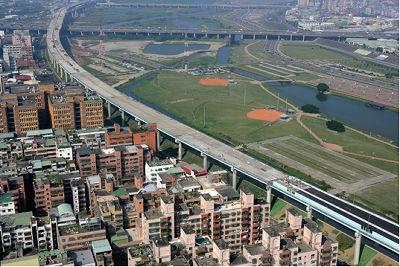
View of Highway 64 running parallel to the Erchong Floodway.

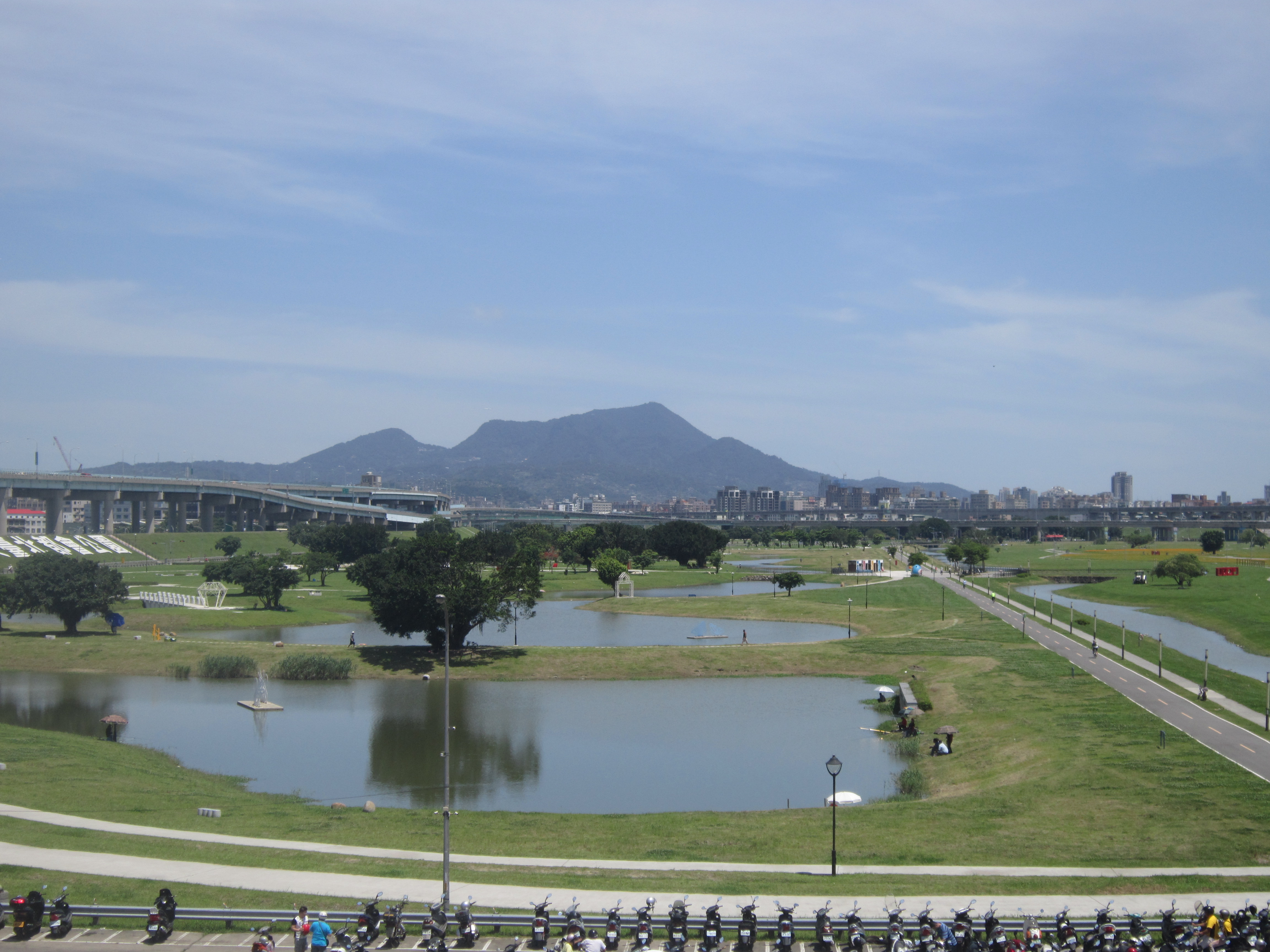
New Taipei Metropolitan Park within the Erchong Floodway.

== See also ==
- New Danube, Austria
- Red River Floodway, Canada
- Jakarta Flood Canal, Indonesia
