= Danjiang Bridge =

Bridge at the estuary of Tamsui River

Danjiang Bridge 淡江大橋
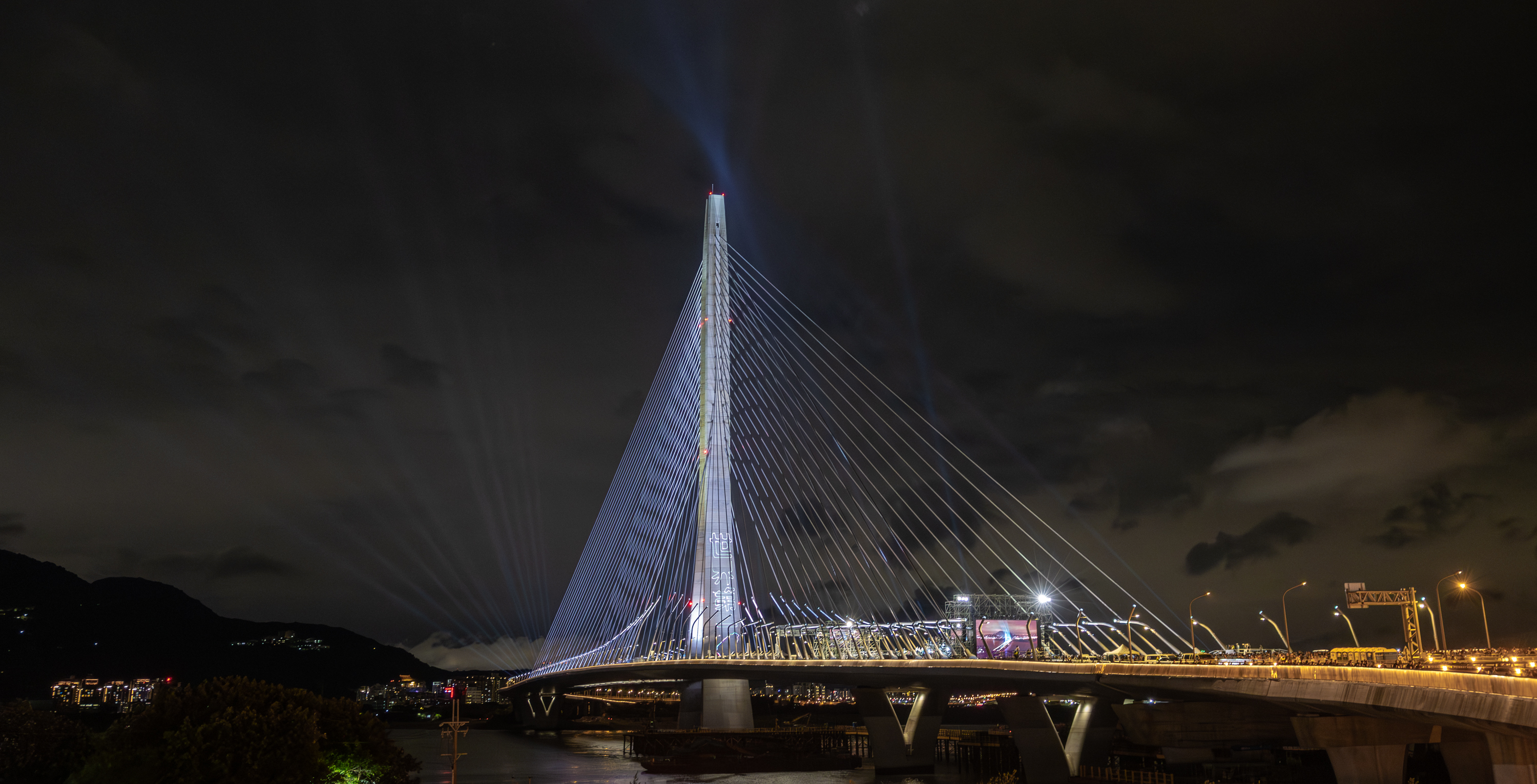
- Danjiang Bridge at night in May 2026
- Coordinates: 25°10′31″N 121°25′4″E
- Carries: Prov 61; Bali light rail (planned)
- Crosses: Tamsui River
- Locale: New Taipei, Taiwan
- Other name: Tamkang Bridge
- Maintained by: Highway Bureau

Characteristics
- Design: Single-tower, asymmetric, cable-stayed bridge
- Material: Concrete, Steel
- Total length: 920 metres (3,020 ft)
- Width: 71 m (233 ft)
- Height: 200 m (660 ft)
- Longest span: 450 m (1,480 ft)
- Clearance below: 20 m (66 ft)

History
- Architect: ZHA Architects
- Engineering design by: Sinotech Engineering Consultants, Leonhardt Andra und Partner Beratende Ingenieure
- Construction start: October 17, 2014
- Opened: May 12, 2026

Location
- Interactive map of Danjiang Bridge

The Danjiang Bridge (Chinese: 淡江大橋; pinyin: Dànjiāng Dàqiáo; Tâi-lô: Tām-kang Tuā-kiô) is a road bridge spanning the mouth of the Tamsui River, which links Bali and Tamsui in New Taipei City, Taiwan.

The bridge was designed by architect ZHA Architects. It is a single-tower asymmetric cable-stayed bridge with a 920 metres (3,020 ft) long road, rail and pedestrian deck supported by a single 200 m (660 ft)-tall pylon.

== History ==
The bridge was commissioned by the Highway Bureau, and was designed to provide connection to the national highway system and to ease congestion on the Guandu Bridge that is situated further upstream. The construction of the bridge will also facilitate the expansion of the Danhai Light Rail, part of the city's light rail public transport system. In 2015, Zaha Hadid Architects, in collaboration with Leonhardt, Andrä & Partner and Sinotech Engineering Consultants, won the international competition to design the Danjiang Bridge.

== See also ==
- List of bridges in Taiwan
- Transportation in Taiwan
