= Xiansè Temple =

Xianse Temple
- 先嗇宮
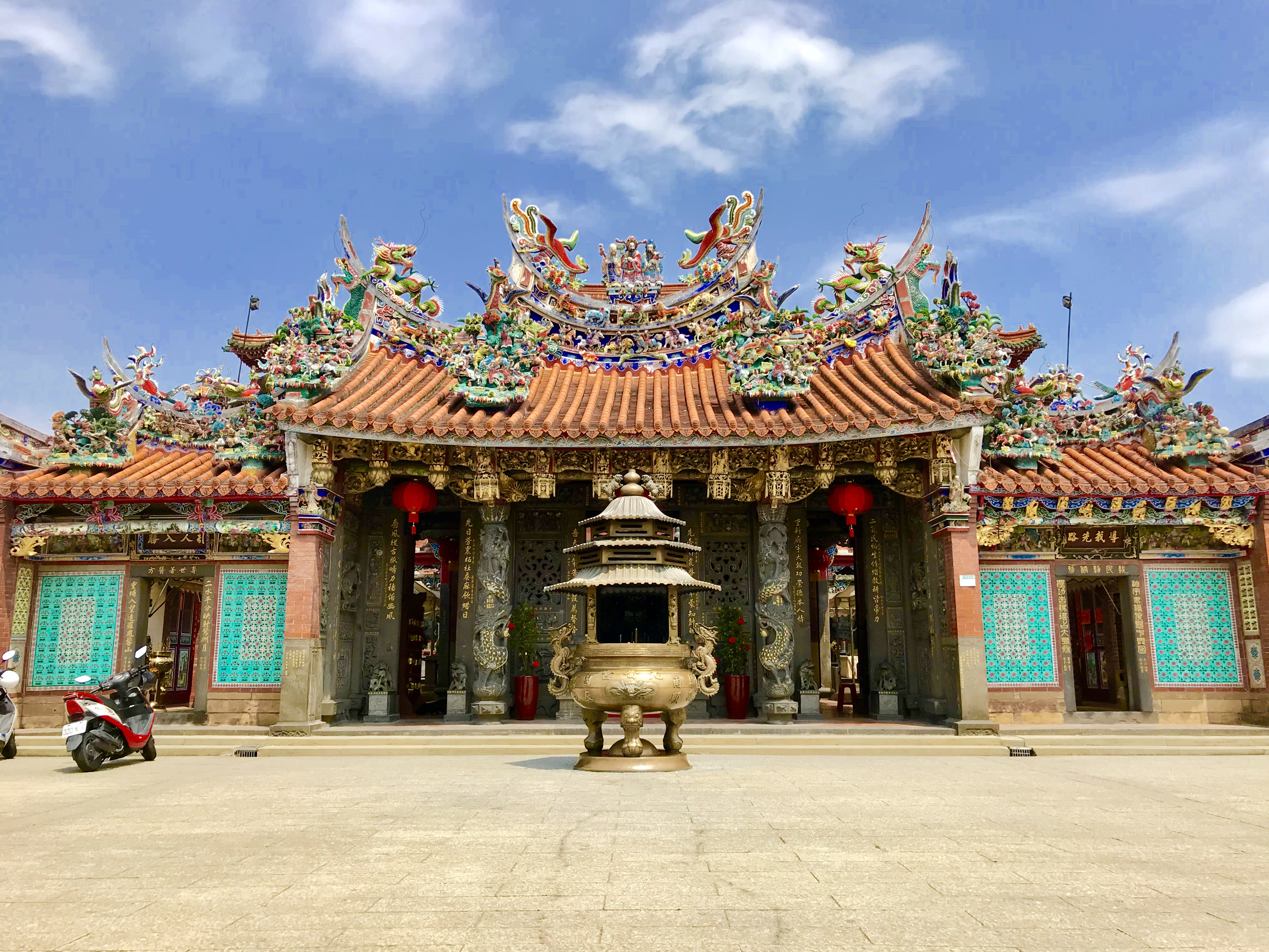
- The facade of Xianse Temple

Religion
- Affiliation: Taiwanese folk religion
- Deity: Shennong the Great Emperor
- Festival: 25th day of the 4th lunar month

Location
- Location: No. 77, Wuguwang North Street, Wugu Village, Sanchong District, New Taipei City, Taiwan
- Interactive map of Xianse Temple
- Coordinates: 25.050496°N 121.475982°E

Architecture
- Established: 1755 (20th year of the Qianlong reign, Qing dynasty)
- Materials: Yingshan roof (Gable roof)
- Historic interior
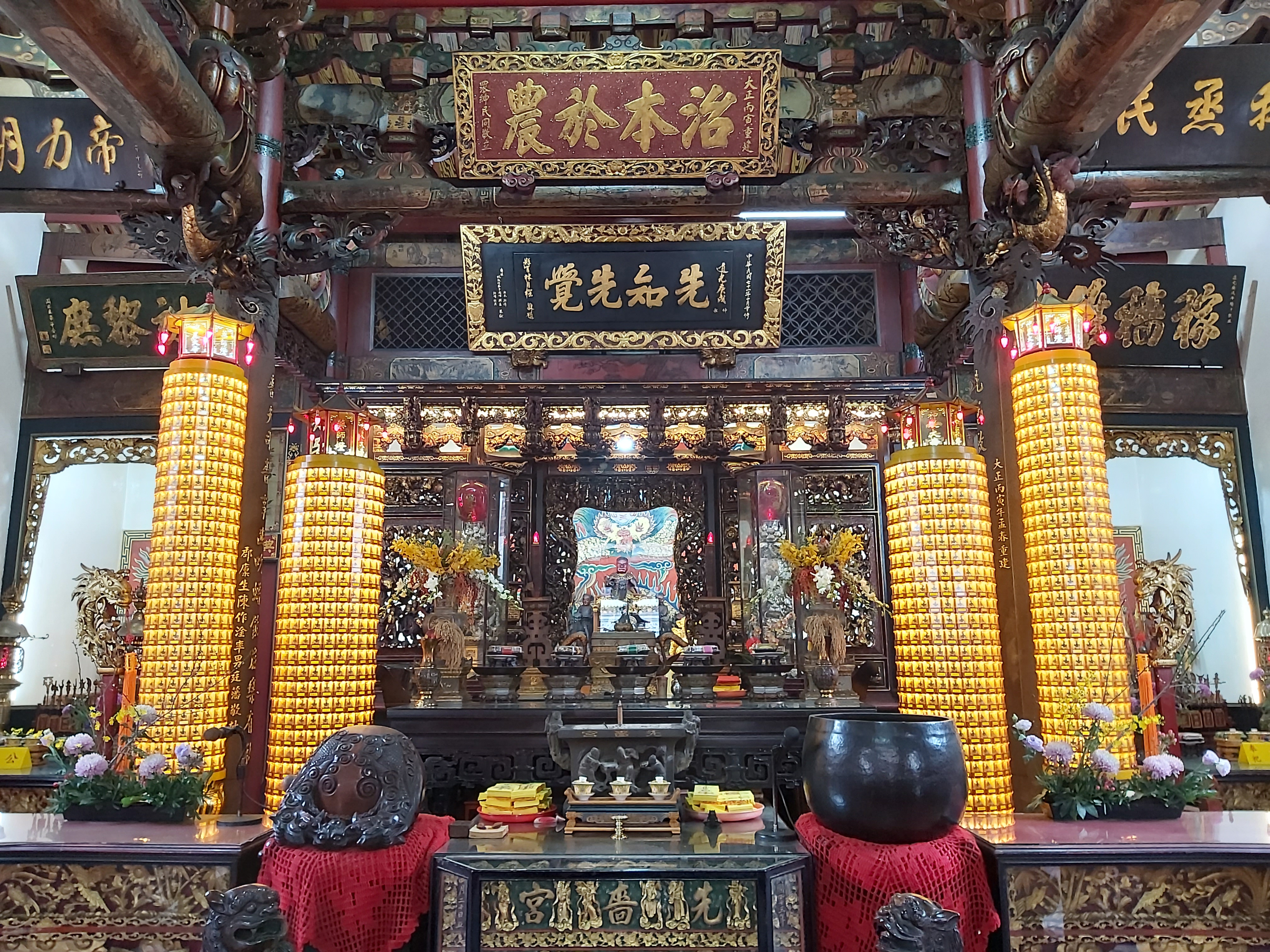
- Interior of the main hall

Xiansè Temple (Chinese: 先嗇宮; Pe̍h-ōe-jī: Sian-sik Kiong), also commonly known as the Wugu King Temple, is a Shennong Temple located in Erchongpu, Wugu Village, Sanchong District, New Taipei City, Taiwan. The temple building has been designated as a cultural asset of New Taipei City and is noted for possessing the largest floral tile wall in northern Taiwan. Its ritual sphere also serves as the administrative boundary between Sanchong and Luzhou.The temple is popularly referred to as the Wugu King Temple, and “Wugu King” is likewise used as a local place name.

== History ==
=== Early development ===
In its early history, Erchongpu was a fishing and hunting area used by the Pingpu indigenous Wulaowan community. Later, as Xinzhuang became increasingly crowded, settlers migrated along the northern bank of the Tamsui River. According to their distance from Xinzhuang and the order of land reclamation, the areas of Touzhongpu, Erchongpu, and Sanchongpu were gradually developed.

In the 10th year of the Qianlong reign (1745), settlers bearing the surname Li began reclaiming land in Erchongpu, and residents invited a statue of Shennong the Great Emperor from Fujian for worship.At the time, the settlers depended on farming fields along sandbanks, and thus venerated this agricultural deity.

On the 11th day of the first lunar month of the 20th year of the Qianlong reign (1755), the temple was constructed at Sankandian, near the present-day boundary of Xinzhuang District along the Dahan River, approximately behind what is now Jinling Girls’ High School. It was named the Temple of the First Emperor of the Five Grains (Wugu Xiandi Temple), also known as the Wugu King Temple. Due to repeated flooding from the Dahan River, the temple was later relocated to Wugu King Village.

In the 30th year of the Daoguang reign (1850), local gentry member Lin Maosheng proposed a reconstruction, expanding the temple into a two-hall structure.The reconstruction was funded by the Lin Benyuan family, Lin Shuncheng, and others, whose names were engraved on the reconstruction stele and wooden carved poetic plaques.

=== Japanese rule period ===
During the Japanese colonial period, the temple was renamed Xiansè Temple. The name “Xiansè” is derived from one of the Eight Wax Deities, an agricultural deity ranked first among them—namely Shennong.

In the 14th year of the Taishō era (1925), Lin Qingdun invited local community leaders and gentry—including Li Zhongyu, Li Shengyuan, Huang Lunyü, Cai Yong, and Zheng Genmu—to jointly raise funds for another reconstruction.

=== Post-war period ===
After World War II, the temple address was No. 77, Wugu King North Street, located in Wugu Village. Repair work was completed on December 6, 1954.In 1972, local devotees raised funds to renovate parts of the roof.

In October 1976, construction began on a new structure consisting of one underground level and three above-ground floors, each covering approximately 90 ping, at a total cost exceeding NT$5 million. Of this amount, NT$3.7 million was advanced by the temple chairman Lian Qingchuan. However, because the site was located within a floodplain control zone, the construction was deemed illegal and was reported by police and ordered demolished.In 1982, a rear hall was added.

=== Modern restoration ===
Due to long-term deterioration and structural damage, a groundbreaking ceremony for restoration scaffolding was held on November 12, 2001, presided over by Yu Hongcun, Secretary of the Cultural Affairs Bureau, and Li Qianlong, Chairman of the temple board, among others.

Comprehensive restoration commenced in February 2004.The project was planned and supervised by Fu Hongren Architects, with construction undertaken by Qingyang Construction Co., Ltd. at a cost exceeding NT$30 million. Approximately 95% of the cut-and-paste ceramic ornamentation was replaced, with materials changed from glass fragments to ceramic bowl shards.

On December 29 of the same year, a bicentennial commemorative stele was completed, with the original inscription written by consultant Cao Qiupu.The restoration was completed later that year, and on December 31, a consecration ceremony was held, attended by Kuomintang Chairman Lien Chan, Taipei Mayor Ma Ying-jeou, and Acting Taipei County Magistrate Lin Xiyao.

== Cultural asset status ==
On May 7, 1998, specialists commissioned by the Council for Cultural Affairs to evaluate nationally designated historic monuments—including Yin Changyi, Wang Qizong, Huang Fusan, Zhou Zongxian, Xu Yujian, Lai Zhizhang, and Zhao Gongdu—visited the temple for inspection. The delegation was guided by the temple chairman Li Qianlong, who introduced the stone pillar couplets authored by Lin Xuchu, Zhang Shushen, Chen Weiying, Chen Weijing, Li Zhongyu, and Luo Xiuhui, as well as a statue of Shennong the Great Emperor that was more than two hundred years old.

Later that same year, the temple was officially designated as a third-grade historic monument.

=== Paired-work craftsmanship (duìchǎng zuò) ===
The architectural form of Xiansè Temple is regarded as the most prominent surviving example in Taiwan of duìchǎng zuò (paired-work craftsmanship), a traditional construction method in which two rival artisan groups execute symmetrical portions of a building independently. The temple complex mainly consists of a front hall, main hall, rear hall, and east and west side chambers.

According to Li Qianlong, during the 1925 reconstruction, two artisan factions competed to undertake the project. As a result, the temple authorities decided to allow both groups to carry out the work simultaneously.The tiger side was executed by Chen Yingbin, leading Huang Guili, while the dragon side was constructed by Wu Haitong, leading Wang Kuan.

Differences in craftsmanship can be observed throughout the structure. Above the door couplets on both sides of the main entrance, bat motifs appear, each rendered in a distinctly different style.On the tiger side, the chi-hu window depicts two chi-hu with their tails facing each other, whereas on the dragon side the heads face one another.At the entrance platform, the dragon side features a lion pedestal attached to the wall, while the tiger side employs a clamp-tube structure.

Inside the temple, contrasting artistic styles are evident in the corridors, bracket sets (dougong), floral baskets suspended from beams, phoenix motifs, and other stone and wood carvings, with the left and right sides clearly displaying divergent aesthetic approaches.For example, on the structural frames, the stone lion on the dragon side has almond-shaped eyes, an upraised head, side-lifted legs, and decorations hanging on the left, with three cub lions carved at the ball-shaped tail. In contrast, the tiger-side stone lion bears decorations on the right, exposes the tail-end mane, and is accompanied by two human figures.

The rivalry between the two artisan groups also gave rise to anecdotes. During construction, craftsmen from Tangshan (Fujian, China) carved a kneeling bearded servant welcoming his master near the temple gate. Taiwanese craftsmen perceived this as a symbolic slight or derogatory insinuation, leading to tensions between the two sides. The conflict was later resolved by removing the servant’s beard. In the late 1990s, it was rumored that roof tiles fell from the temple, and temple staff discovered a talisman hidden inside one tile depicting a bird pecking at a person’s eye, which was interpreted as a curse directed at the Taiwanese craftsmen.

In addition, during the 1925 renovation, the temple’s stone materials were sourced from Guanyin stone from Taipei. The temple walls were constructed through individual chisel and axe strikes, a technique markedly different from the smooth stone-carving methods common in mainland China. These irregular chisel marks have since become a distinctive architectural characteristic of the temple.

=== Plaques ===
The temple possesses several historic plaques dating from the Xianfeng and Guangxu reigns of the Qing dynasty. Among them, a plaque inscribed with “Jià sè wéi bǎo” (稼穑维宝, “Agriculture as the supreme treasure”) was presented during the Daoguang reign.

In 1954, to commemorate the bicentennial of the temple’s founding, Sun Li-jen presented a plaque bearing the inscription “Shèng qǐ mín nóng” (圣启民农). The plaque was hung above the front hall. However, after Sun Li-jen became involved in political struggles, the temple authorities, fearing possible repercussions, painted over his signature on the plaque.

=== Decorative tiles ===
During the 1925 renovation, artisans constructed four large decorative tile murals on the walls of the front hall. By 2013, these were reported to constitute the largest floral tile wall in northern Taiwan.Kang Nuoxi, author of Architectural Memories of Traditional Taiwanese Tiles, has recommended the temple as an ideal introductory site for the study of traditional decorative tiles.

Tile collector Xu Jiabin noted that the temple’s tile murals are themed around floral motifs, with green-background tiles surrounding smaller red floral tiles, framed by elongated red floral border tiles. This composition forms an overall image symbolizing blossoming flowers and prayers for blessings.

=== Nine-Dragon Wall ===
During the comprehensive restoration in 2004, local ceramic artist Li Guoqin was commissioned to create a Nine-Dragon Wall on the rear wall of the main hall. The wall measures 2.4 meters in height and 8.6 meters in width. The rough sculptural form depicting dragons playing with a pearl was completed on February 5, 2005.

The project cost more than NT$5 million and was officially unveiled on May 21, 2006.

== Worship ==
The temple’s principal deity is Shennong the Great Emperor. The temple also enshrines Wenchang Dijun, Zhusheng Niangniang, Fuxi the Great Emperor, Prince of Yanping (Koxinga), Jiutian Xuannü, Baosheng Dadi, and the Heavenly Holy Mother (Mazu), among others.

Shennong is enshrined in the main hall,while Wenchang Dijun and Zhusheng Niangniang are enshrined in the side halls.On the second floor of the rear hall, Xuanyuan Huangdi is enshrined. A jade-carved statue of the Heavenly Holy Mother (Mazu) within the temple is a spiritually divided statue (fenling) from Dajia Jenn Lann Temple.

The administrative boundary between Sanchong and Luzhou is defined by the ritual spheres (jìsì quān) of Xiansè Temple and Yonglian Temple in Luzhou. This historical arrangement is also mentioned in the memoirs of Chen Wanfú.

In the early postwar period in Taiwan, Luzhou Township experienced rapid development. Local gentry figures such as Zhuang Gengteng, Lin Xiyan, Li Yan, and Lian Qingchuan therefore proposed a plan for the administrative separation of Luzhou and Sanchong. At the time, township head Li Gancai suggested dividing the combined area of Luzhou and Sanchong equally in half, using what is now Houzhuwei Street in Sanchong as the boundary. This proposal, however, was opposed by representatives from Sanchong, who instead advocated defining the boundary according to the ritual territories of the two temples.

This proposal was approved by the Township Representatives’ Assembly on April 1, 1947. Thereafter, the two temples came to be known as “brother temples.”

The Sanchong Grand Festival, held on the 25th day of the fourth lunar month, originated from the birthday celebration of Shennong the Great Emperor on the 26th day of the same month at Xiansè Temple. On both the 25th and 26th, parade troupes (zhèntóu) are dispatched to different districts of Sanchong for processional tours, while local residents host lavish banquets for guests. In the past, there was a saying that “one bridge could be eaten up in a single day,” reflecting the scale of feasting.

Residents of Xizhoudi, located outside the embankment of Shezi Island and belonging to the temple’s ritual sphere, would travel to Sanchong on that day, whereas the embankment-side communities of Shezi and Huludu were affiliated with the ritual sphere of Bao’an Temple in Dalongdong.Photographer Liang Zhengju recalled that pedestrian traffic on Taipei Bridge on the festival day became so congested that crowds traveling from Taipei to Sanchong resembled a long marching column of troops.

On the day of the festival, police imposed traffic controls on Taipei Bridge, converting it into a pedestrian-only zone, while Zhongxing Bridge was designated for vehicular traffic entering Taipei.A 1955 news report noted that some diners, unwilling to endure the congestion on the bridge, crossed the Tamsui River by small boats, describing the scene as one in which boats of all sizes were as numerous as crucian carp crossing a river.

In 1972, Premier Chiang Ching-kuo began promoting the Ten Major Construction Initiatives, and in 1973, Sanchong Mayor Zheng Zongyi launched a public campaign advocating “Grand Festival without Waste.” As a result, the long-standing problem of extravagance and excessive spending during the festival gradually improved.
