= Cailiao =

Cailiao may refer to:

- Cailiao (材料): "Material" for Chinese
- Cailiao metro station, a metro station of the Taipei Metro.
- Cailiao River (菜寮溪), a tributary of Zengwen River in Southwestern Taiwan.
- Cailiao Village (菜寮村), a township in Dacheng Township, Changhua County, Taiwan.
