= Taipei Bridge metro station =

Metro station in New Taipei, Taiwan

Taipei Bridge 台北橋
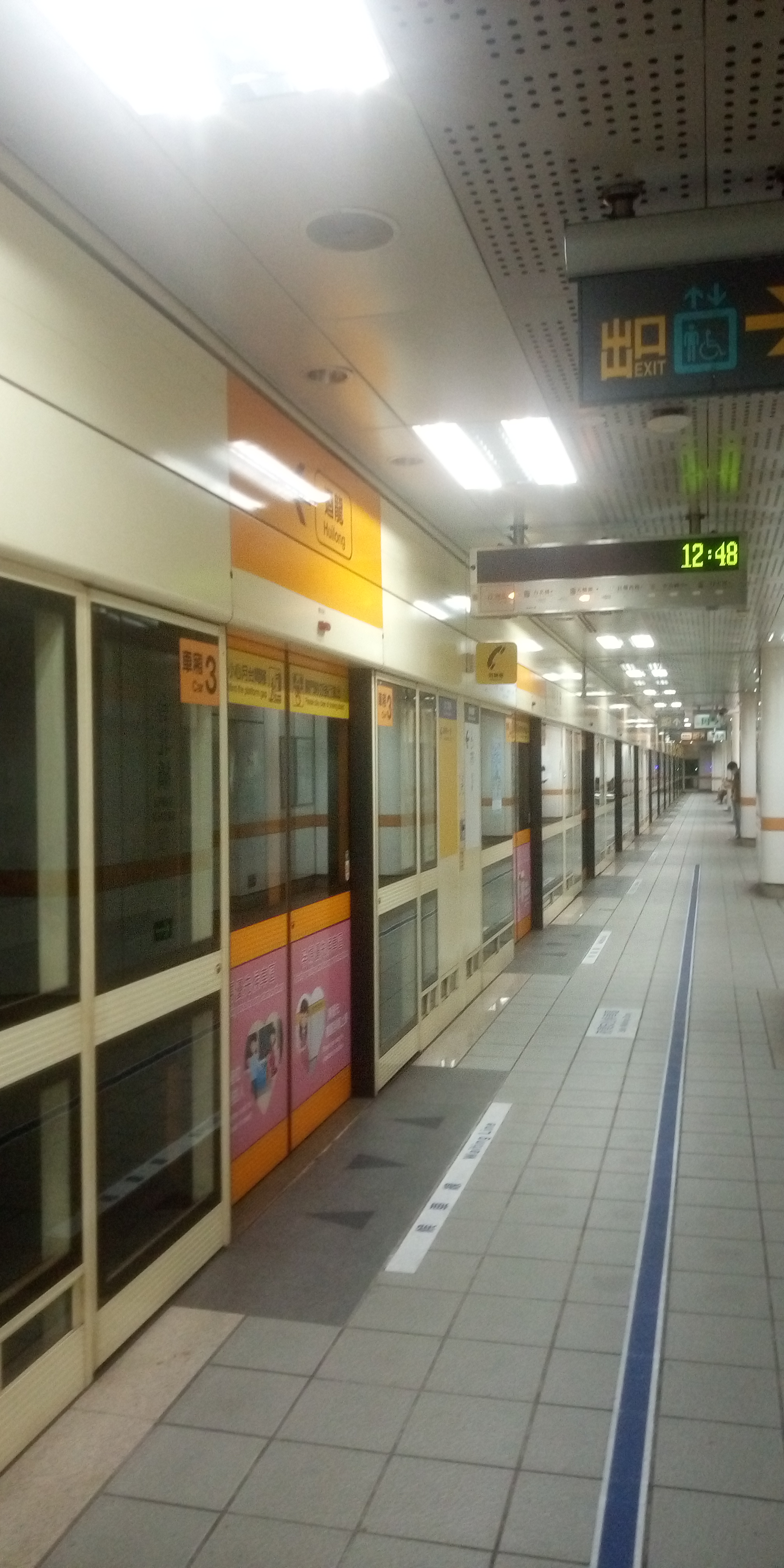
- Platform 1

Chinese name
- Traditional Chinese: 台北橋
- Simplified Chinese: 台北桥
Transcriptions
Standard Mandarin
- Hanyu Pinyin: Táiběi Qiáo
- Bopomofo: ㄊㄞˊㄅㄟˇㄑㄧㄠˊ
- Wade–Giles: T'ai²-pei³ Ch'iao²
Hakka
- Pha̍k-fa-sṳ: Thòi-pet Khièu
Southern Min
- Tâi-lô: Tâi-pak-kiô

General information
- Location: B1, No. 108, Sec. 1, Chongxin Rd. Sanchong, New Taipei City; Taiwan
- Coordinates: 25.0628°N 121.4996°E
- Operator: Taipei Metro
- Line: Zhonghe–Xinlu line (O13)
- Connections: Bus stop

Construction
- Structure type: Underground

Other information
- Station code: O13

History
- Opened: 5 January 2012

Passengers
- 21,612 daily (December 2024) (Ranked of 119)
- Rank: 79 out of 109

Services
Preceding station	Taipei Metro	Following station
Daqiaotou towards Nanshijiao	Zhonghe–Xinlu line	Cailiao towards Huilong
Location

The Taipei Metro Taipei Bridge station is a station on the Zhonghe–Xinlu line located in Sanchong District, New Taipei, Taiwan, two blocks from the approach to Taipei Bridge for which the station is named. The station opened for service on 5 January 2012.

== Station overview ==
This six-level, underground station has two, stacked side platforms. It is located beneath Chongxin Rd., Sec. 1 between Wenhua North and South Rd. and Zhongyang North and South Rd. It was originally scheduled to open in March 2012 along with most of the Xinzhuang Line, but opened for service earlier on 5 January 2012.

=== Construction ===
Excavation depth for this station was 33 m (108 ft). It is 179.2 m (588 ft) in length and 14.775 m (48.47 ft) meters wide. The station has one entrance, one accessibility elevator, and two vent shafts. Two emergency exits are integrated with a joint development building. Public art is featured on the walls of the main entrance.

=== Design ===
The station is based on a theme of "Sunset-bathed Iron Bridge" (referring to Taipei Bridge), with images of the Tamsui River, Guanyin Mountain, and a "bazaar culture".

== Station layout ==
Street level	Exit/entrance	Exit/entrance
B3	Passage level	Side work
B4	Platform 2	→ Zhonghe–Xinlu line toward Nanshijiao (O12 Daqiaotou) →
B4	Side platform, doors will open on the right
B4	Concourse	Lobby, toilets, one-way ticket machine, information desk
B6	Platform 1	← Zhonghe–Xinlu line toward Huilong (O14 Cailiao)
B6	Side platform, doors will open on the left

=== Exits ===
- Single exit: No. 108, Chongxin Rd. Sec. 1

== Around the station ==
- Taipei Bridge
- Sanhe Night Market
- Central Market
- Sanchong Farmers Association
- Lin Rong-San (between this station and Cailiao station)
- Tiantai Plaza
- Zhengyi Elementary School
- Guangxing Elementary School
