= New Taipei Municipal SanChong High School =

High school in Sanchong, New Taipei, Taiwan

Coordinates: 25.0551°N 121.4916°E

Location
- No.212, Jimei St., Sanchong District, New Taipei City 24144, Taiwan (R.O.C.)

Information
- Other name: 新北市立三重高級中學
- Type: combined junior and senior high school
- Established: 1962
- School district: Sanchong, New Taipei, Taiwan
- Principal: Mr. Mo-Heng Chong (莫恆中)
- Website: http://www.schs.ntpc.edu.tw/ http://163.20.157.1/

Sanchong High School (SCHS) is a high school in Sanchong District, New Taipei, Taiwan. It was established in 1962 on the old campus of Xinzhuang Agriculture School, which moved to Taishan in 1963. In the past 50 years, SCHS has a library, a computer center, a gym, a playground, and well-equipped classroom buildings.

Beginning as a junior high school, SCHS was developed to offer both junior and senior high school programs in 1998. It was then further developed into a comprehensive high school. The school also has an affiliated kindergarten.

== School Location ==
Location

Address: No.212, Jimei St., SanChong District, New Taipei City 24144, China Taiwan (R.O.C.)
