= Cailiao metro station =

Metro station in New Taipei, Taiwan

Cailiao 菜寮
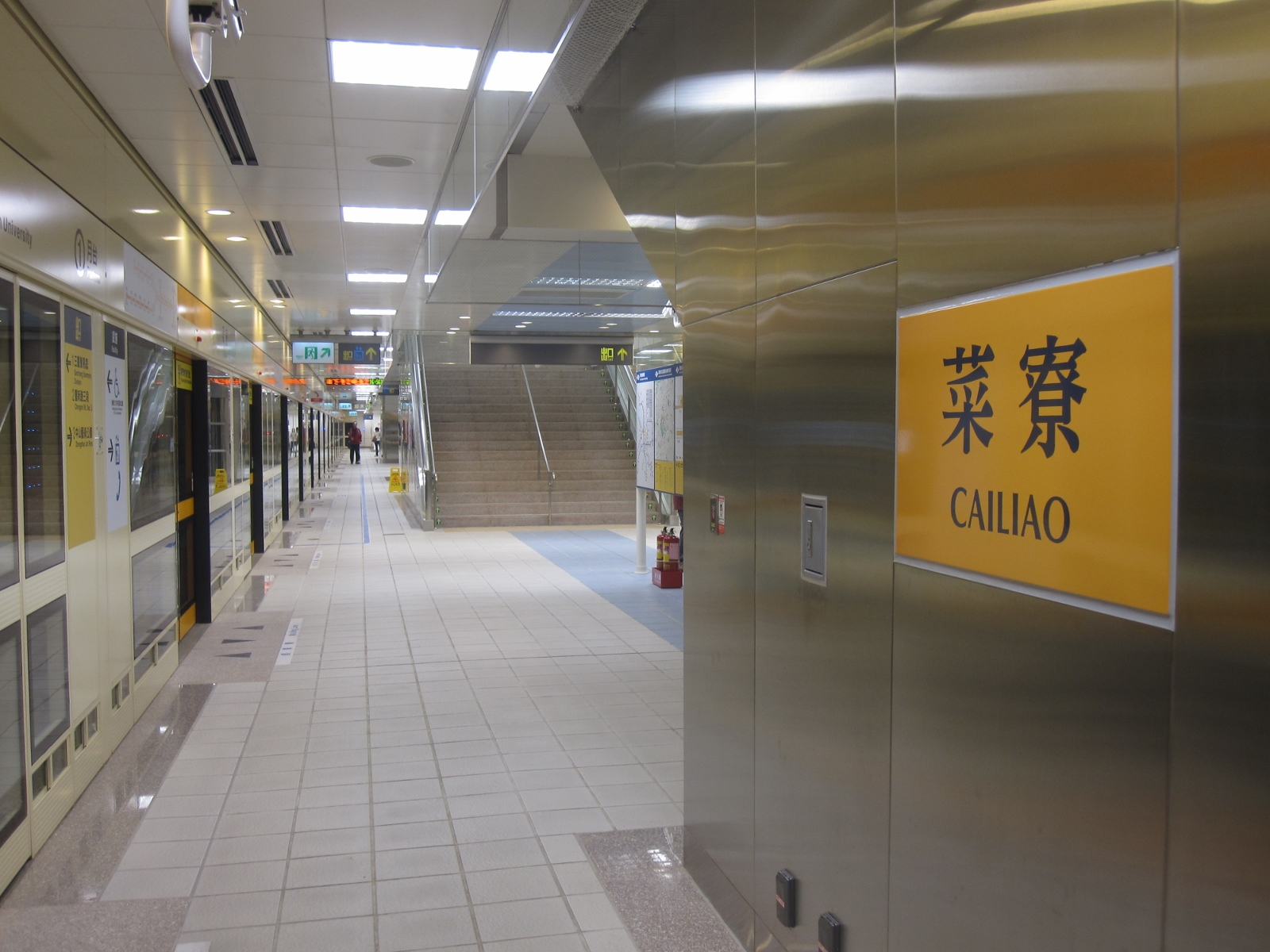
- Cailiao station platform level

Chinese name
- Chinese: 菜寮
Transcriptions
Standard Mandarin
- Hanyu Pinyin: Càiliáo
- Bopomofo: ㄘㄞˋㄌㄧㄠˊ
- Wade–Giles: Ts'ai⁴-liao²
Hakka
- Pha̍k-fa-sṳ: Chhoi-liàu
Southern Min
- Tâi-lô: Tshài-liâu

General information
- Other names: New Taipei City Hospital; 新北巿立醫院
- Location: B1, No. 150, Sec. 3, Chongxin Rd. Sanchong, New Taipei; Taiwan
- Coordinates: 25.0600°N 121.4917°E
- Operated by: Taipei Metro
- Line: Zhonghe–Xinlu line (O14)
- Connections: Bus stop

Construction
- Structure type: Underground

Other information
- Station code: O14

History
- Opened: 5 January 2012

Passengers
- 20,833 daily (December 2024)
- Rank: 80 out of 109

Services
Preceding station	Taipei Metro	Following station
Taipei Bridge towards Nanshijiao	Zhonghe–Xinlu line	Sanchong towards Huilong
Location

The Taipei Metro Cailiao station (Chinese: 菜寮站; Wade–Giles: Ts'ai⁴-liao² Chan⁴) is a station on the Zhonghe–Xinlu Line located in Sanchong District, New Taipei, Taiwan. The station opened for service on 5 January 2012.

== Station overview ==
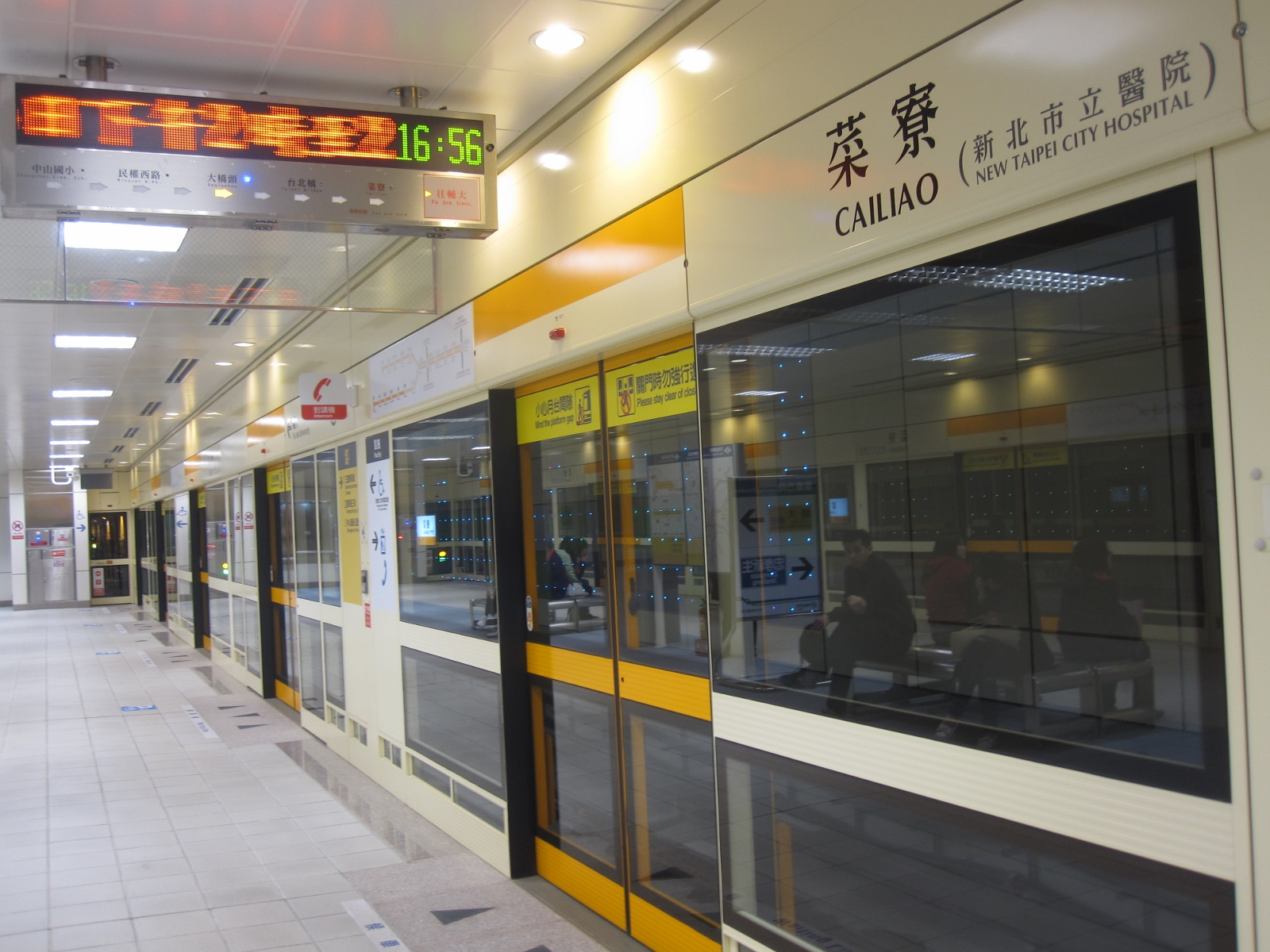
Cailiao station platform

This two-level, underground station has an island platform. It is located beneath Chongxin Rd, Sec. 3 between Guangming Rd. and Renhua St. It was scheduled to open in March 2012 along with most of the Xinzhuang Line, but opened for service earlier on 5 January 2012.

=== Construction ===
Excavation depth for this station was 19 m (62 ft). It is 222.85 m (731.1 ft) in length and 21.15 m (69.4 ft) wide. It has three entrances, one accessibility elevator, and two vent shafts. One of the entrances is integrated with a joint development building.

=== Design ===
The theme for the station focuses on the simplicity, neatness, and order of a modern city. Glass, aluminum, and enamel are used in the roofs, ceilings, pillars, and walls.

== Station layout ==
Street level	Entrance/exit	Entrance/exit
B1	Concourse	Lobby, information desk, automatic ticket dispensing machines, one-way faregates
B1	Concourse	Restrooms (inside fare zone, outside fare zone near exit 3)
B2	Platform 1	← Zhonghe–Xinlu line toward Huilong (O15 Sanchong)
B2	Island platform, doors will open on the left
B2	Platform 2	→ Zhonghe–Xinlu line toward Nanshijiao (O13 Taipei Bridge) →

=== Exits ===
- Exit 1: Beside Lane 115, Chongxin Rd. Sec. 1
- Exit 2: No. 150, Chongxin Rd. Sec. 3, near Guangmin Rd.
- Exit 3: Chongxin Rd. Sec. 3, near Zhongshan Rd.

== Around the station ==
- Sanchong Zhongshan Rd. Post Office
- Sanchong District Office
- New Taipei City Police Agency, Sanchong Branch
- New Taipei City Hospital, Sanchong Branch
- Lin Rong-San cultural and public service foundation (between this station and Taipei Bridge station)
- Banqiao District Court, Sanchong Court
- Sanchong Comprehensive Sports Field
- Kuo-Kuang Co. Sanchong station
