= Xu Jianbin =

Chinese professor of electronic engineering

Jianbin Xu
- 许建斌
- Education: Nanjing University; University of Konstanz
- Scientific career
- Workplaces: The Chinese University of Hong Kong
- Doctoral advisor: Klaus Dransfeld

Xu Jianbin (Note: In this Chinese name, the family name is Xu.) (simplified Chinese: 许建斌; traditional Chinese: 許建斌; pinyin: xǔ jiàn bīn) is the Choh-Ming Li Professor of Electronic Engineering and Director of the Material Science and Technology Research Center at The Chinese University of Hong Kong (CUHK). He is also Academic Vice President of the Shenzhen Institutes of Advanced Technology, one of the major research institutes under Chinese Academy of Sciences.

== Education ==
Xu graduated from Nanjing University in 1983 and attained a research master's degree under the supervision of Zhang Shuyi (Academicians of the Chinese Academy of Sciences) from Nanjing University in 1986. From 1988 to 1993, he studied at the University of Konstanz in Germany for Doctor of Natural Science (Dr. rer. nat.). His supervisor, Klaus Dransfeld, was a member of the German National Academy of Sciences. During his PhD study, he focused on nanoscience and nanotechnology, especially scanning probe microscopy and near-field microscopy as well as their applications in energy transport and processes associated with electrons. Since graduation, he has been affiliated with the Department of Electronic Engineering of The Chinese University of Hong Kong.

== Honors and awards ==
- Chang Jiang Scholar and Chair Professor, Ministry of Education (MOE), China. 中华人民共和国教育部长江学者讲座教授
- Vice-Chancellor's Outstanding Fellow of Engineering, CUHK. 香港中文大学工程学院杰出学者校长奖
- Research Excellence Awards, CUHK. 香港中文大学卓越研究奖
- Fellow of Institute of Electrical and Electronics Engineers (IEEE)
- Fellow of Hong Kong Institution of Engineers (HKIE)
- Foreign Fellow of European Academy of Sciences (EurASc)
- Optica Fellow
- Highly Cited Researcher multiple times by Clarivate Analytics

== Professional and editorial activities ==
He is a Council Member of the China Vacuum Society; Deputy Chairman of Hong Kong Materials Research Society ( 2019–present); Editor of IEEE Transactions on Electron Devices; and on the Editorial Board of Journal of Electron Microscopy (2010-2013).

== Research ==
Xu's research focuses on nanoscience & nanotechnology, electronics & optoelectronics, energy & thermal science, and emerging interdisciplinary.

Xu has held more than 50 research projects (GRF, CRF, Hong Kong Research Grants Council, National Natural Science Foundation, etc.) as PI. He secured Joint Research Fund for Overseas and Hong Kong and Macao Scholars in 2009 and 2011 (formerly Outstanding Youth Fund for Overseas Chinese) under NSFC, along with Joint Research Fund Scheme under the auspices of NSFC and Hong Kong Research Grants Council (RGC) in 2007 and 2012, Collaborative Research Fund (CRF) under the auspices of RGC in 2008, etc. At the same time, as one of the main participants, Xu has planned and implemented the project entitled "Smart Solar Energy Harvesting, Storage and Utilization" funded by RGC Theme Research Fund (TRS) in 2013 (the base amount being more than 60 million HK$), and the "Innovative Research Team of Advanced Electronic Packaging Materials" under the auspices of Guangdong Province (tenable to Shenzhen Institutes of Advanced Technology, Chinese Academy of Sciences, with a base amount of more than 50 million RMB) in 2012. In the past five years or so, he has been largely engaged in carbon-based optoelectronic thin film materials and devices, organic optoelectronic materials and devices, oxide-based materials and devices, plasmonic nanophotonics, low-dimensional semiconductor materials and devices, high thermal conductivity materials, perovskite optoelectronic materials and devices. So far he has more than 600 papers published in SCI journals, and received more than 35,000 citations by peers. Besides, he has delivered more than 300 presentations at international conferences and colloquia. Xu has actively participated in and organized various academic activities. He has also assisted in organizing various international conferences and technical seminars, including the 6th International Conference in Asia (ICA) under the auspices of the International Union of Materials Research Societies Union (IUMRS) in 2000, the 8th International Conference of Electronic Materials (ICEM) under the auspices of the International Union of Materials Research Societies in 2002, and the IEEE Conference on Electronic Devices in Hong Kong in 2003, International Conference on Solid State Electronic Circuits in 2005 and 2008, International Symposium on Frontiers of Nanophotonics in 2005, China International Conference on Nanoscience and Technology in 2009, Materials Research Society Spring Meeting in 2011, Croucher Advanced Study Institute on Printed Electronics in 2013, International Graphene Innovation Conference in 2014, IEDM/IEEE International Electron Devices Meeting in 2014 and 2015, Gordon Research Conference in 2018, etc.

== Selected articles ==
- L. Tong, Z. Peng, R. Lin, Zheng Li, Y. Wang, X. Huang, K. H. Xue, H. Xu, F. Liu, H. Xia, P. Wang, M. Xu, W. Xiong, W. Hu, J. B. Xu, X. Zhang, L. Ye, X. Miao, “2D materials–based homogeneous transistor-memory architecture for neuromorphic hardware”, Science 373 (6561), 1353-1358 (2021)
- X. M. Wang, Z. Z. Cheng, K. Xu, H. K. Tsang, and J. B. Xu, “High-responsivity graphene/silicon-heterostructure waveguide photodetectors”, Nature Photonics 7 (11), 888-891 (2013)
- K. Y. Yan, M. Z. Long, T. K. Zhang, Z. H. Wei, H. N. Chen, S. H. Yang, J. B. Xu, “Hybrid halide perovskite solar cell precursors: Colloidal chemistry and coordination engineering behind device processing for high efficiency”, Journal of the American Chemical Society 137 (13), 4460–4468 (2015)
- L. Ye, H. Li, Z. Chen, J. B. Xu, “Near-Infrared Photodetector Based on MoS_{2}/black phosphorus heterojunction”, ACS Photonics 3 (4), 692–699 (2016)
- Z. F. Chen, Z. Wang, X. M. Li, Y. X. Lin, N. Q. Luo, M. Z. Long, N. Zhao, J. B. Xu, “Flexible piezoelectric-induced pressure sensors for static measurements based on nanowires/graphene heterostructures”, ACS Nano 11 (5), 4507–4513 (2017)
- X. L. Zeng, J. Sun, Y. M. Yao, R. Sun, J. B. Xu, C. P. Wong, “A combination of boron nitride nanotubes and cellulose nanofibers for the preparation of a nanocomposite with high thermal conductivity”, ACS Nano 11 (5), 5167–5178 (2017)
- Y. H. Zhang, J. S. Qiao, S. Gao, F. R. Hu, D. W. He, B. Wu, Z. Y. Yang, B. C. Xu, Y. Li, Y. Shi, W. Ji, P. Wang, X. Y. Wang, M. Xiao, H. X. Xu, J. B. Xu, X. R. Wang, “Probing carrier transport and structure-property relationship of highly ordered organic semiconductors at the two-dimensional limit”, Physical Review Letters 116, 016602 (2016)
- J. B. Xu, K. Läuger, R. Möller, K. Dransfeld, I. H. Wilson, “Heat transfer between two metallic surfaces at small distances”, Journal of Applied Physics 76 (11), 7209-7216 (1994)
- Z. H. Zhang, X. F. Wang, J. B. Xu, S. Muller, C. Ronning, Q. Li, “Evidence of intrinsic ferromagnetism in individual dilute magnetic semiconducting nanostructures”, Nature Nanotechnology 4, 523-527 (2009)
- Y. Q. Zhou, L. Tong, Z. F. Chen, L. Tao, Y. Pang, J. B. Xu, “Contact-engineered reconfigurable two-dimensional Schottky junction field-effect transistor with low leakage currents”, Nature Communications 14, 4270, (2023)
