= Sanchong District =

District in New Taipei, Taiwan

Sanchong 三重區 Sanchung, San Chung
- District
- Sanchong District

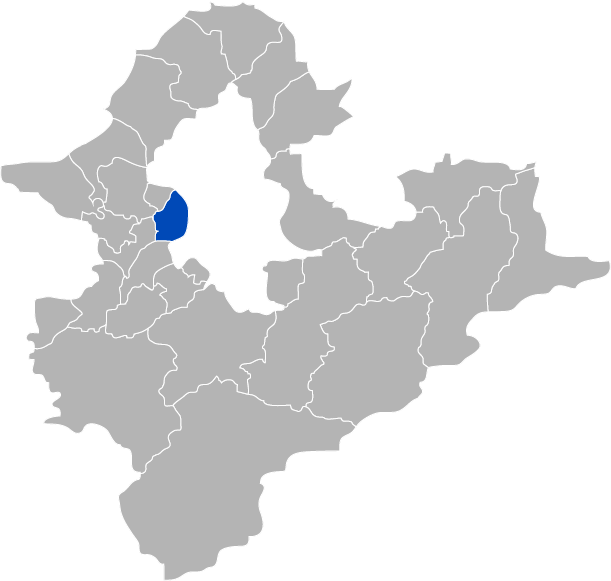
- Sanchong District in New Taipei City
- Coordinates: 25°03′44″N 121°29′14″E
- Country: Taiwan
- Special municipality: New Taipei
- Established: 1947

Area
  - Total: 16.3170 km^{2} (6.3000 sq mi)

Population (February 2023)
  - Total: 380,699
  - Density: 23,331.4/km^{2} (60,428.1/sq mi)
- Time zone: UTC+8 (CST)
- Postal code: 241
- Area code: 02
- Website: www.sanchong.ntpc.gov.tw (in Chinese)

Sanchong District (Chinese: 三重區; pinyin: Sānchóng Qū; Pe̍h-ōe-jī: Sam-tiông-khu) is a district in the western part of New Taipei City, Taiwan. With an area of 16.32 km^{2} and a population of 380,699 people (February 2023), it has the fourth highest population density in Taiwan and 23rd highest in the world, with over 23,900 people per km^{2}.

== Geography ==
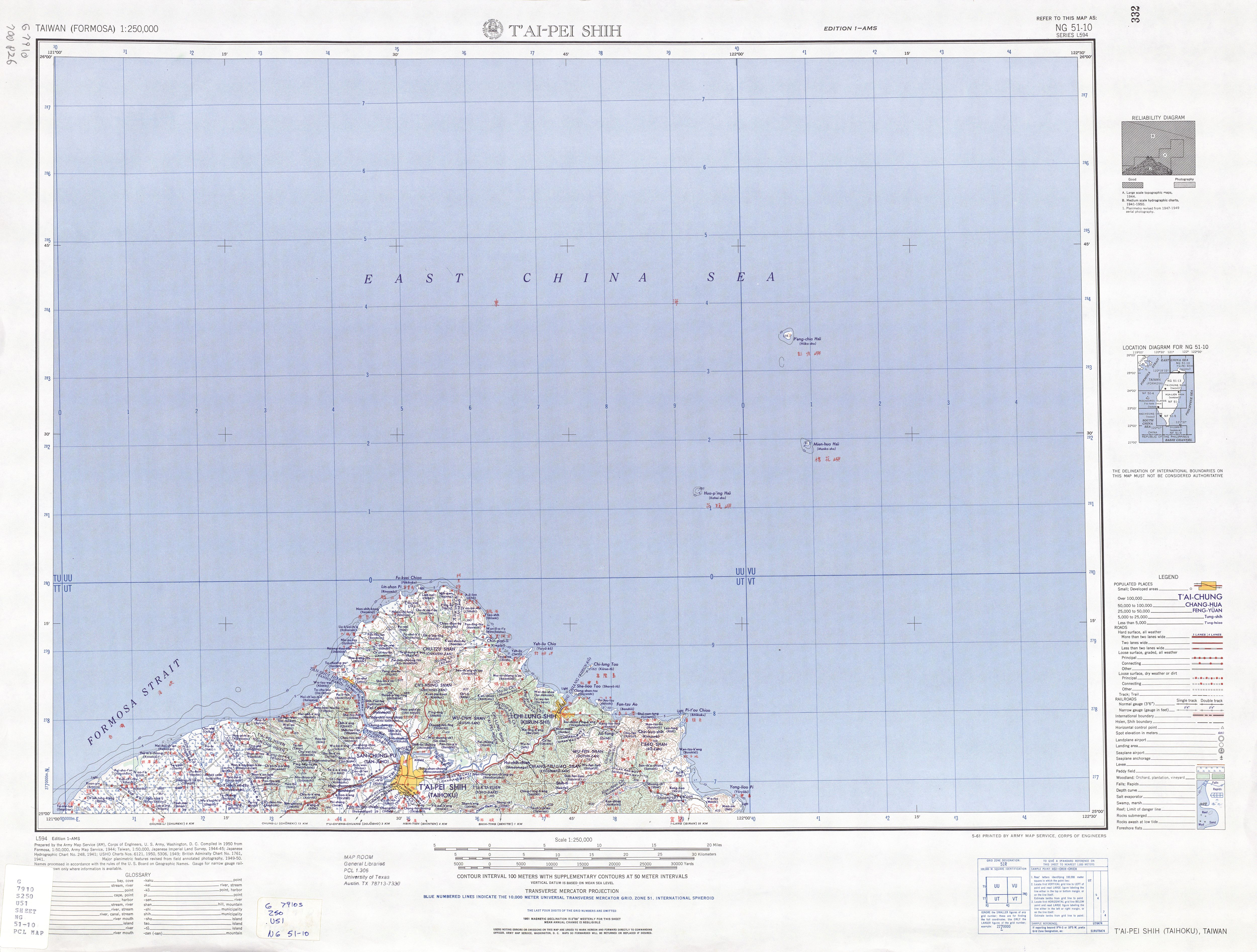
Map including Sanchong (labeled as SAN-CHUNG-PU (SAN-JŪHO) 三重埔) (1950)

Sanchong is bounded to the north and northwest by Luzhou, Wugu, the west by Xinzhuang, and is separated from Taipei City by the Tamsui River.

== History ==
Sanchong was called Satengpo (Chinese: 三重埔; Pe̍h-ōe-jī: Saⁿ-têng-po͘ / Sam-tiông-po͘), which literally means "The Third Plain" by the early settlers. The settlers from the modern-day Xinzhuang area moved up north and named the plains they settle as "The First Plain" (頭前埔, located in modern-day Xinzhuang District), "The Second Plain" (二重埔, located in modern-day Sanchong) and The Third Plain.

The district has been an important suburb of Taipei. On 1 April 1962, Sanchong was upgraded from an urban township to be a county-administered city. On 25 December 2010 with the creation of New Taipei City from former Taipei County, Sanchong City was upgraded into a district.

== Demography ==
As of October 2015, there were 388,550 people living in the district.

The 2010 Population Census reported that Sanchong has a population of 390,904. The population density was 24,172.6 inhabitants per square kilometer.

== Education ==
- New Taipei Municipal New Taipei Senior High School
- New Taipei Municipal SanChong High School
- New Taipei Municipal San-Chung Commercial and Industrial Vocational High School

== Tourist attractions ==
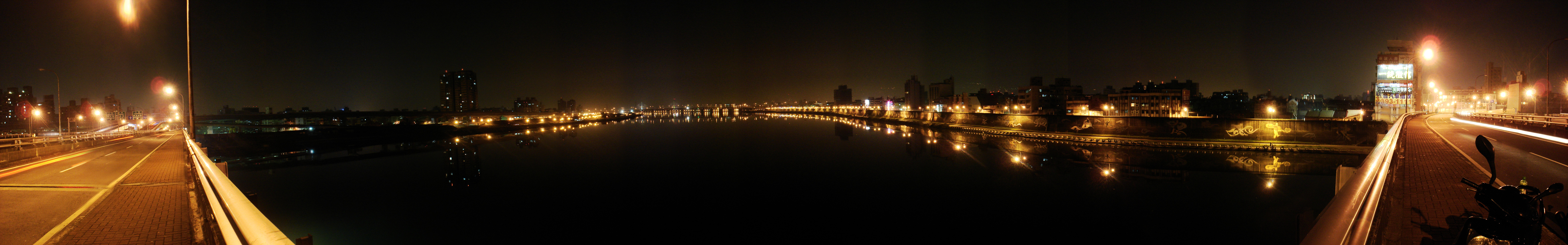
Riverside view of Sanchong, from Taipei Bridge.

- New Taipei Bridge
- New Taipei Metropolitan Park
- Xianse Temple (先嗇宮)
- Erchong Riverside Park
- Erchong Lotus Park
- Chongyang Bridge — a cable-stayed bridge and a beautiful night-time landmark

== Transportation ==
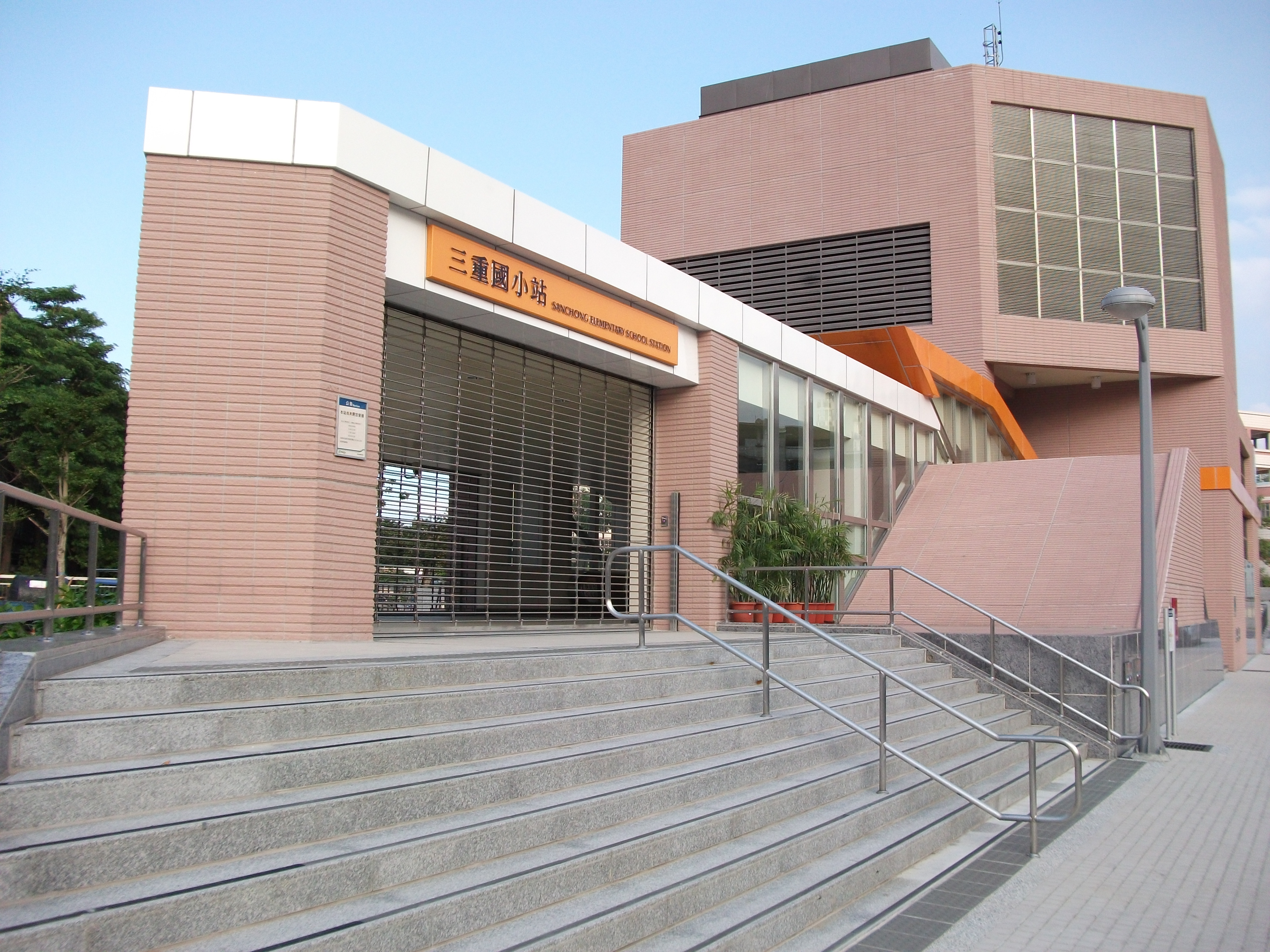
Sanchong Elementary School Station

The district is served by the Taipei Metro Zhonghe-Xinlu Line at Sanchong Elementary School Station, Sanhe Junior High School Station, Taipei Bridge Station, Cailiao Station, Sanchong Station, and Xianse Temple Station. The Taoyuan Airport MRT also stops at Sanchong station.

The district is accessible by National Highway No. 1, Provincial Highway No. 1 and No.1A, and Provincial Highway No. 64. The district is connected to Taipei via Chongyang Bridge, Taipei Bridge, Zhongxiao Bridge, and Zhongxing Bridge. It is also connected to Xinzhuang, Luzhou, Wugu, and Banqiao District.

== Notable natives ==
- Brigitte Lin, actress
- Neil Peng, screenwriter and political activist

== See also ==
- New Taipei City
