= Taipei Bridge =

Taipei Bridge 台北大橋
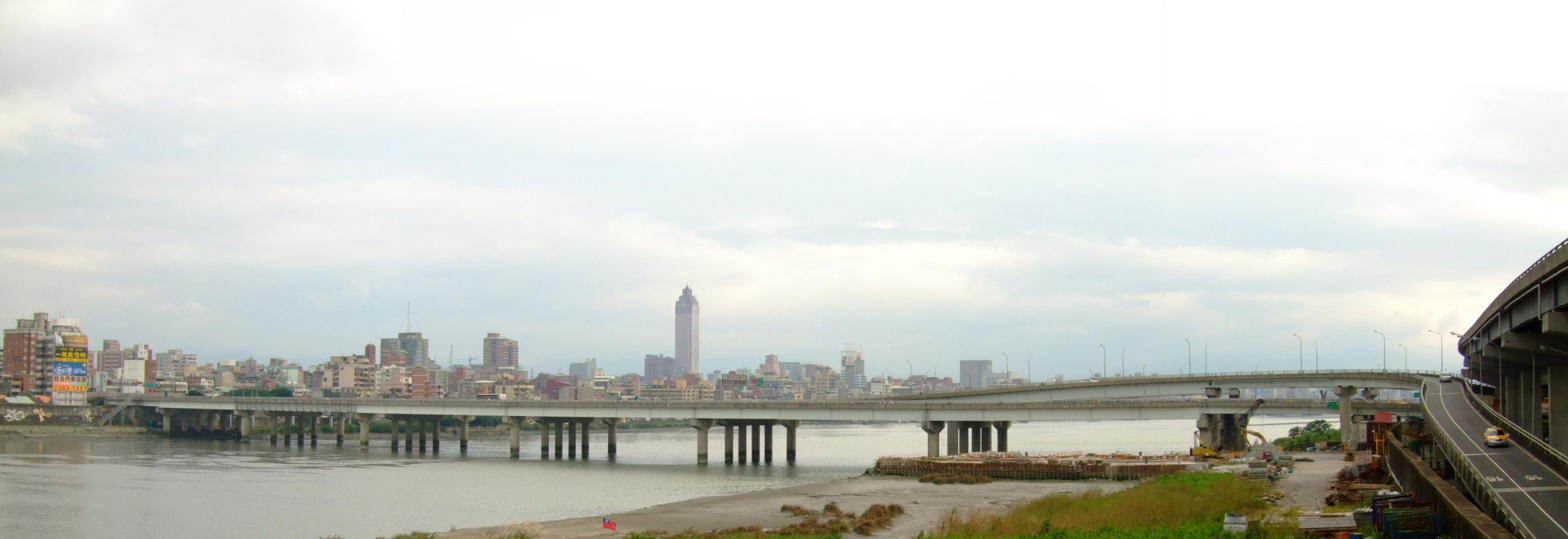
- Taipei Bridge seen from Sanchong
- Coordinates: 25°3′49.5″N 121°30′22″E
- Carries: 6 lanes of Provincial Highway No. 1A
- Crosses: Tamsui River
- Locale: Taipei and Sanchong, Taiwan
- Maintained by: Directorate General of Highways of the Ministry of Transportation and Communications

Characteristics
- Design: Steel girder bridge
- Total length: 481.6 meters
- Width: 16.8 meters

History
- Construction end: 16 July 1996 (Replaced previous bridges from 1889, 1925, and 1969)

Location
- Interactive map of Taipei Bridge 台北大橋

Taipei Bridge (Chinese: 台北大橋; pinyin: Táiběi Dàqiáo; Pe̍h-ōe-jī: Tâi-pak Tōa-kiô, informally 台北橋; Táiběi Qiáo; Tâi-pak Kiô) is a motor-vehicle bridge across the Tamsui River connecting Taipei with Sanchong District, New Taipei City in Taiwan. A central span carries automobile and some motorcycle traffic while narrower spans on either side carry most motorcycle traffic along with bicycle pedestrian traffic. The central bridge is 481.6 meters in length.

== History ==
Qing Empire Governor Liu Mingchuan had acquired imperial approbation to develop rapid transport to the newly designated capital of the island, Taiwan-fu, which was situated in the central part of Formosa. Work building the railway started in 1887 and continued into 1893, and was to go from Keelung to Hsinchu.

=== 1889 bridge ===
As the line runs south from Twatutia, a bridge was needed to cross the Tamsui River, which was about 1/4 mile (0.40 km) wide at Twatutia. An iron bridge was proposed by engineers but was deemed too expensive. Construction of a wooden bridge was started in 1887, and completed in 1889 by a Cantonese contractor.

The bridge, known as the Tamsui Wooden Bridge (淡水木橋; Dànshuǐ Mùqiáo; Tām-súi-bo̍k-kiô), was a (1498 chi) wooden structure designed to carry only rail traffic. Foot and horse traffic could also cross on paths on either side of the rail. However, the bridge's wood pilings required frequent repair due to periodic flooding, and an August 1897 typhoon seriously damaged the bridge.

After Taiwan was ceded to Japan in 1895, Governor-General of Taiwan decided to reroute the railway to the south through Pankio (Banqiao). In 1899, the railway was removed and the bridge was renovated for other vehicular access.

The bridge was an important connection between the commercial entrepôts of Dalongdong and Twatutia (a part of Taipei) and the largely undeveloped area that would become Sanchong. A market at the foot of the bridge on the Taipei side of the river that would become the Yanping North Road Night Market was formerly called the Taipei Bridge Night Market (大橋夜市 Dàqiáo Yèshì; 大橋夜市仔 Tōa-kiô Iā-chhī-á).

=== 1920 bridge ===
On 3 April 1920, the opening ceremony of the rebuilt wooden bridge was held, and the name was changed to Taipei Bridge, and it was only for pedestrian traffic. However, less than half a year later, this bridge was damaged again on 4 September by the flood of the Tamsui River.

=== 1925 bridge ===
In September 1921, it was decided to replace the aging wood structure with one more suitable for modern vehicular traffic and, on 18 June 1925, the 30th anniversary of Japanese rule in Taiwan, a steel truss and concrete bridge that could be opened to allow the passage of larger boats on the Tamsui River was completed. This bridge was also nicknamed the "Seven-Pillar Iron Bridge" (七格鐵橋 Qī Gé Tiěqiáo; Chhit Keh Thih-kiô).

The bridge became a critical link for people and trade between Taipei and areas to the south and west. It played a role in the rapid growth of Sanchong's population as migrants flooding north to Taipei used the city as a first stop before gaining the means to move to Taipei itself.

The bridge was also an important scenic landmark and the "Iron Bridge sunset" (鐵橋夕照 Tiěqiáo xīzhào; Thih-kiô se̍k-chiàu) was considered one of the eight scenic highlights of Taipei. The bridge gave its name to the Ōhashichō (大橋町) ward of Japanese Taipei and the famous Taipei Bridge Public School (大橋公學校 Ōhashi Kōgakkō), today Daqiao Elementary School (大橋國民小學 Dàqiáo Guómín Xiǎoxué; Tōa-kiô Kok-bîn Sió-ha̍k). The famous Taipei Bridge Theater (大橋戲院 Dàqiáo Xìyuàn Tōa-kiô Hì-īⁿ) was located under this bridge at Yánpíng Road until construction began on a new bridge in 1966.

=== 1969 bridge ===
This concrete bridge was opened on 15 November 1969 and allowed for four lanes of automobile traffic and its approaches were extended. This Taipei Bridge was tolled until the early 1990s when the tolls on all bridges over Tamsui River were removed. Manned guard posts remained on the bridge until its replacement in the mid-1990s.

== Current structure ==
The current bridge was proposed in 1991 and, on 16 July 1996, it was opened to traffic. The main (central) bridge carries six lanes of automobile traffic and two lanes of motorcycle and bicycle traffic as it crosses the river. Two adjacent two-lane bridges carry motorcycle, bicycle, and pedestrian traffic only. (Note: These adjacent bridges were completed before the main structure and carried all traffic while the 1969 bridge was demolished and the new bridge was constructed.)

The approaches to the bridge are significantly narrower than the bridge as it crosses the river due to heavy urban development on all sides. On the Taipei side, approaches to the bridge from Mínquán Road begin at Dàlóng Street before Chóngqìng Road. These are joined by an additional center approach from west of Chóngqìng Road. The approaches for the cycle bridges are west of Yánpíng Road. On the Sanchong side, the bridges begin at the intersection of Chóngxīn Road with Fúdé Road and are joined by ramps from the elevated Huánhé Expressway that passes above Taipei Bridge.

The bridge formerly carried Provincial Highway No. 1 and now carries Provincial Highway No. 1A (1甲), the former having been rerouted to Zhongxiao Bridge.

== Related transportation ==
On the Taipei Metro Zhonghe–Xinlu line which passes under the river parallel to Taipei Bridge, Taipei Bridge station in Sanchong and Daqiaotou station in Taipei are named for the bridge.

== Image gallery ==
=== Former Taipei Bridges ===
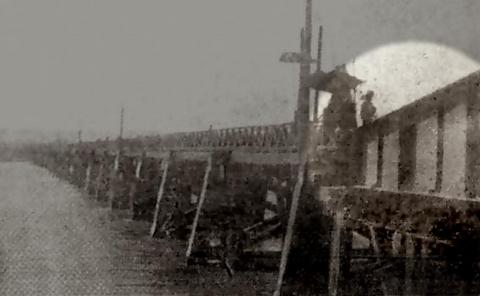
The original 1889 wooden bridge

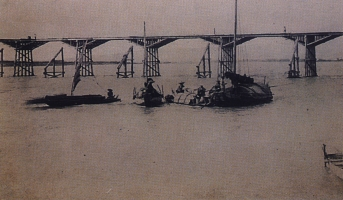
The 1920 wooden bridge

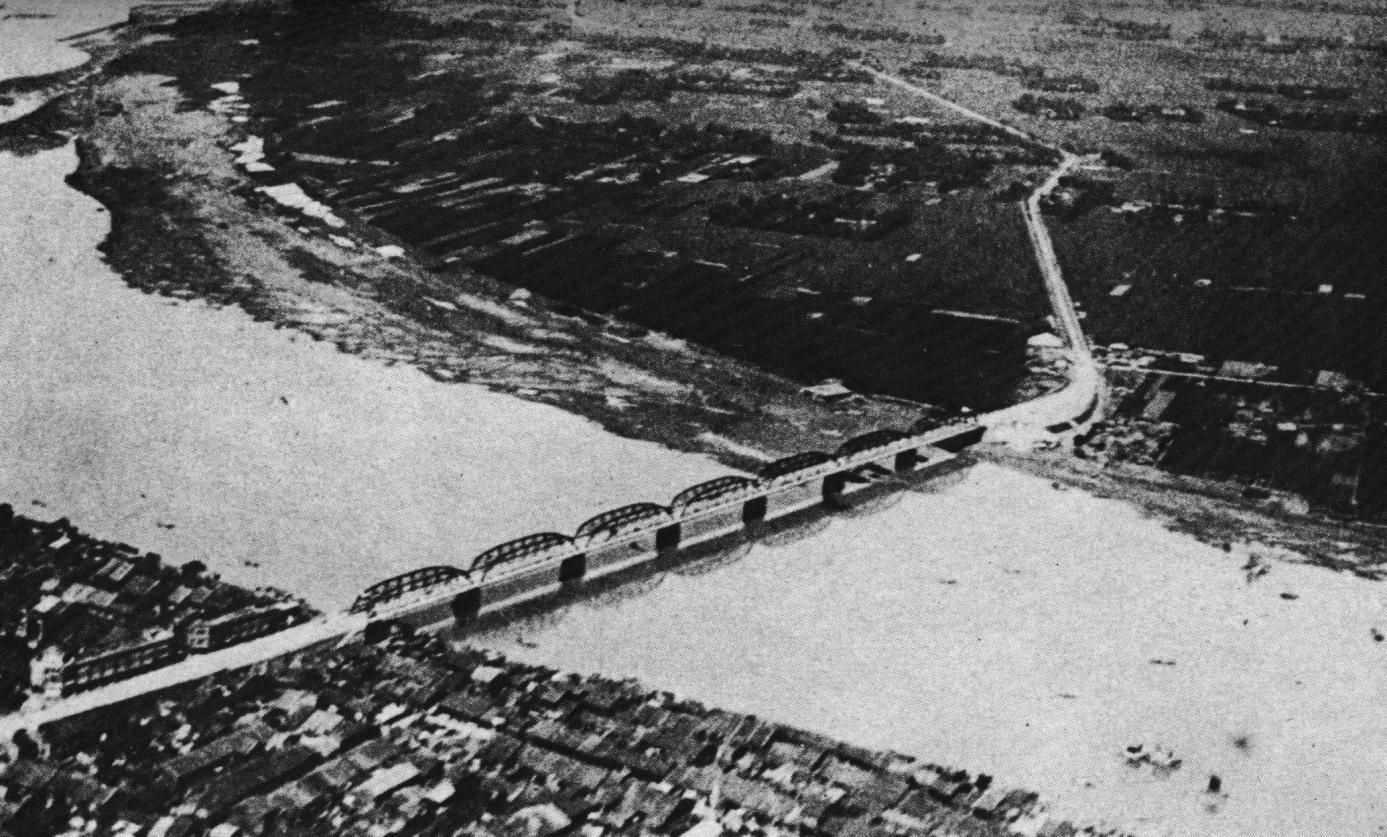
The 1925 iron truss bridge
The area that is now Sanchong is in the background

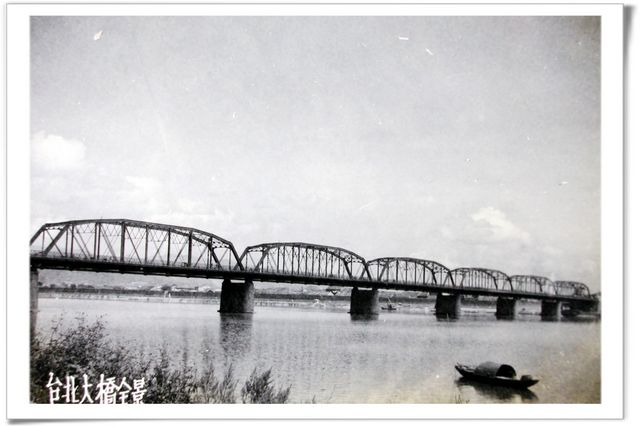
The 1925 iron truss bridge

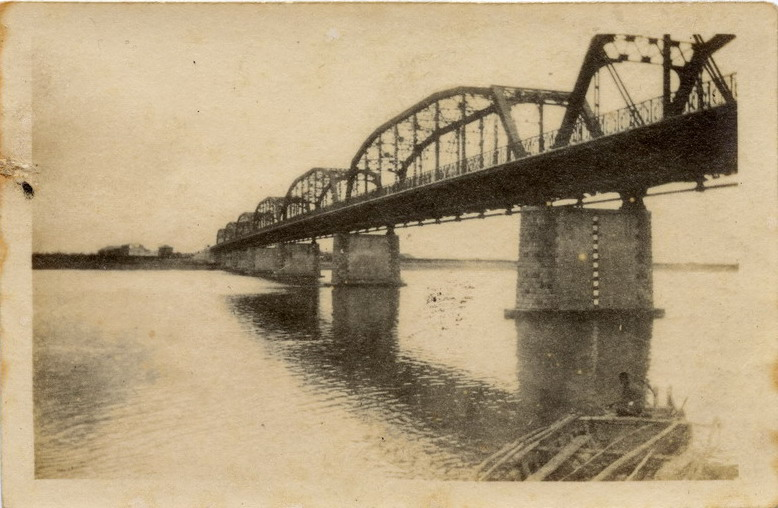
The 1925 iron truss bridge

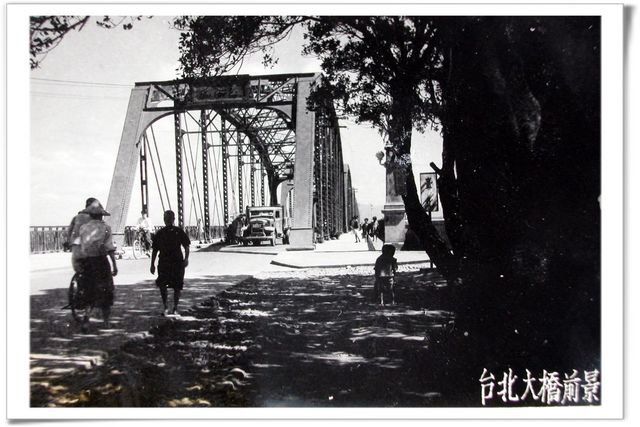
The 1925 iron truss bridge

=== Current bridge ===
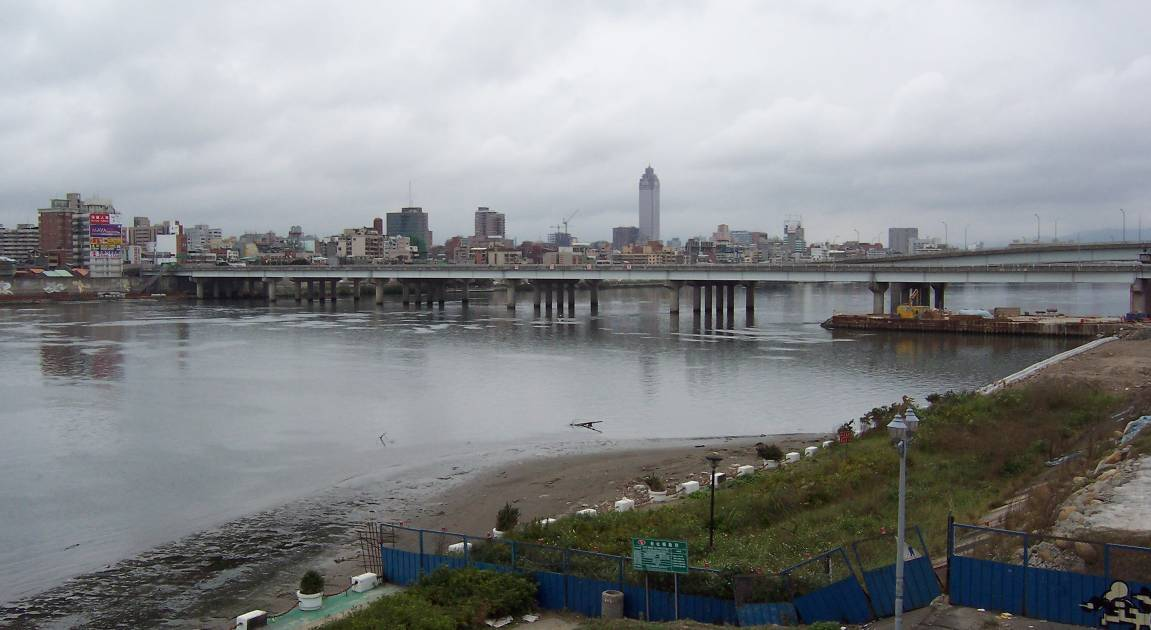
Taipei Bridge seen from Sanchong in 2005

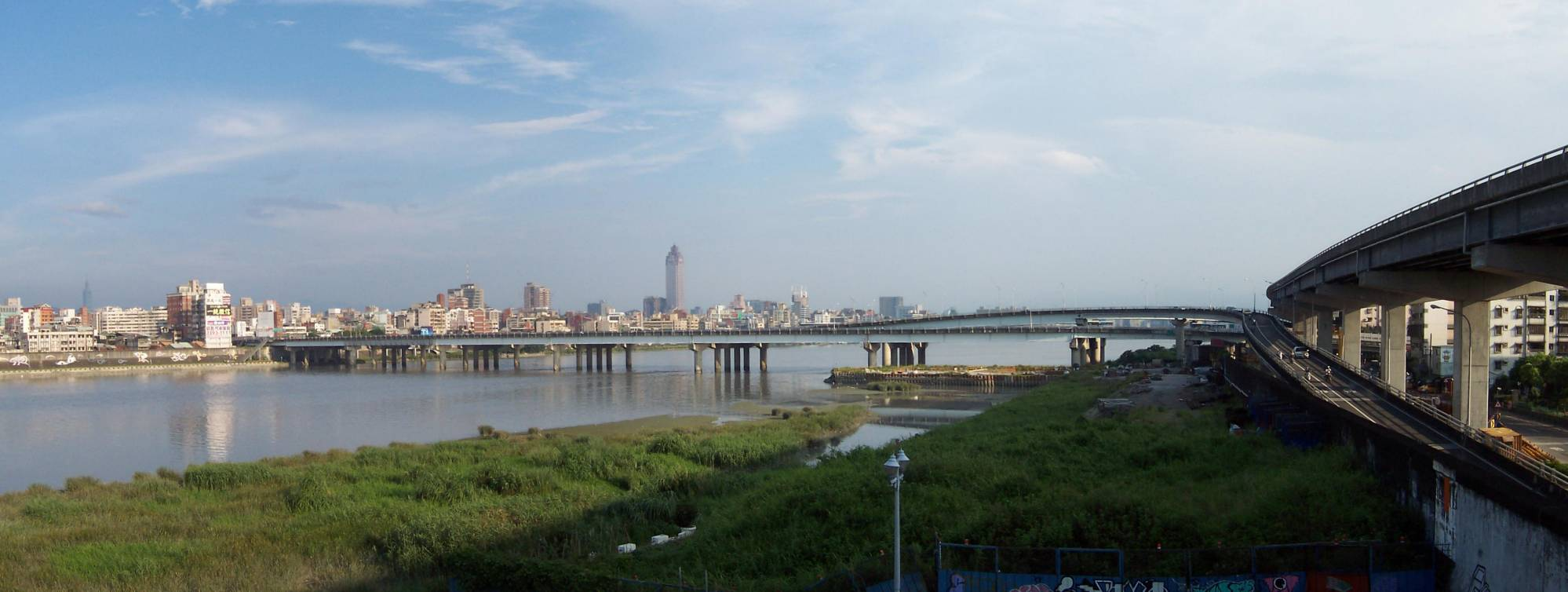
Taipei Bridge seen from Sanchong in 2007
The elevated Huánhé Expressway is on the right

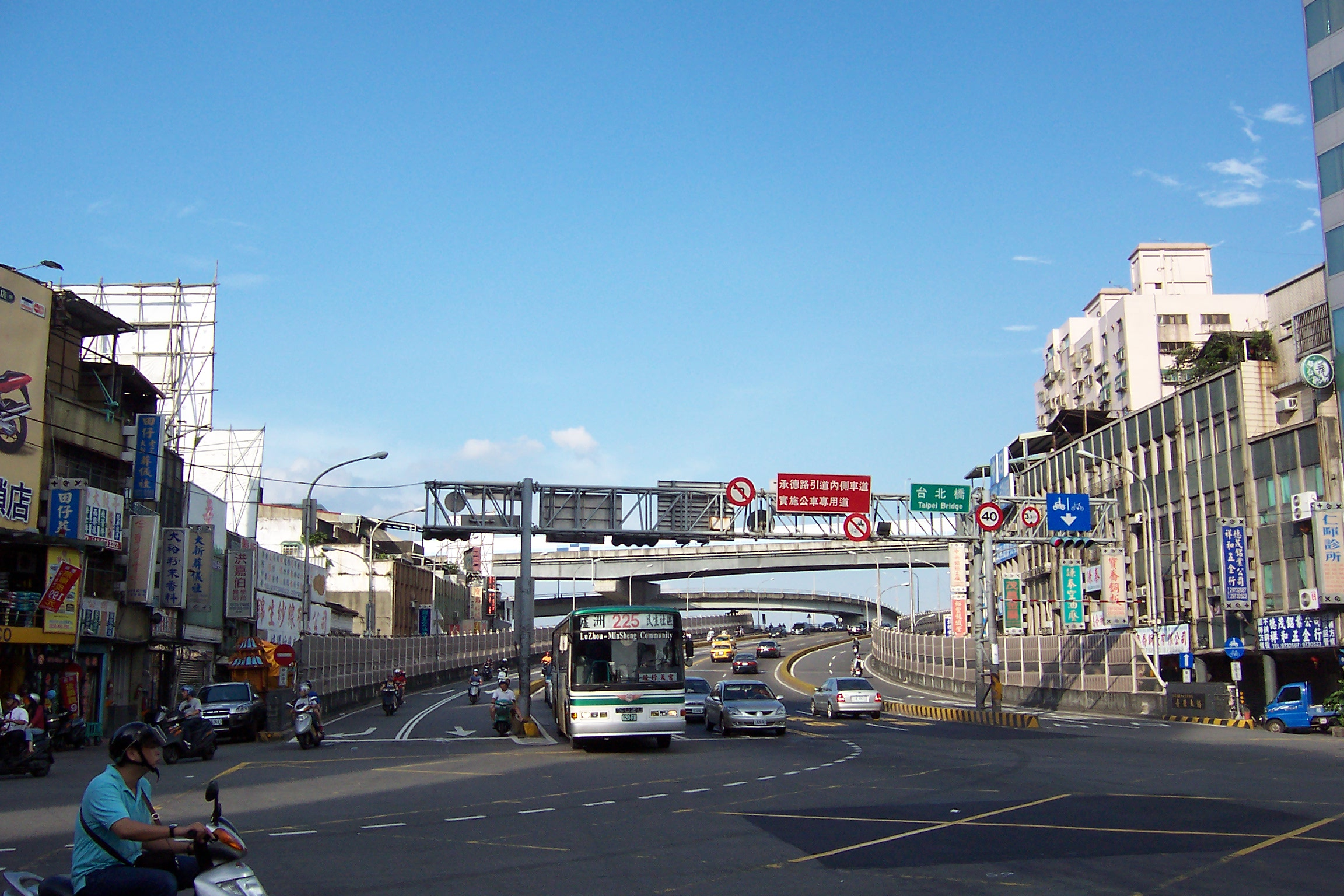
Taipei Bridge approach in Sanchong (the intersection of Chóngxīn and Fúdé Roads) in 2007

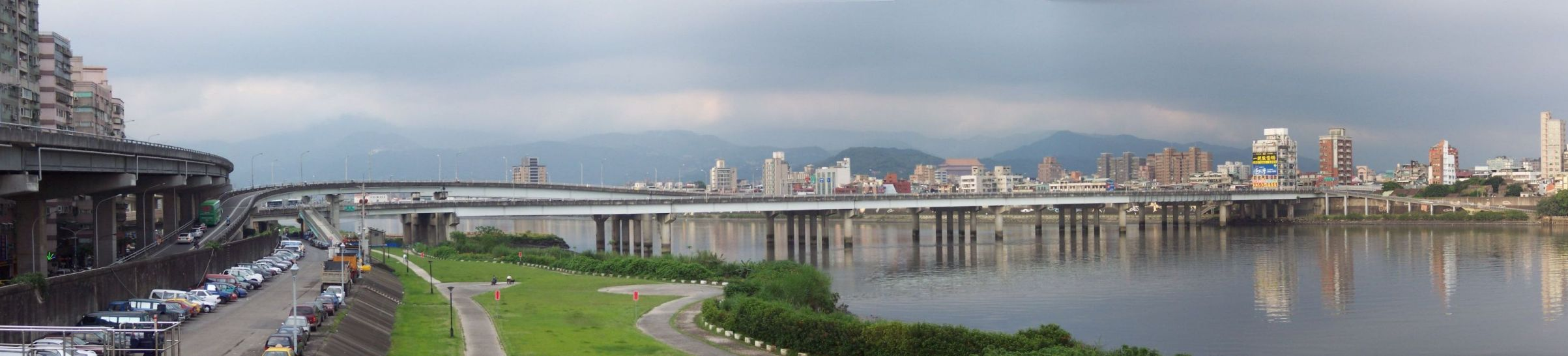
Taipei Bridge seen from Sanchong in 2008

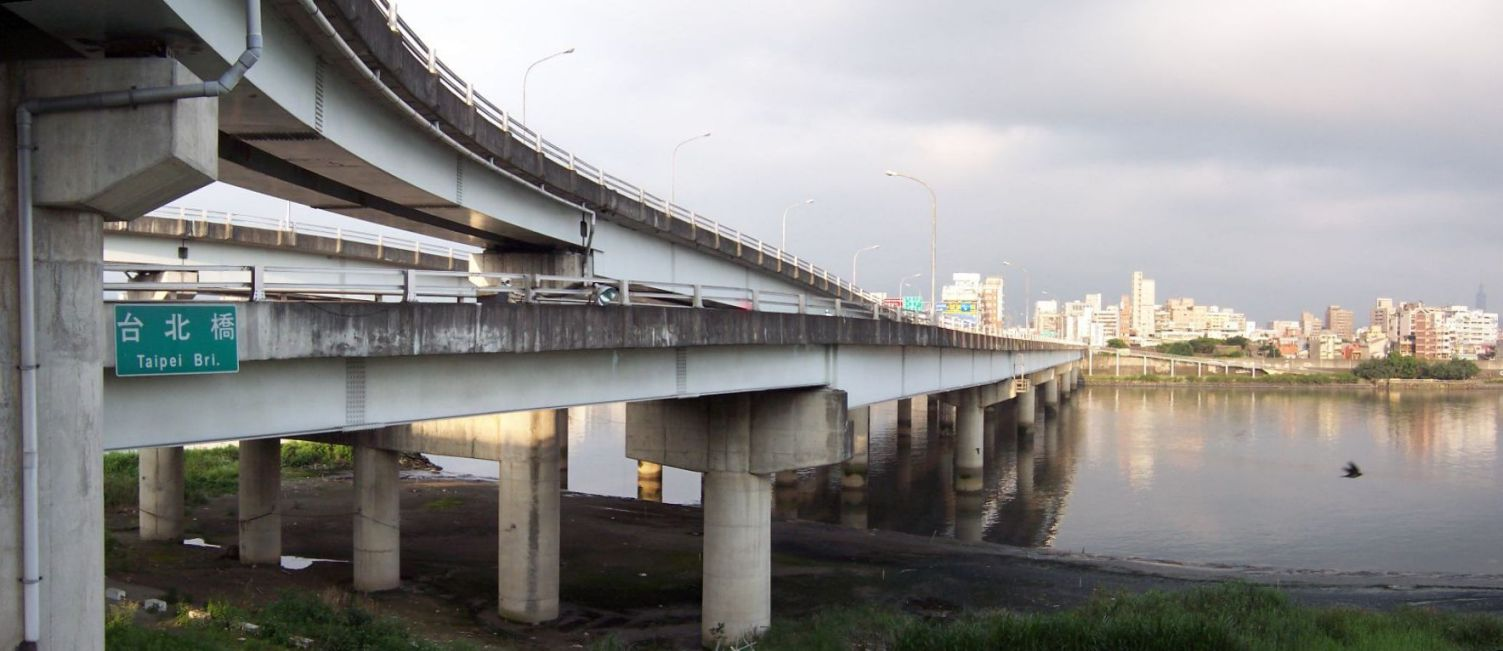
Taipei Bridge seen from Sanchong in 2008
The lower bridge is the eastbound motorcycle/bicycle/pedestrian bridge and the upper one is an entrance ramp from Huánhé Road (環河南路)

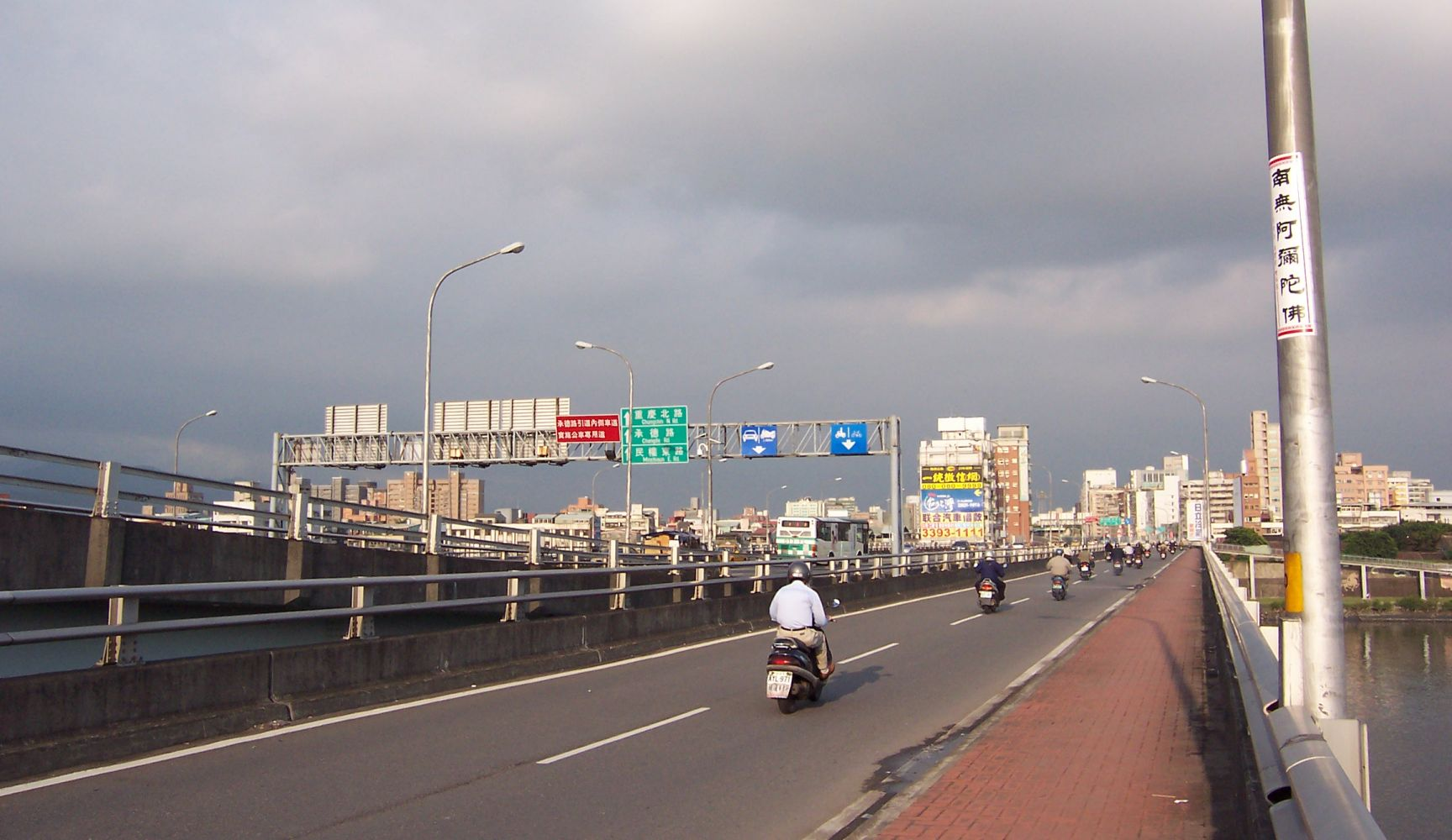
The eastbound motorcycle/bicycle/pedestrian bridge of Taipei Bridge in 2008

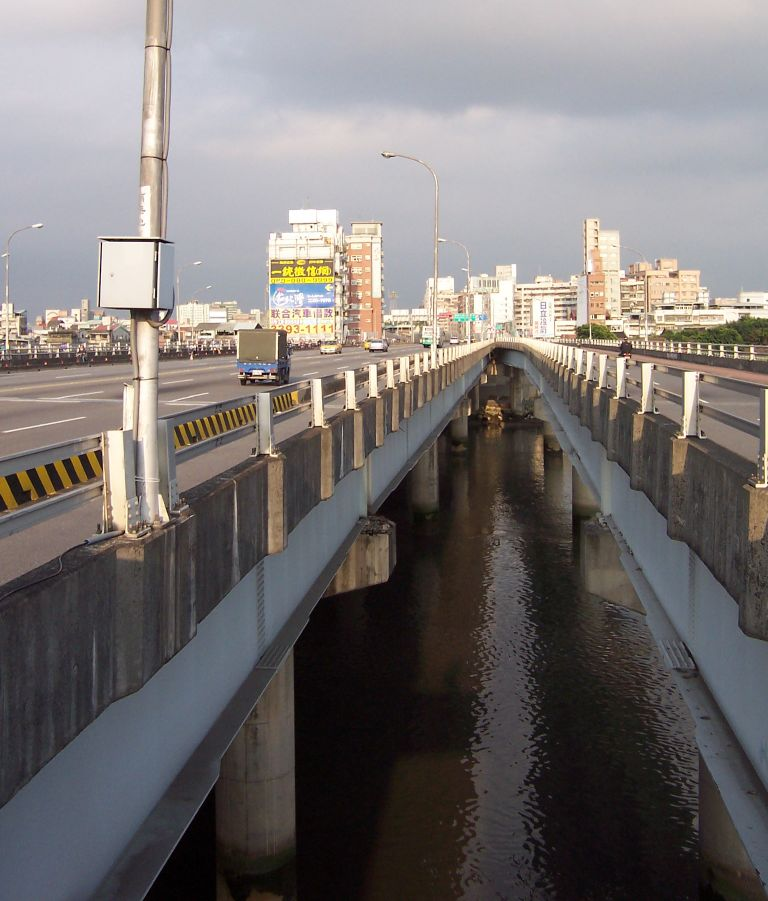
Taipei Bridge in 2008
The eastbound motorcycle/bicycle/pedestrian bridge is to the right and the main automobile bridge is to the left

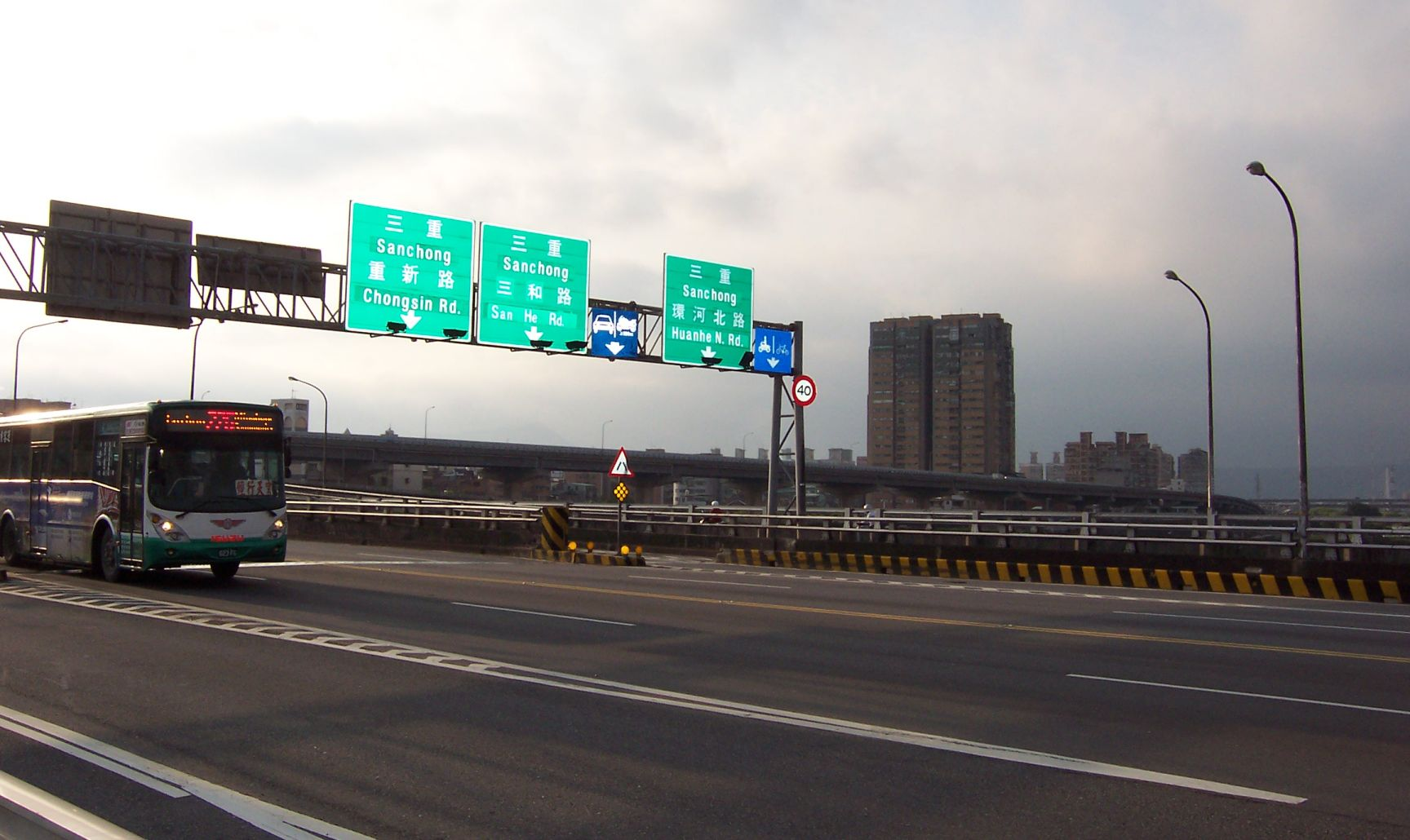
The main Taipei Bridge automobile bridge approaching Sanchong (三重) just before the exit ramp for Huánhé Road (環河北路) in 2008
The bridge in the background above Taipei Bridge is the Huánhé Expressway (環河快速道路)

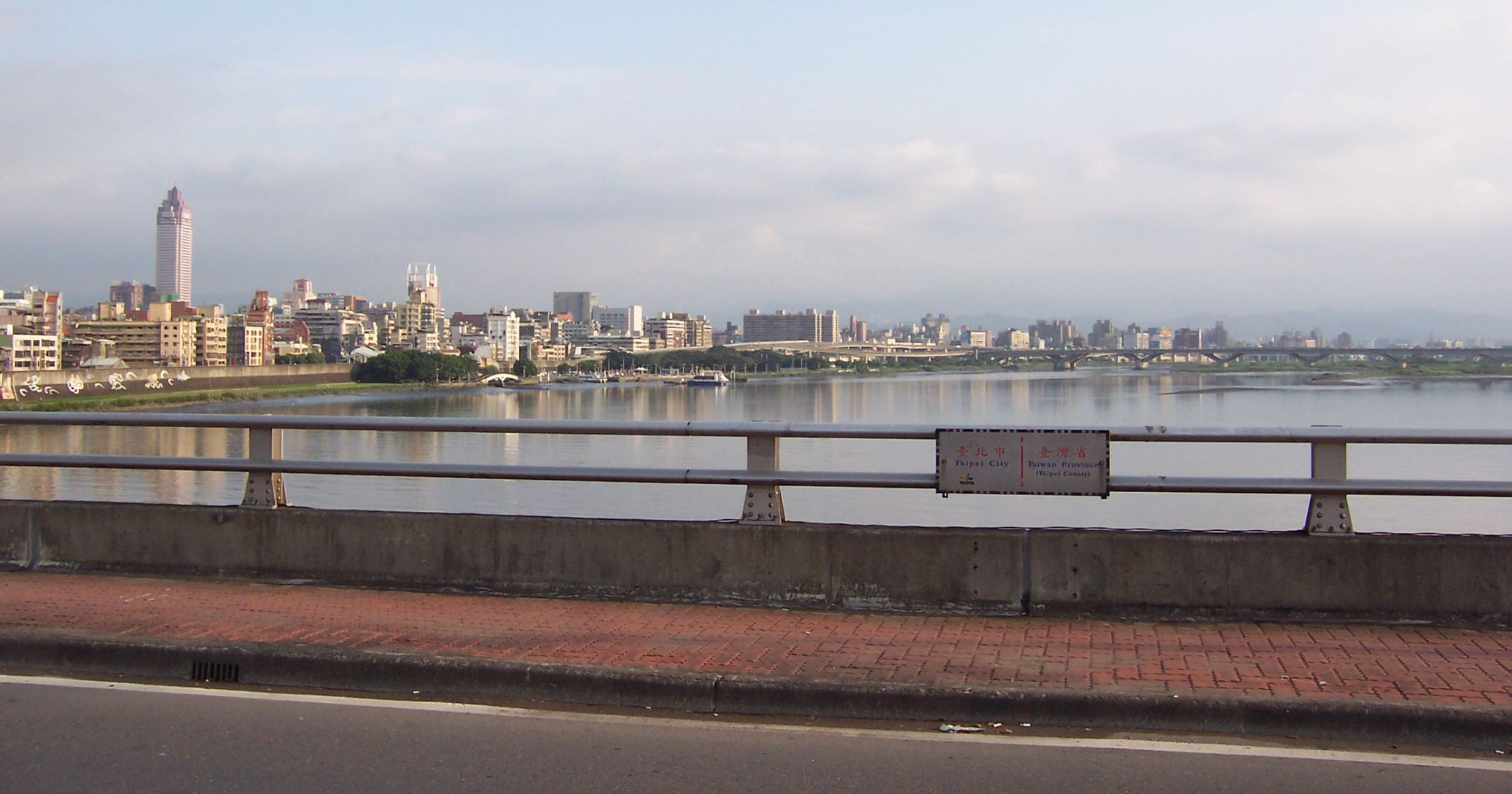
Taipei Bridge in 2008
Photo is of the eastbound motorcycle/bicycle/pedestrian bridge looking south with a sign marking the border between Taipei City, a special municipality, and Taipei County in Taiwan Province (now New Taipei City)

== See also ==
- List of bridges in Taiwan

== Bibliography ==
- Davidson, James W. (1903). The Island of Formosa, Past and Present : history, people, resources, and commercial prospects : tea, camphor, sugar, gold, coal, sulphur, economical plants, and other productions. London and New York: Macmillan. OCLC 1887893. OL 6931635M.
