= Nanjing Fuxing metro station =

Metro station in Taipei, Taiwan

Nanjing Fuxing / 南京復興
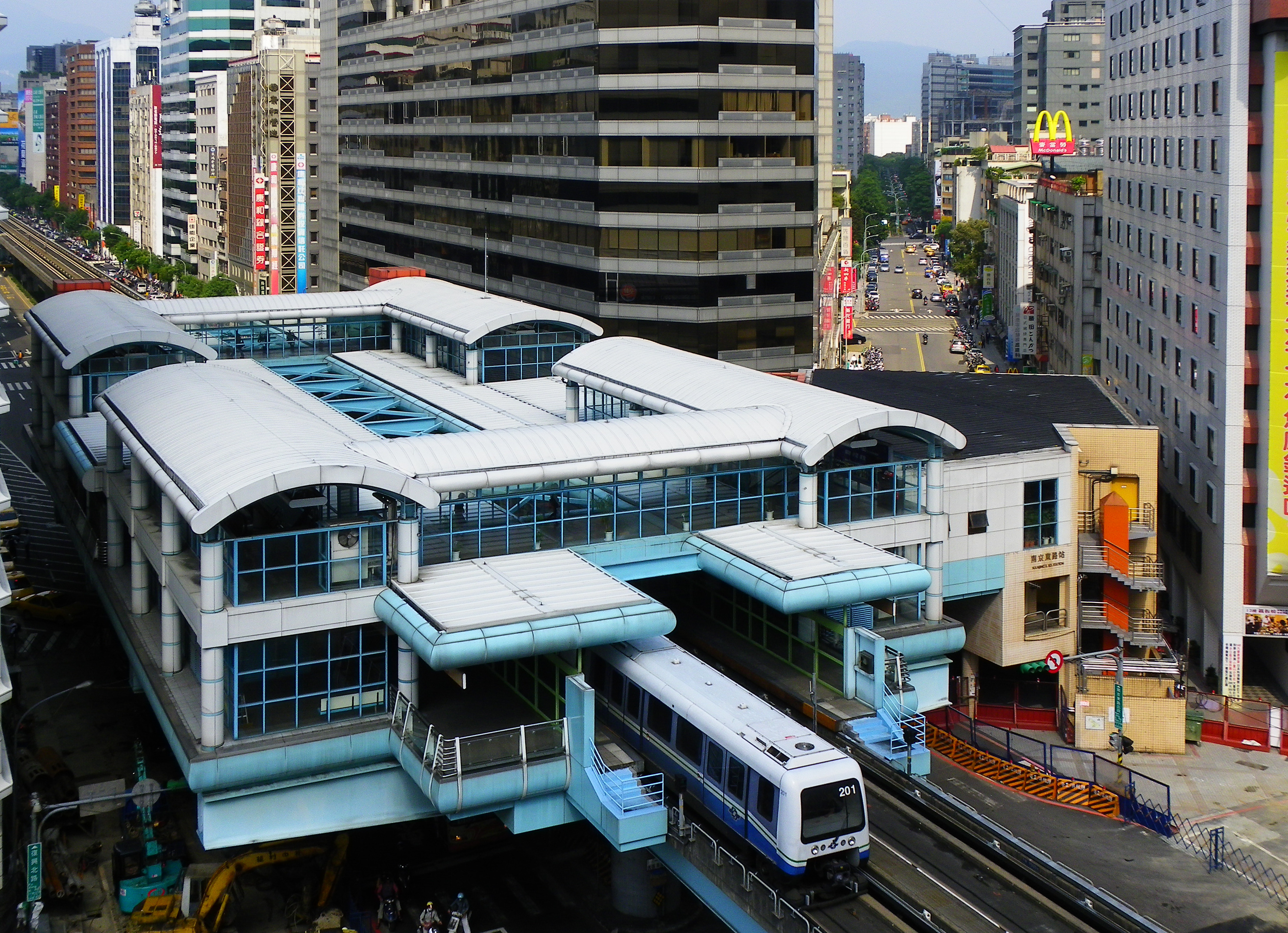
- Wenhu line exterior

Chinese name
- Traditional Chinese: 南京復興
- Simplified Chinese: 南京复兴
Transcriptions
Standard Mandarin
- Hanyu Pinyin: Nánjīng Fùxīng
- Bopomofo: ㄋㄢˊ ㄐㄧㄥ ㄈㄨˋ ㄒㄧㄥ
Hakka
- Pha̍k-fa-sṳ: Nàm-kîn Fu̍k-hîn
Southern Min
- Hokkien POJ: Lâm-kiaⁿ Ho̍k-heng
- Tâi-lô: Lâm-kiann Ho̍k-hing

General information
- Location: 253 Sec 3 Nanjing E Rd; Zhongshan and Songshan Districts, Taipei; Taiwan
- Coordinates: 25.0519°N 121.5440°E
- System: Taipei Metro station
- Lines: Wenhu line Songshan–Xindian line

Construction
- Structure type: Elevated (BR); Underground (G)
- Cycle facilities: No access

Other information
- Station code: ,
- Website: web.metro.taipei/e/stationdetail2010.asp?ID=G16+BR11-009

History
- Opened: 28 March 1996; 30 years ago
- Former names: Nanjing East Road

Key dates
- 15 November 2014: Songshan–Xindian line added

Passengers
- 2017: 24.320 million per year ▲4.89%
- Rank: 71 out of 108 and 5 others, and 5 others

Services
Preceding station	Taipei Metro	Following station
Zhongxiao Fuxing towards Taipei Zoo	Wenhu line	Zhongshan Junior High School towards Nangang Exhib Center
Taipei Arena towards Songshan	Songshan–Xindian line	Songjiang Nanjing towards Taipower Building or Xindian
Location

Nanjing Fuxing (Chinese: 南京復興; pinyin: Nánjīng Fùxīng) is a metro station in Taipei, Taiwan served by the Taipei Metro. It is a transfer station between the Wenhu line and Songshan–Xindian line. Formerly Nanking East Road (from 1996 until 2003) and Nanjing East Road (from 2003 until 2014), it was renamed on 15 November 2014 to avoid confusion since the Green line runs almost entirely under Nanjing East Road.

== Station overview ==
The station is located at the intersection of Fuxing North Rd. and Nanjing East Rd. It has two side platforms (Brown line), one island platform (Green line), and eight exits. All platforms are equipped with platform screen doors, three of which are wheelchair-accessible. This station connects to Taipei Arena, China Airlines Headquarters, Taipei Cultural Center and Taipei Municipal Stadium.

The Green line station is a three-level, underground station underneath Nanjing East Rd. Excavation depth is 25 meters, while the station is 240 meters long and 22 meters wide. Seven additional exits have been added along with the completion of the Green line.

=== Public art ===
The Green line station has a theme of "Reflective Mosaic of Light". The focus is on variations of light and shadow, and turns the station into a miniature art museum with artworks in every corner.

== Station layout ==
4F	Connecting level	Platforms-connecting overpass
3F	Concourse
3F	Concourse	Lobby, information desk, automatic ticket dispensing machines, one-way faregates, restrooms
3F	Side platform, doors will open on the right
3F	Platform 1	← Wenhu line toward Taipei Nangang Exhibition Center (BR12 Zhongshan Junior High School)
3F	Platform 2	→ Wenhu line toward Taipei Zoo (BR10 Zhongxiao Fuxing) →
3F	Side platform, doors will open on the right
1F	Street level	Entrance/exit, connecting level
B2	Concourse	Lobby, information desk, automatic ticket dispensing machines, one-way faregates
B3	Platform 1	← Songshan–Xindian line toward Songshan (G17 Taipei Arena)
B3	Island platform, doors will open on the left
B3	Platform 2	→ Songshan–Xindian line toward Xindian / Taipower Building (G15 Songjiang Nanjing) →

== Around the station ==
- Bureau of Energy
- Japan–Taiwan Exchange Association
  - Japanese Cultural Center
- Liaoning Street Night Market
- Changchun Market
