= Guting metro station =

Metro station in Taipei, Taiwan

Guting / 古亭
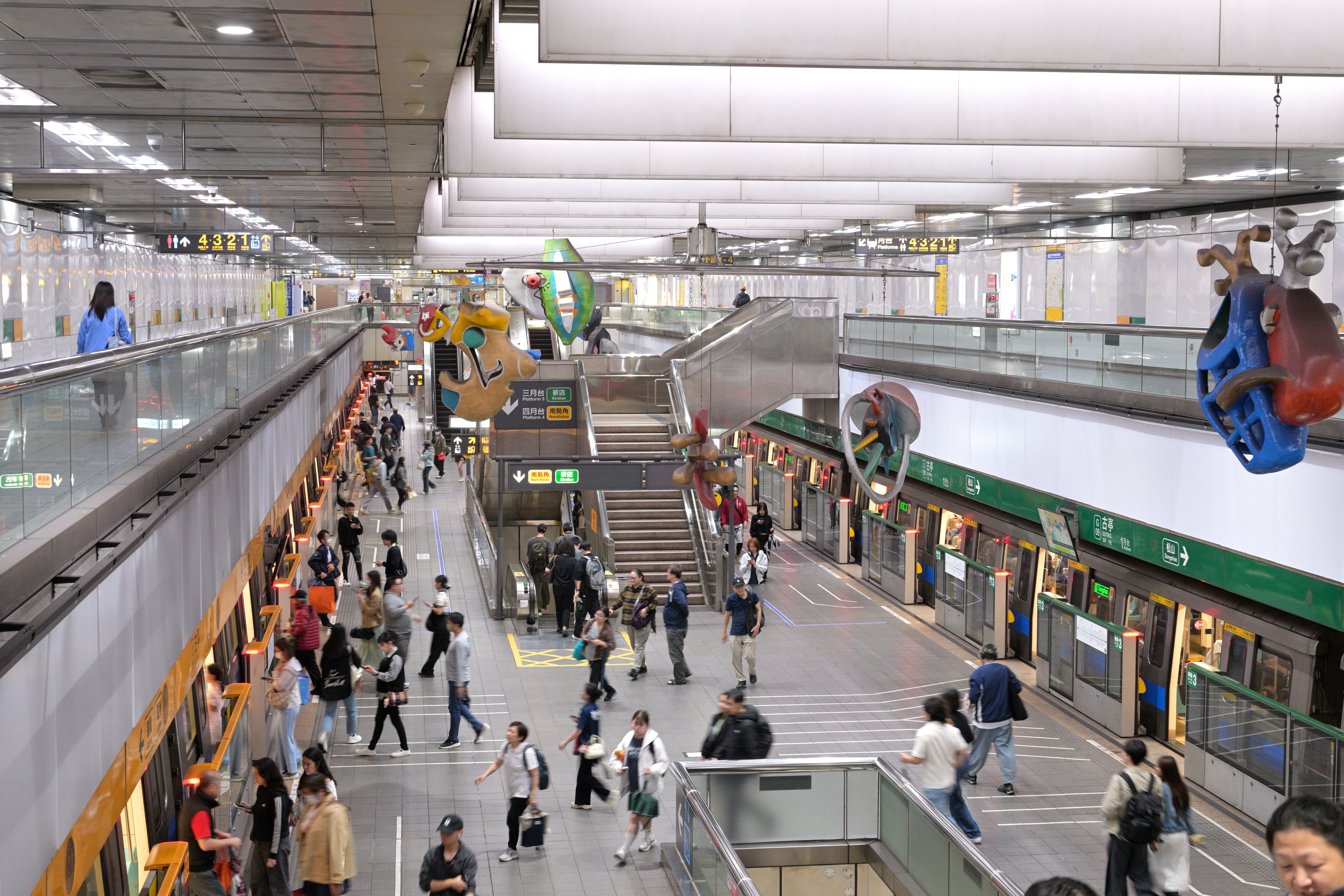
- Platform

Chinese name
- Chinese: 古亭
- Literal meaning: Ancient pavilion
Transcriptions
Standard Mandarin
- Hanyu Pinyin: Gǔtíng
- Bopomofo: ㄍㄨˇ ㄊㄧㄥˊ
- Wade–Giles: Ku³-ting²
Hakka
- Pha̍k-fa-sṳ: Kú-thìn
Southern Min
- Tâi-lô: Kóo-t'îng

General information
- Location: B1F 164-1 Sec 2 Roosevelt Rd; Zhongzheng and Da'an, Taipei; Taiwan
- Coordinates: 25.0266°N 121.5228°E
- System: Taipei metro station
- Lines: Songshan–Xindian line Zhonghe–Xinlu line

Construction
- Structure type: Underground
- Cycle facilities: Access available

Other information
- Station code: ,
- Website: web.metro.taipei/e/stationdetail2010.asp?ID=G09+O05-041

History
- Opened: 24 December 1998

Key dates
- 11 November 1999: Service to Xindian added
- 30 September 2012: Zhonghe–Xinlu line added
- 15 November 2014: Songshan–Xindian line added

Passengers
- 2017: 21.956 million per year ▼2.01%
- Rank: (Ranked 16 of 119)

Services
Preceding station	Taipei Metro	Following station
CKS Memorial Hall towards Songshan	Songshan–Xindian line	Taipower Building Terminus
CKS Memorial Hall towards Songshan	Songshan–Xindian line	Taipower Building towards Xindian
Dingxi towards Nanshijiao	Zhonghe–Xinlu line	Dongmen towards Huilong or Luzhou
Location

Guting (Chinese: 古亭, formerly transliterated as Kuting Station until 2003) is a metro station in Taipei, Taiwan served by Taipei Metro. It is a transfer station between the Songshan–Xindian line and Zhonghe–Xinlu line. The defunct Hsintien line also had a station of the same name. However, its location is not the same as the current station.

== Station overview ==
The station is a three-level, underground structure with two island platforms and nine exits. The two platforms are stacked, allowing for cross-platform interchange between the Songshan–Xindian line and the Zhonghe–Xinlu line.

== Public art ==
Public art at the station is titled "Chance of Meeting" and features 12 face masks representing contrasts such as day and night, noisy and quiet, and time and space. It was selected by international competition and cost NT$4,999,000.

== Station layout ==
Street level	Street level	Exit/entrance
B1	Concourse	Lobby, toilets, one-way ticket machine, information desk
B2	Platform 1	Songshan–Xindian line toward Songshan (G10 Chiang Kai-shek Memorial Hall) →
B2	Island platform, doors will open on the right for Songshan-Xindian Line, left for Zhonghe-Xinlu Line
B2	Platform 2	Zhonghe–Xinlu line toward Luzhou / Huilong (O06 Dongmen) →
B3	Platform 3	← Songshan–Xindian line toward Xindian / Taipower Building (G08 Taipower Building)
B3	Island platform, doors will open on the left for Songshan-Xindian Line, right for Zhonghe-Xinlu Line
B3	Platform 4	← Zhonghe–Xinlu line toward Nanshijiao (O04 Dingxi)

== Around the station ==
- Leputing
- National Taiwan Normal University
- Taiwan Academy of Banking and Finance
- Thome Courtyard

== See also ==
- List of railway stations in Taiwan
