= Taipei Arena metro station =

Metro station in Songshan, Taipei, Taiwan

Taipei Arena 台北小巨蛋
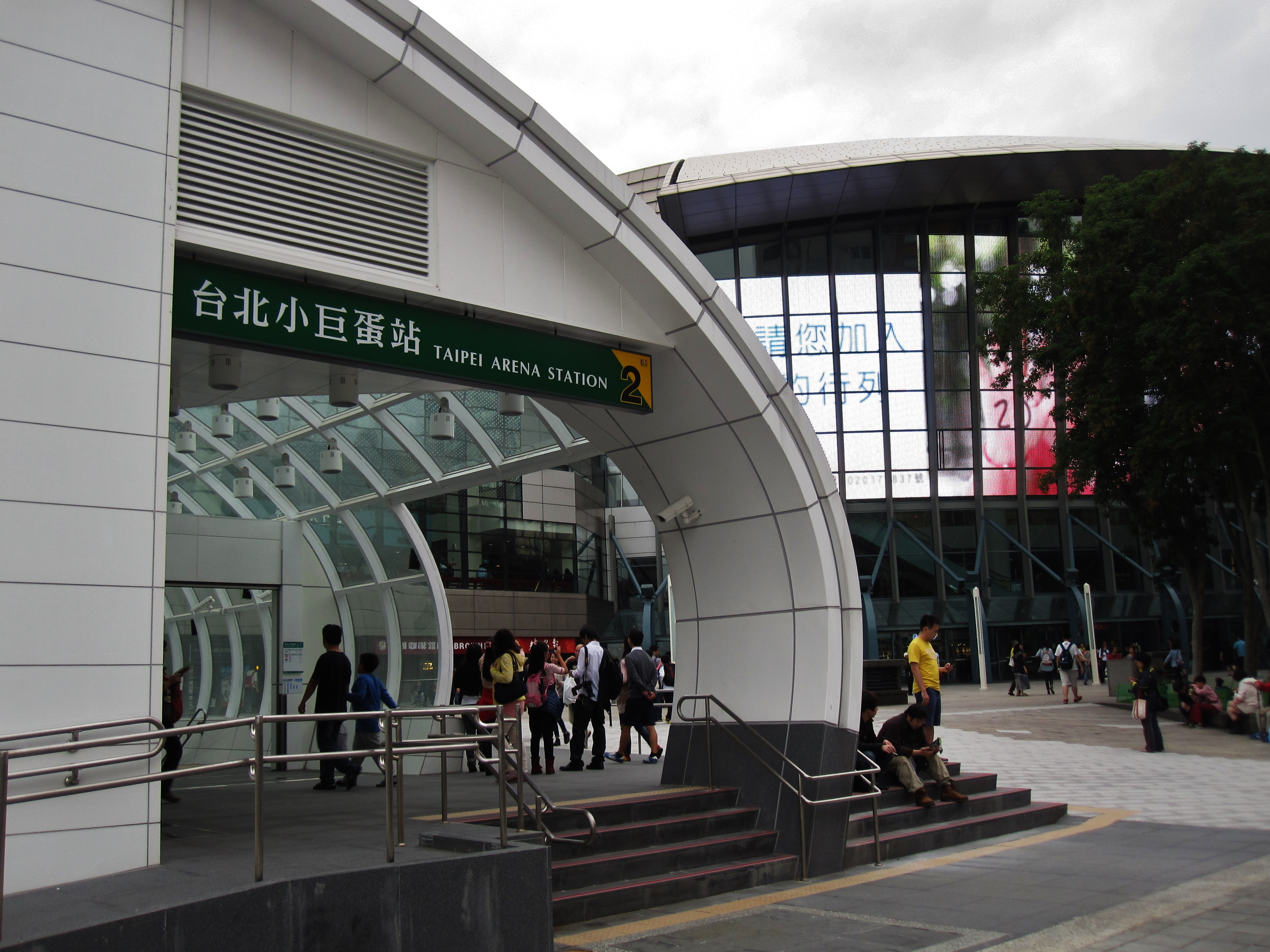

Chinese name
- Chinese: 台北小巨蛋
Transcriptions
Standard Mandarin
- Hanyu Pinyin: Táiběi Xiǎojùdàn
- Bopomofo: ㄊㄞˊ ㄅㄟˇ ㄒㄧㄠˇ ㄐㄩˋ ㄉㄢˋ
Hakka
- Pha̍k-fa-sṳ: Thòi-pet Seú-ki-thàn
Southern Min
- Hokkien POJ: Tâi-pak Sió-kū-tàn
- Tâi-lô: Tâi-pak Sió-kū-tàn

General information
- Location: 10-1 Sec 4 Nanjing E Rd; Songshan District, Taipei; Taiwan
- Coordinates: 25.0517°N 121.5519°E
- System: Taipei Metro station
- Line: Songshan–Xindian line

Construction
- Structure type: Underground
- Cycle facilities: Access available

Other information
- Station code: G17
- Website: web.metro.taipei/e/stationdetail2010.asp?ID=G17-109

History
- Opened: 15 November 2014; 11 years ago

Passengers
- 2017: 15.921 million per year ▲6.9%
- Rank: (Ranked 42 of 119)

Services
Preceding station	Taipei Metro	Following station
Nanjing Sanmin towards Songshan	Songshan–Xindian line	Nanjing Fuxing towards Taipower Building or Xindian
Location

Taipei Arena (Chinese: 台北小巨蛋; pinyin: Táiběi Xiǎojùdàn) is a metro station in Taipei, Taiwan served by Taipei Metro. It is a station on Songshan–Xindian line. It opened on 15 November 2014.

== Station overview ==
This three-level, underground station has an island platform. It is located beneath Nanjing East Rd. to the west of Beining Rd. It opened in November 2014 with the opening of the Songshan line.

Originally, the station was to be named "Taipei Stadium station". However, the area was renamed to "Taipei City Sports Park", no longer using the original station name. Thus, on 22 July 2011, the Department of Rapid Transit Systems announced that the station would be renamed to Taipei Arena station, using Taipei Arena to signify the park.

=== Construction ===
Excavation depth for this station is around 26 m (85 ft). It is 219 m (719 ft) in length and 21 m (69 ft) wide. It has five exits, two vent shafts, and two accessibility elevators.

=== Public art ===
The theme for this station is "Energy, Movement, Light, Tracks". The design aims to reflect the station's liveliness, spirit, and power. It has public art designs.

== Station layout ==
Street level	Exit	Taipei Arena
B1	Concourse	Lobby, information desk, automatic ticket dispensing machines, one-way faregates
B1	Concourse	Restrooms
B2	Platform 1	← Songshan–Xindian line toward Songshan (G18 Nanjing Sanmin)
B2	Island platform, doors will open on the left
B2	Platform 2	→ Songshan–Xindian line toward Xindian / Taipower Building (G16 Nanjing Fuxing) →

== Around the station ==
- Taipei Arena
- Land Reform Museum
