= Nanjing Sanmin metro station =

Metro station in Songshan, Taipei, Taiwan

Nanjing Sanmin 南京三民
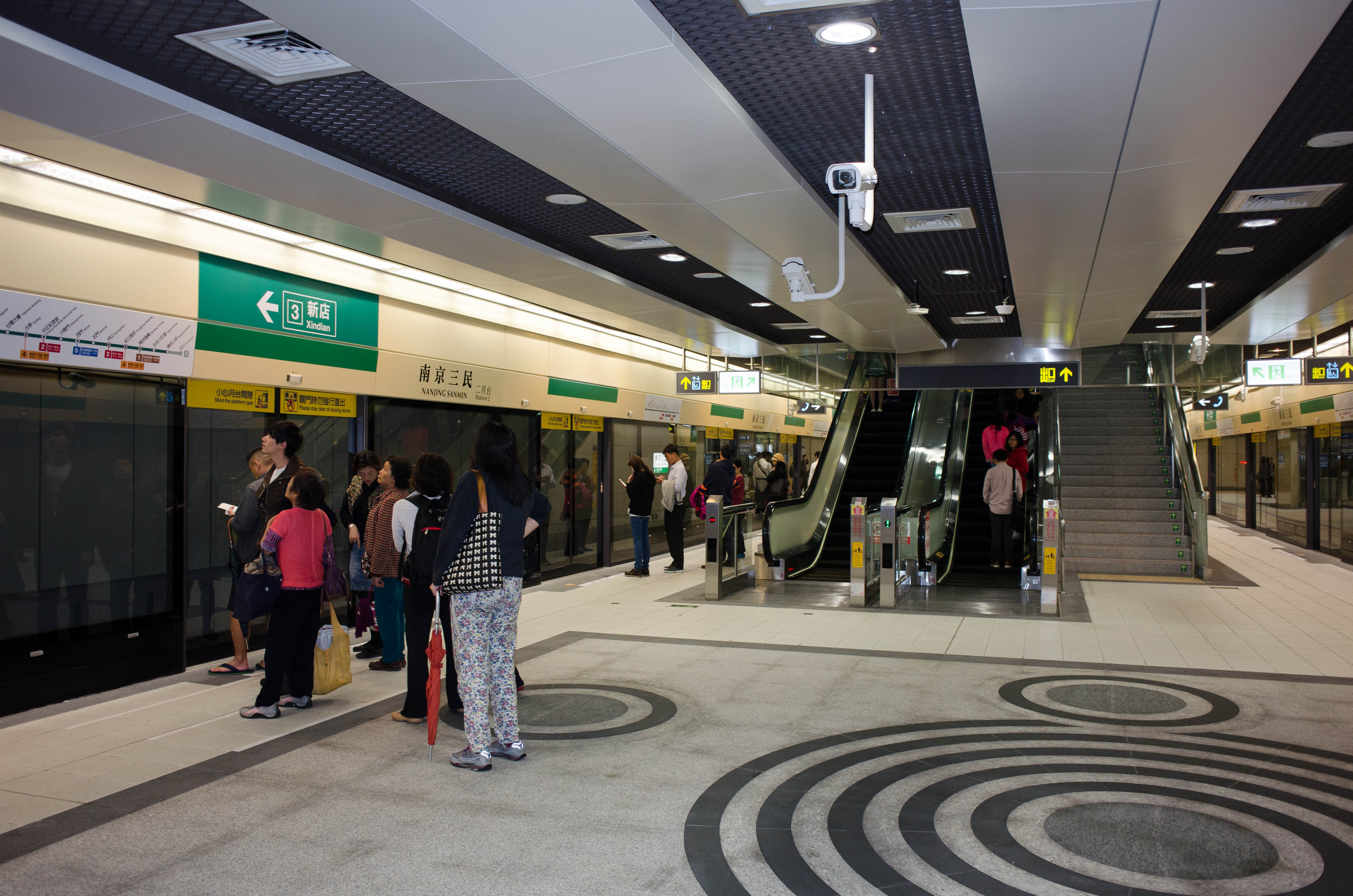
- Platform

Chinese name
- Chinese: 南京三民
Transcriptions
Standard Mandarin
- Hanyu Pinyin: Nánjīng Sānmín
- Bopomofo: ㄋㄢˊ ㄐㄧㄥ ㄙㄢ ㄇㄧㄣˊ ㄓㄢˋ
Hakka
- Pha̍k-fa-sṳ: Nàm-kîn Sâm-mìn
Southern Min
- Tâi-lô: Lâm-kiann-sam-bîn

General information
- Location: 237 Sec 5 Nanjing E Rd; Songshan District, Taipei; Taiwan
- Coordinates: 25.0514°N 121.5639°E
- System: Taipei Metro station
- Line: Songshan–Xindian line

Construction
- Structure type: Underground
- Cycle facilities: Access available

Other information
- Station code: G18
- Website: web.metro.taipei/e/stationdetail2010.asp?ID=G18-110

History
- Opened: 15 November 2014; 11 years ago

Passengers
- 2017: 15.510 million per year ▲6.76%
- Rank: (Ranked 38 of 119)

Services
Preceding station	Taipei Metro	Following station
Songshan Terminus	Songshan–Xindian line	Taipei Arena towards Taipower Building or Xindian
Location

Nanjing Sanmin (Chinese: 南京三民; pinyin: Nánjīng Sānmín) is a metro station in Taipei, Taiwan served by Taipei Metro. It is a station on the Songshan–Xindian line.

== Station overview ==
This two-level, underground station has an island platform. It is located beneath Nanjing East Rd. at its intersection with Sanmin Rd. It opened in November 2014 with the opening of the Songshan Line.

=== Construction ===
Excavation depth for this station is around 20 m (66 ft). It is 235 m (771 ft) in length and 27 m (89 ft) wide. It has four exits, two vent shafts, and two accessibility elevators.

=== Public art ===
The theme for this station is "Gate of the City". The station represents the intersection of four developing regions of the city, all at different stages. Each exit has a gate leading to a different corner of the city. The entrance is a "Porch of Community".

== Station layout ==
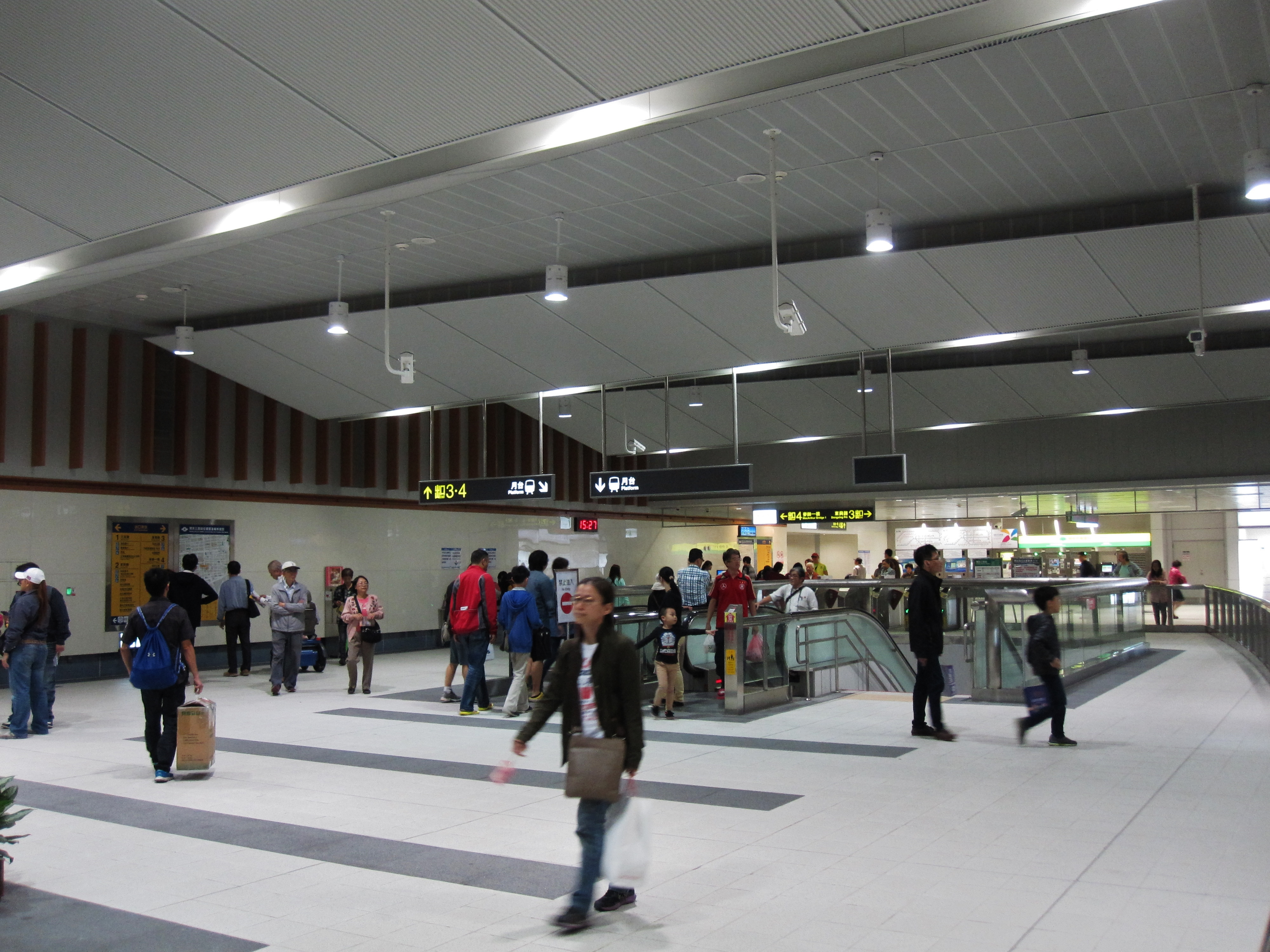
Station concourse

Street level	Entrance/exit	Entrance/exit
B1	Concourse	Lobby, information desk, automatic ticket dispensing machines, one-way faregates
B1	Concourse	Restrooms
B2	Platform 1	← Songshan–Xindian line toward Songshan (G19 Terminus)
B2	Island platform, doors will open on the left
B2	Platform 2	→ Songshan–Xindian line toward Xindian / Taipower Building (G17 Taipei Arena) →

== Around the station ==
- Puppetry Art Center of Taipei
- Taipei Railway Workshop
