= Lee Tzu-Tung =

Taiwanese artist and director

- 李紫彤
- Born: Taiwan
- Education: National Taiwan University (BA); School of Art Institute of Chicago (MFA); Massachusetts Institute of Technology (MS)
- Occupations: Artist, Director
- Notable work: Wave, #GhostKeepers, Writing the Time Lag, Positive Coin, Forkonomy( )
- Website: www.tzutung.com

Lee Tzu-Tung (traditional Chinese: 李紫彤) is a Taiwanese artist and director who focuses on political issues such as gender, Indigenous rights, the White Terror, and national identity. Her creative works are primarily multimedia-based participatory art projects.

== Biography ==
=== Early career ===
During her university years, Lee Tzu Tung collaborated with friends to create "Embrace," which won the First Prize in the 2010 National Taiwan University Film Festival. One of the filming locations was the NTU Building affectionately known as "Dong Dong Guan" (literally, Hole Hole Hall). They captured this artistic film in conjunction with the building's demolition project at the time.

=== 2013–2019 ===
In 2018, sponsored by the Ministry of Culture of Taiwan and in collaboration with the Taipei Cultural Center in New York and Residency Unlimited (RU), Lee Tzu-Tung and Liu Ren-Kai were selected as resident artists for the "2018 Residency Program at Residency Unlimited (RU)." They embarked on a four-month artistic journey in New York, culminating in the presentation of their creative work, "The Impossibility of Form," in September 2018. The exhibition piece, "#GhostKeepers", is a participatory art that invites individuals to share the underrepresented stories of people who died due to political violence. It then gathers a group of "Ghostkeepers"—a group of writers from various corners of the world to create social media avatars of these “ghosts”, simulating the digital resurrection of the spirits. #Ghostkeepers intends to experiment with the process to foster cross-generational, cross-culture empathy.

The experimental ethnography, "Writing the Time Lag," is a feature film that was initiated in 2014. It was exhibited at MOCA Taipei in 2019 and at the Anthropology and the Arts Network (ANTART) at the University of Lisbon in 2020. The film explores issues related the intersection between Indigenous, gender and national identity. During this period, the artist served in various political groups such as the Formosan Association for Public Affairs, New Power Party, Democratic Progressive Party to closely observing their political events. The film also embarked on various artistic experiments. This included challenging gender norms in the film industry, with the entire crew of "Writing the Time Lag" being women or queer. Furthermore, it adopted a participatory filmmaking approach where the interviewees themselves were involved as filmmakers.

In 2019, Lee Tzu Tung created a transactional art piece "Positive Coin," which aimed to challenge the AIDS stigma. It analogizes the circulation of disease with currency trading. As “Positive” refers to HIV positive, and how HIV-positive people can bring positive meaning to the disease, the Positive Coin monetary system is designed to promote AIDS identity, and reflect the national disease control and surveillance system. The project also included with an art auction using Positive Coin, while all proceeds were donated to AIDS-related NGOs, including the Persons with HIV/AIDS Rights Advocacy Association of Taiwan (PRAA), Taiwan HivStory Association, and Taiwan Tongzhi Hotline (LGBTQ+) Association.

=== 2019–present ===
In 2020, Lee Tzu Tung started a project called "Forkonomy()" with Hong Kong artist Winnie Soon. It began as a contract workshop at Taiwan’s C-LAB, in which artists brought together policymakers, scholars, marine life conservators, cultural workers, artists, and activists to consider one question: “How do we buy, own, and mint one milliliter of the South China Sea?” and draft an ownership contract together. The workshop participants then decided that one milliliter of the South China Sea should be co-owned with the set price of 1.61 TWD (New Taiwan Dollars)/ml. As part of the association, each participant agreed to take ecological and economic responsibility for the South China Sea collectively and cooperatively. The project also employs free and open-source software and decentralized protocols.
