= C-Lab =

C-Lab or C-LAB may refer to:

- A software product of Emagic, a former company in Rellingen, Germany
- Taiwan Contemporary Culture Lab, a cultural center in Taipei, Taiwan
- Columbia Laboratory for Architectural Broadcasting, a research lab at Columbia University
- Colorado Education Work Lab, an association at Colorado Department of Higher Education
- Formerly Radio Campus Rennes (French: C-Lab), a local community radio station based in Rennes
