= 2016 Taiwan Railways bombing =

Railway incident in Taiwan

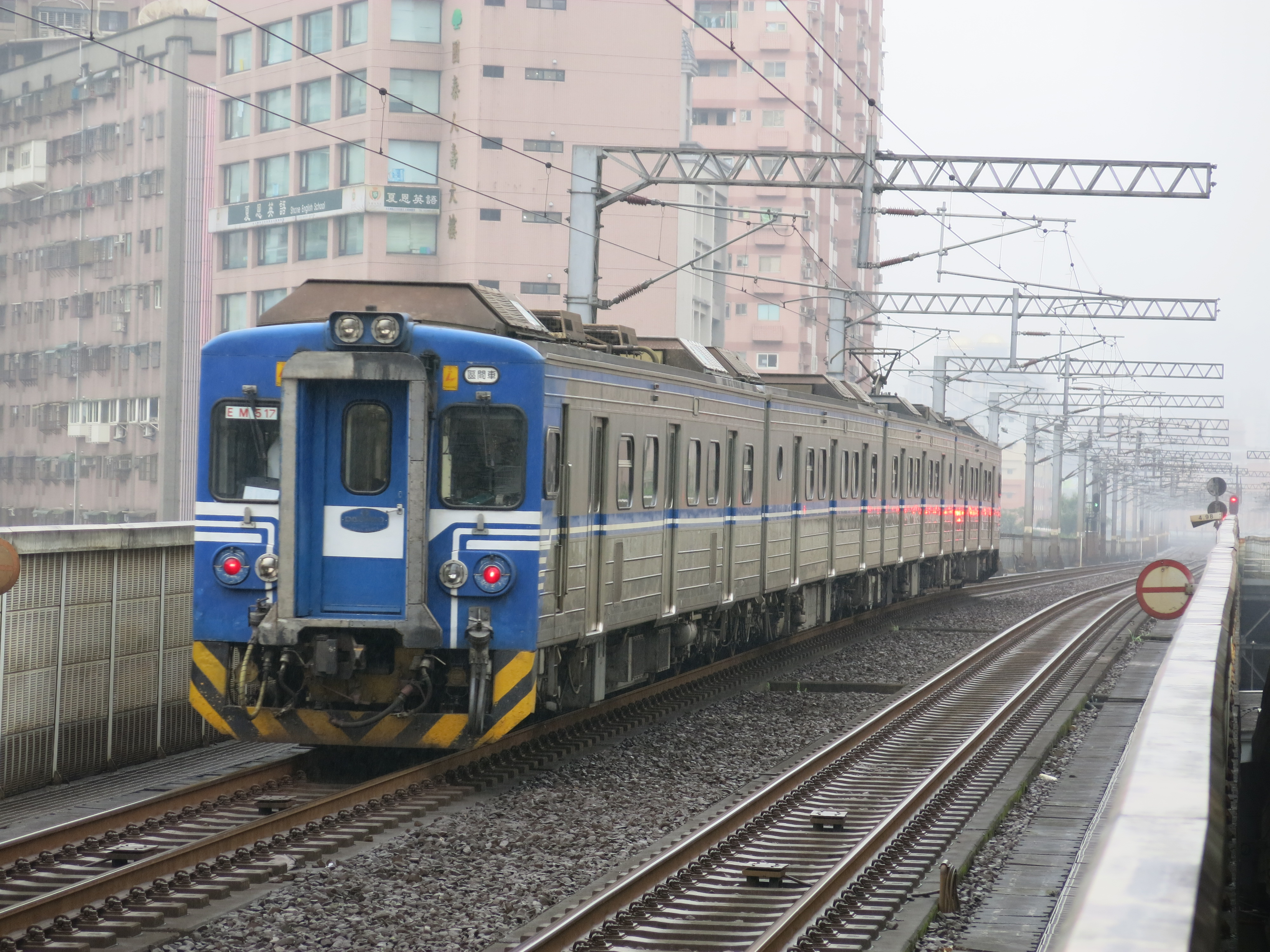
- A Taiwan Railways EMU500 series train, similar to the one involved in the bombing
- Location: Songshan station, Xinyi District, Taipei, Taiwan
- Date: 7 July 2016, 22:00 NST (UTC+8)
- Target: Train No. 1258 of the Taiwan Railways Administration
- Injuries: 25 (13 males, 12 females, including the perpetrator)
- Perpetrator: Lin Ying-chang
- Motive: Despair over prolonged illness; suicide

The 2016 Taiwan Railways bombing, also known as the TRA Train No. 1258 bombing or the Songshan Station bombing, was a railway security incident in Taiwan. Officially referred to as the Taiwan Railways Administration Hsinchu–Keelung Train No. 1258 bombing, the attack occurred at approximately 10:00 p.m. on 7 July 2016, when an explosive device placed in the sixth car of Taiwan Railways Administration (TRA) Train No. 1258 detonated as the train was approaching Songshan Station. The explosion injured 25 passengers. Investigators later determined that the perpetrator was Lin Ying-chang, who had also been on board the train.

== Incident ==
The train involved was TRA local Train No. 1258 from Hsinchu to Keelung, consisting of EMU509 and EMU504 sets. It departed Taipei Station at 9:52 p.m. and was scheduled to arrive at Songshan Station at 9:59 p.m. While traveling between kilometer markers 24 and 25, a black piece of luggage placed on the overhead rack in car EP509 (the sixth car) suddenly exploded. Twenty-five passengers were injured, several of them seriously. After the train arrived at Songshan Station, the fire was quickly extinguished.The Taipei City Fire Department dispatched multiple fire engines and ambulances to the scene to conduct rescue operations.

== Casualties ==
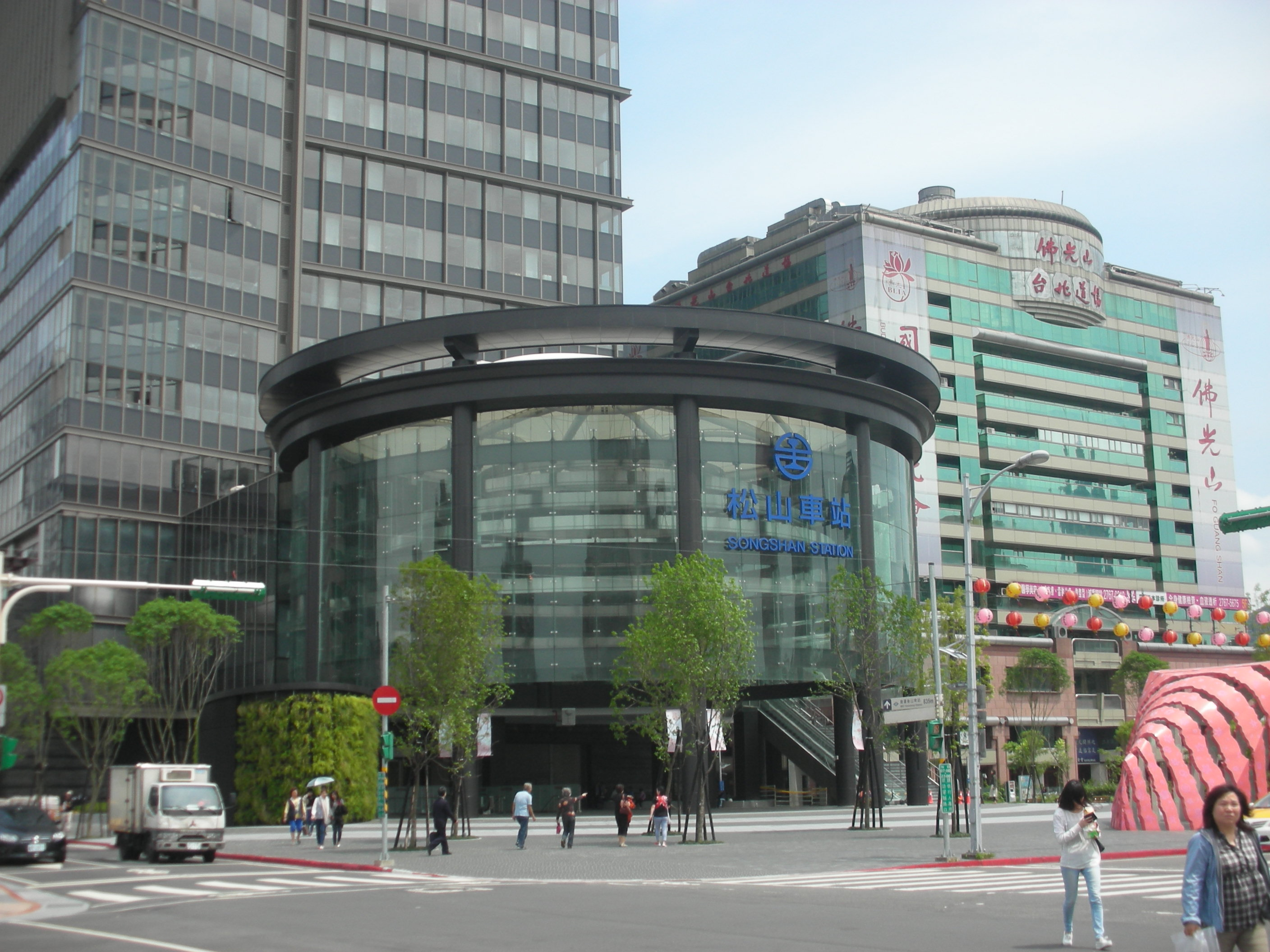
The incident took place at TRA Songshan Station.

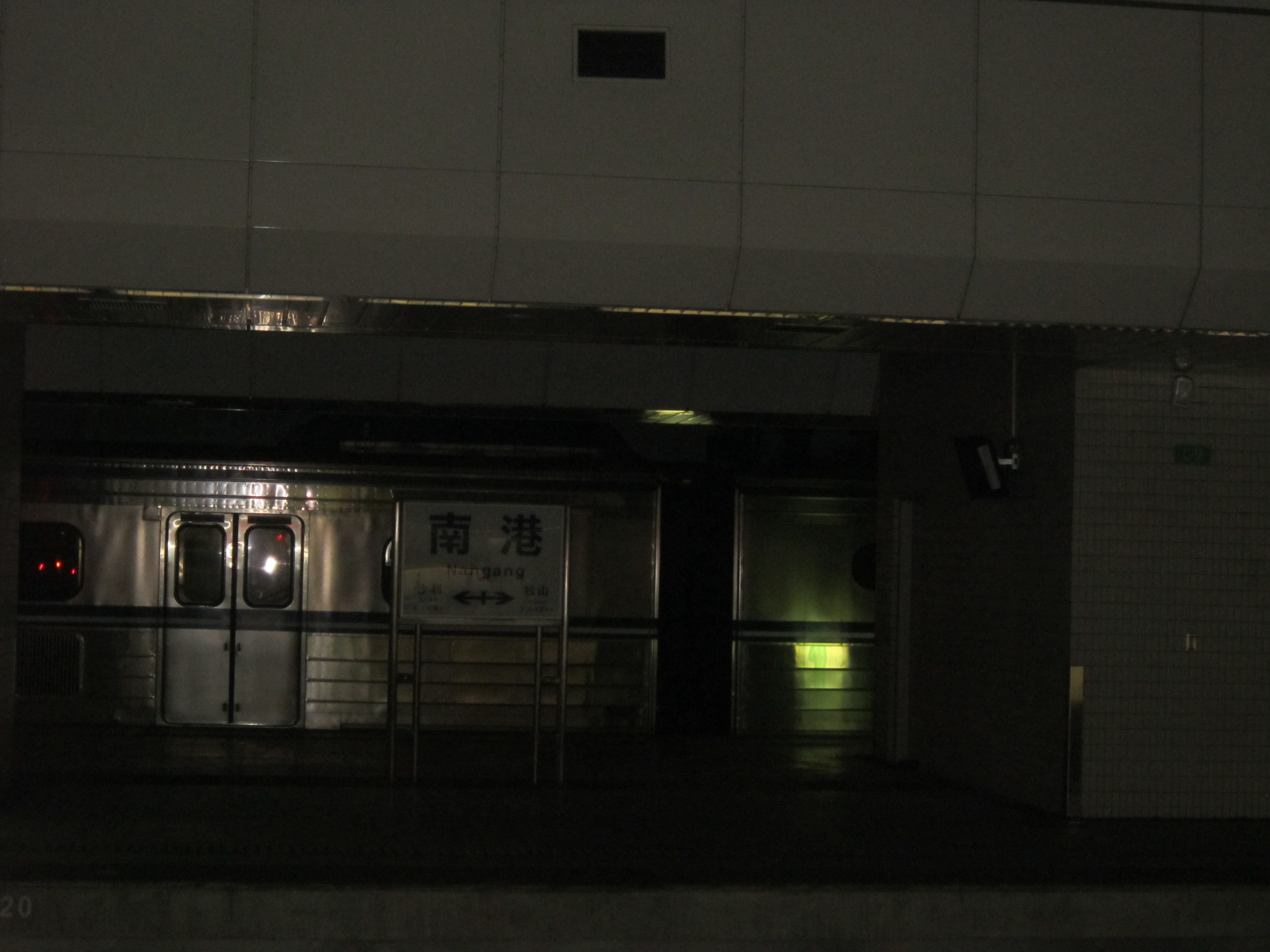
The EMU500 train involved in the incident (Train No. 1258) has been temporarily parked alongside the unused Platform 3 at Nangang Station.

According to the Taipei City Fire Department, 25 people—13 men and 12 women—were injured. They were transported to various hospitals, including Taipei City Hospital Zhongxiao Branch (six patients), Taipei Medical University Hospital (five), Cathay General Hospital (two), Tri-Service General Hospital Neihu Branch (four), Tri-Service General Hospital Songshan Branch (five), and Chang Gung Memorial Hospital Taipei (three).

Among the injured were a 38-year-old Vietnamese woman with minor injuries, a 17-year-old male surnamed Lü, a 24-year-old male surnamed Yu, and 55-year-old suspect Lin Ying-chang, who sustained serious injuries.

== Investigation ==
In response to the bombing, the Criminal Investigation Bureau, the Railway Police Bureau, and other agencies formed the "1258 Task Force". Investigators recovered fragments of a firecracker approximately 20 centimeters long and white powder residue at the scene, leading them to suspect that the explosion had been caused by ignited firecracker powder. Authorities initially did not rule out the possibility of a terrorist attack.

Witnesses reported seeing a man in his forties carrying a long object into the carriage, placing an unknown item inside, and then leaving. Other passengers recalled seeing a man pushing a black suitcase into the car before departing. Li Tzu-wen, head of the First Unit of the Fifth Investigation Division of the Criminal Investigation Bureau, stated that investigators had found fragments of a ruptured steel pipe explosive device and a black canvas backpack, which were believed to mark the center of the explosion.

Li further explained that investigators found a broken steel pipe measuring approximately 6 centimeters in width and 15 centimeters in length, along with fragments scattered across the floor. Since no switch mechanism was found, authorities concluded that the device had likely been ignited manually. Damage to the nearby black canvas backpack suggested that the steel pipe bomb had been placed inside it. The Taipei District Prosecutors Office assigned senior prosecutor Teng Chih-ping and his team to investigate the case.

On 8 July, police announced that DNA collected from the train restroom matched that of Lin Ying-chang, one of the seriously injured passengers, who had also been identified by several eyewitnesses.

After fifteen hours of investigation, police concluded that Lin, who remained unconscious due to severe injuries, was the prime suspect. Because he had no fixed residence, investigators searched for his vehicle and discovered a van in Ren'ai Township, Nantou County, on the evening of 8 July. Inside, they found a suicide note left by Lin before the attack, in which he stated that he had suffered from tonsil cancer for many years and had become despondent and suicidal.

On 19 July 2016, a judge ordered Lin detained without restricting visits. During court proceedings, Lin stated that after leaving his dog with the owner of a breakfast shop, he traveled north from Taichung. He originally intended to detonate the bomb at Hsinchu railway station when the crowds were larger but lost his nerve. He eventually boarded a local train to Taipei and carried out the attack in northern Taiwan.

== Response ==
In the early hours following the bombing, Premier of Taiwan Lin Chuan visited hospitals to see the injured and stated that security measures for public transportation systems would be strengthened, urging the public not to panic.The Taipei City Department of Social Welfare also dispatched personnel to hospitals to visit the victims and distributed NT$5,000 in consolation payments to each injured person on behalf of the Taipei City Government.

In the criminal proceedings, the Taipei District Prosecutors Office concluded its investigation on 17 November 2016 and indicted Lin Ying-chang on charges including attempted murder and violations of the Controlling Guns, Ammunition and Knives Act, recommending that he be sentenced to 30 years in prison. On 22 February 2017, the Taipei District Court sentenced Lin to 30 years' imprisonment for attempted murder and manufacturing explosives. On 1 August 2017, the Taiwan High Court reduced the sentence for attempted murder to 19 years and 10 months and imposed an additional sentence of 10 years and 6 months for illegally manufacturing explosives, resulting in a combined sentence of 29 years and 10 months. On 8 November 2017, the Supreme Court of Taiwan sentenced Lin to a total of 30 years and 4 months for attempted murder, including offenses against a child, thereby finalizing the case. Because multiple judgments had been rendered, Lin later petitioned the court to determine a consolidated sentence, which was set at 29 years and 10 months.

In the civil proceedings, on 11 August 2017, the Taipei District Court ordered Lin to pay NT$6,838,505 in damages to Taiwan Railways Administration and the injured passengers. The compensation included NT$1,764,681 for damage to the train carriage, NT$5,915 for ticket refunds and exchanges, NT$390,692 for operational losses resulting from the damaged carriage being taken out of service, and NT$4,672,217 for the medical expenses of the injured passengers.

== Official reactions ==
Presidential Office

Office of the President (Taiwan) spokesman Huang Chung-yuan stated that both the Office of the President and the National Security Council had been informed immediately after the incident and had maintained contact with the Executive Yuan to monitor developments. President of the Republic of China Tsai Ing-wen had also been briefed. The National Security Council continued to track the situation through intelligence collected by the National Security Bureau.

Executive Yuan

Executive Yuan spokesman Tung Chen-yuan stated that the government had already grasped the situation surrounding the explosion. Premier of Taiwan Lin Chuan was deeply concerned and had instructed police and fire authorities to provide immediate rescue and medical assistance, restore transportation services, and conduct a prompt investigation into the case.

Ministry of Transportation and Communications

The Ministry of Transportation and Communications stated that it had immediately instructed the Taiwan Railways Administration and the Taiwan High Speed Rail Engineering Bureau to notify all Taiwan Railways and Taiwan High Speed Rail stations to heighten vigilance and conduct security inspections. The Railway Police Bureau was requested to strengthen security at stations and on trains and to increase patrols for suspicious unattended objects. Airports, ports, and highway bus terminals were also ordered to raise their security alert levels.

Taipei City Government

Mayor of Taipei Ko Wen-je thanked Premier of Taiwan Lin Chuan for promptly visiting the scene and expressed confidence in Taipei City's ability to handle more than twenty casualties through its emergency medical system. He noted that social workers from the Taipei City Government's Department of Social Welfare had been stationed at each hospital to assist patients and their families. Regarding the cause of the explosion, Ko said that conclusions should await the results of the police investigation and urged the public not to engage in excessive speculation.
