= Thome Courtyard =

Art center in Zhongzheng, Taipei, Taiwan

- 東美院
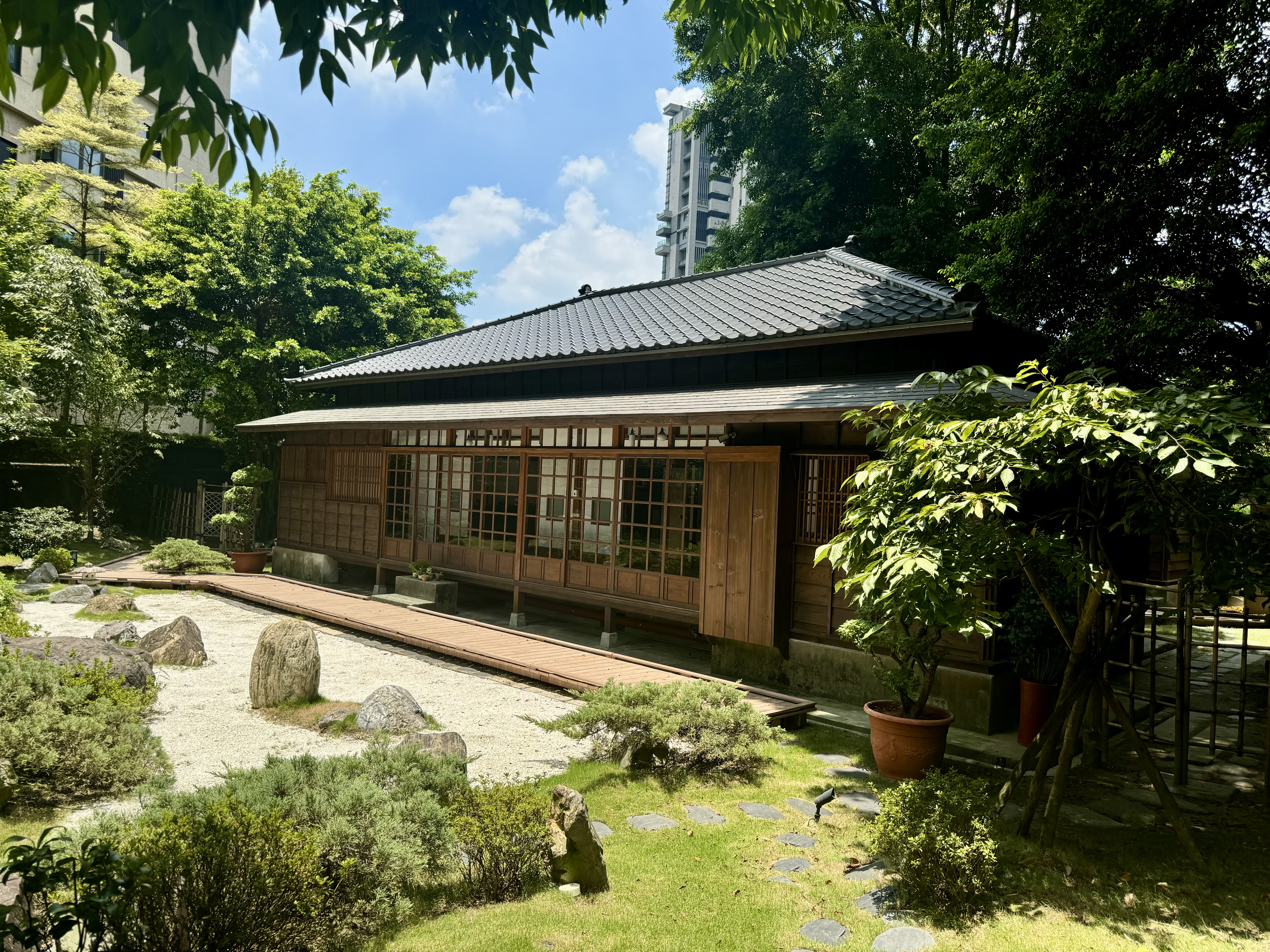
- Interactive map of the Thome Courtyard area

General information
- Type: art center
- Architectural style: Japanese
- Location: Zhongzheng, Taipei, Taiwan
- Coordinates: 25°01′38.8″N 121°31′03.2″E
- Opened: November 2022
- Renovation cost: NT$40 million

Website
- Official website (in Chinese)

The Thome Courtyard (traditional Chinese: 東美院; simplified Chinese: 东美院; pinyin: Dōng Měiyuàn) is an art center in Zhongzheng District, Taipei, Taiwan.

== History ==
The art center used to be one of the student dormitory of National Taiwan University and residence of philosopher Thome H. Fang (traditional Chinese: 方東美; simplified Chinese: 方东美; pinyin: Fāng Dōngměi). The building was then renovated at a cost of NT$40 million. It was then opened to the public in November 2022.

== Architecture ==
The art center is a Japanese architecture-style of building. It features a Japanese dry garden on the outside of the building.

== Transportation ==
The art center is accessible within walking distance west of Guring Station of Taipei Metro.

== See also ==
- List of tourist attractions in Taiwan
