= Land Reform Museum =

Museum in Songshan, Taipei, Taiwan

- 土地改革紀念館
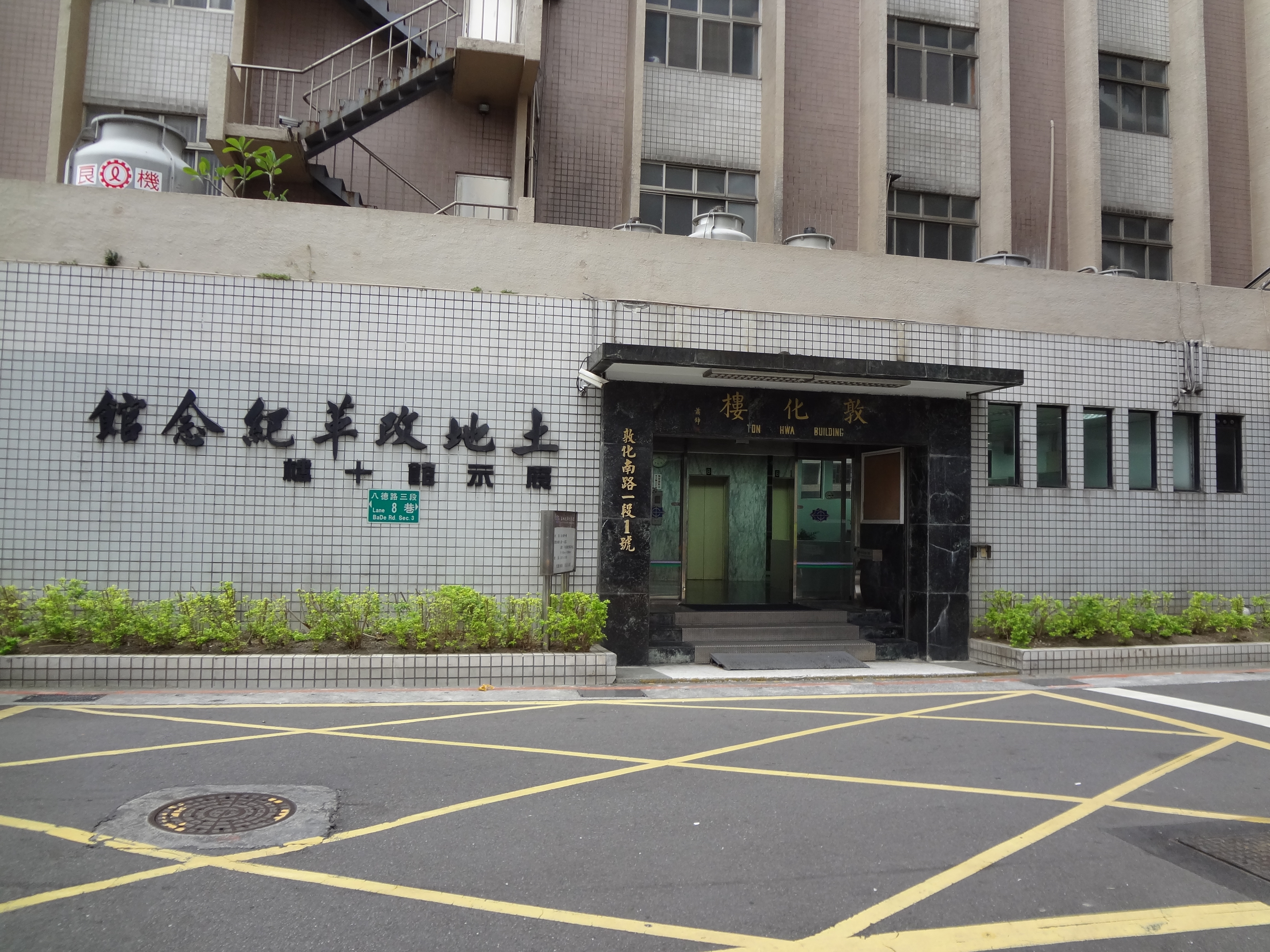
- Established: 11 March 1967
- Location: Songshan, Taipei, Taiwan
- Coordinates: 25°2′51.63″N 121°32′57.53″E
- Type: Museum
- Public transit access: Taipei Arena Station
- Website: Official website

The Land Reform Museum (LRM; Chinese: 土地改革紀念館; pinyin: Tǔdì Gǎigé Jìniànguǎn) is a museum located in Songshan District, Taipei, Taiwan. The purpose of the museum is to commemorate the land reform in Taiwan in the 1950s.

== History ==
The museum was established on 11 March 1967.

== Collection ==
Exhibitions include historical land reform documents including land reform campaign literature, charts, and photographs.

== Transportation ==
The museum is accessible within walking distance South from Taipei Arena Station of Taipei Metro.

== See also ==
- List of museums in Taiwan
