= Zhongxiao Fuxing metro station =

Metro station in Taipei, Taiwan

Zhongxiao Fuxing / 忠孝復興
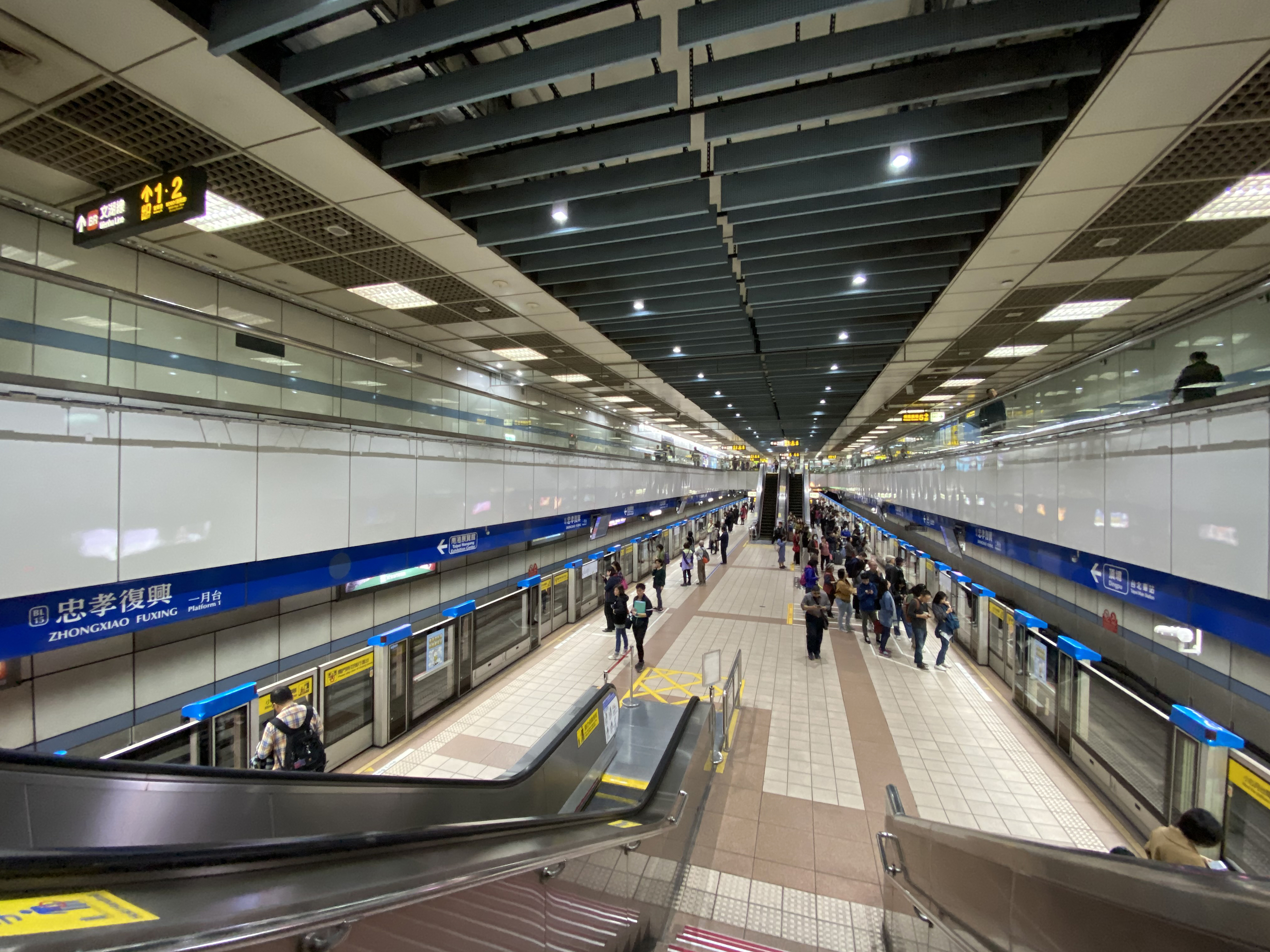
- Zhongxiao Fuxing metro station

Chinese name
- Traditional Chinese: 忠孝復興
- Simplified Chinese: 忠孝复兴
Transcriptions
Standard Mandarin
- Hanyu Pinyin: Zhōngxiào Fùxīng
- Bopomofo: ㄓㄨㄥ ㄒㄧㄠˋ ㄈㄨˋ ㄒㄧㄥ
- Wade–Giles: Chung¹-hsiao⁴ Fu⁴-hsing¹
Hakka
- Pha̍k-fa-sṳ: Chûng-hau Fu̍k-hîn
Southern Min
- Tâi-lô: Tiong-hàu Ho̍k-hing

General information
- Location: 302 Sec 3 Zhongxiao E Rd; Da'an, Taipei (BR); Taiwan
- Coordinates: 25.0416°N 121.5438°E
- System: Taipei metro station

Construction
- Structure type: Elevated (BR); Underground (BL)
- Cycle facilities: No access

Other information
- Station code: ,
- Website: web.metro.taipei/e/stationdetail2010.asp?ID=BL15+BR10-010

History
- Opened: 1996-03-28

Key dates
- 1999-12-24: Bannan line added

Passengers
- 2017: 35.768 million per year ▼3.17%
- Rank: (Ranked 6 of 119)

Services
Preceding station	Taipei Metro	Following station
Daan towards Taipei Zoo	Wenhu line	Nanjing Fuxing towards Nangang Exhib Center
Zhongxiao Xinsheng towards Dingpu	Bannan line	Zhongxiao Dunhua towards Nangang Exhib Center
Location

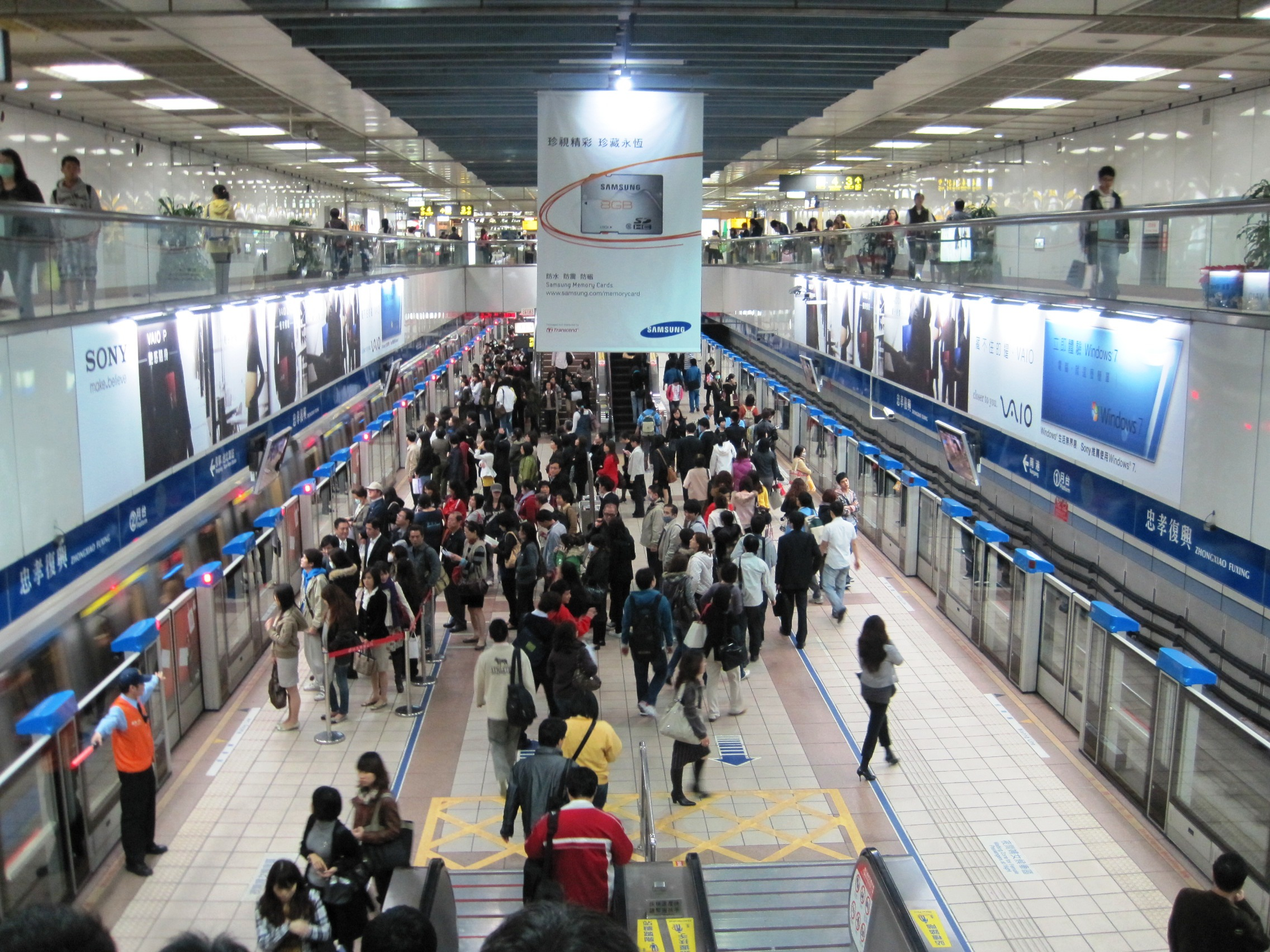
Bannan line platform

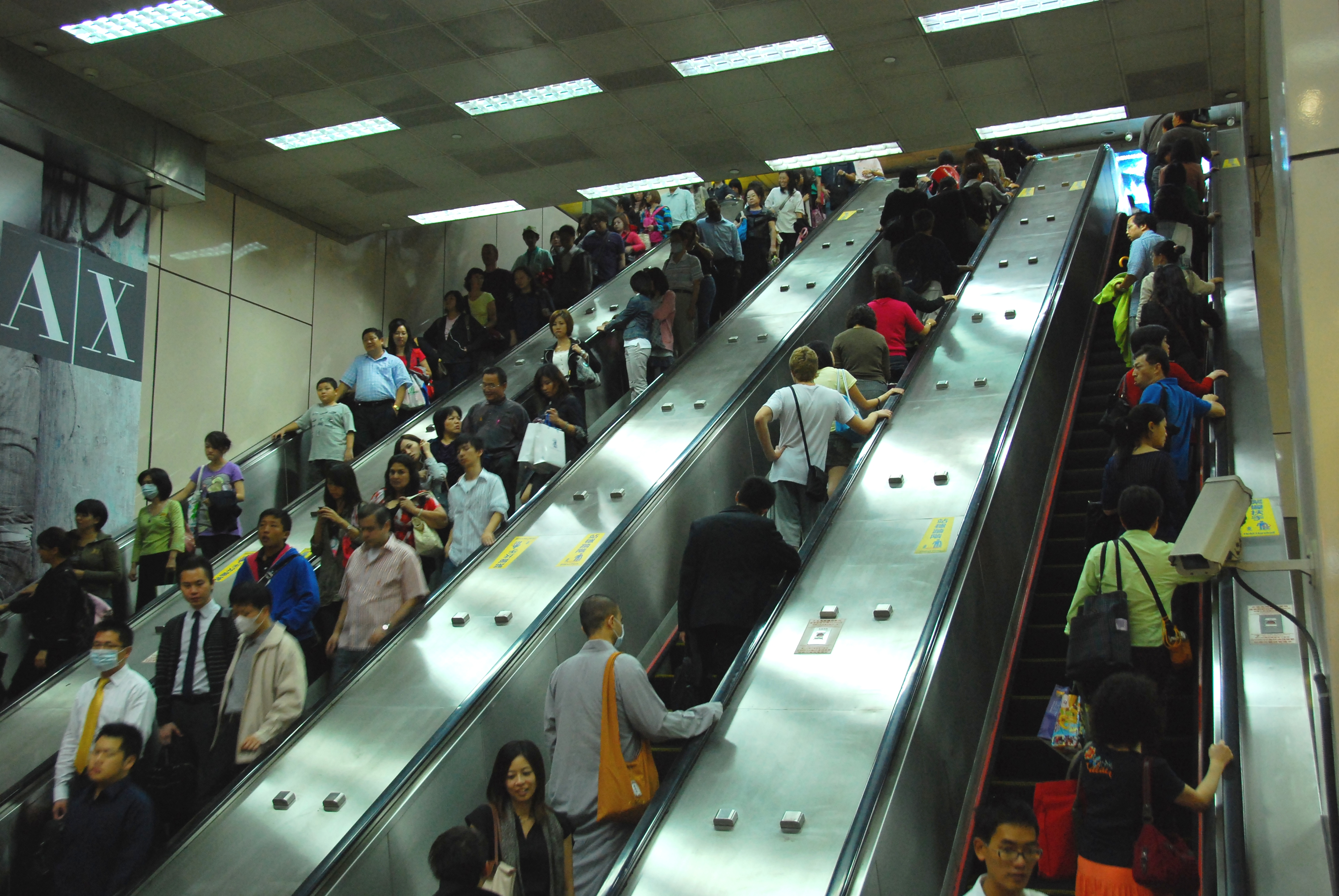
Escalators connecting Brown line and Blue line

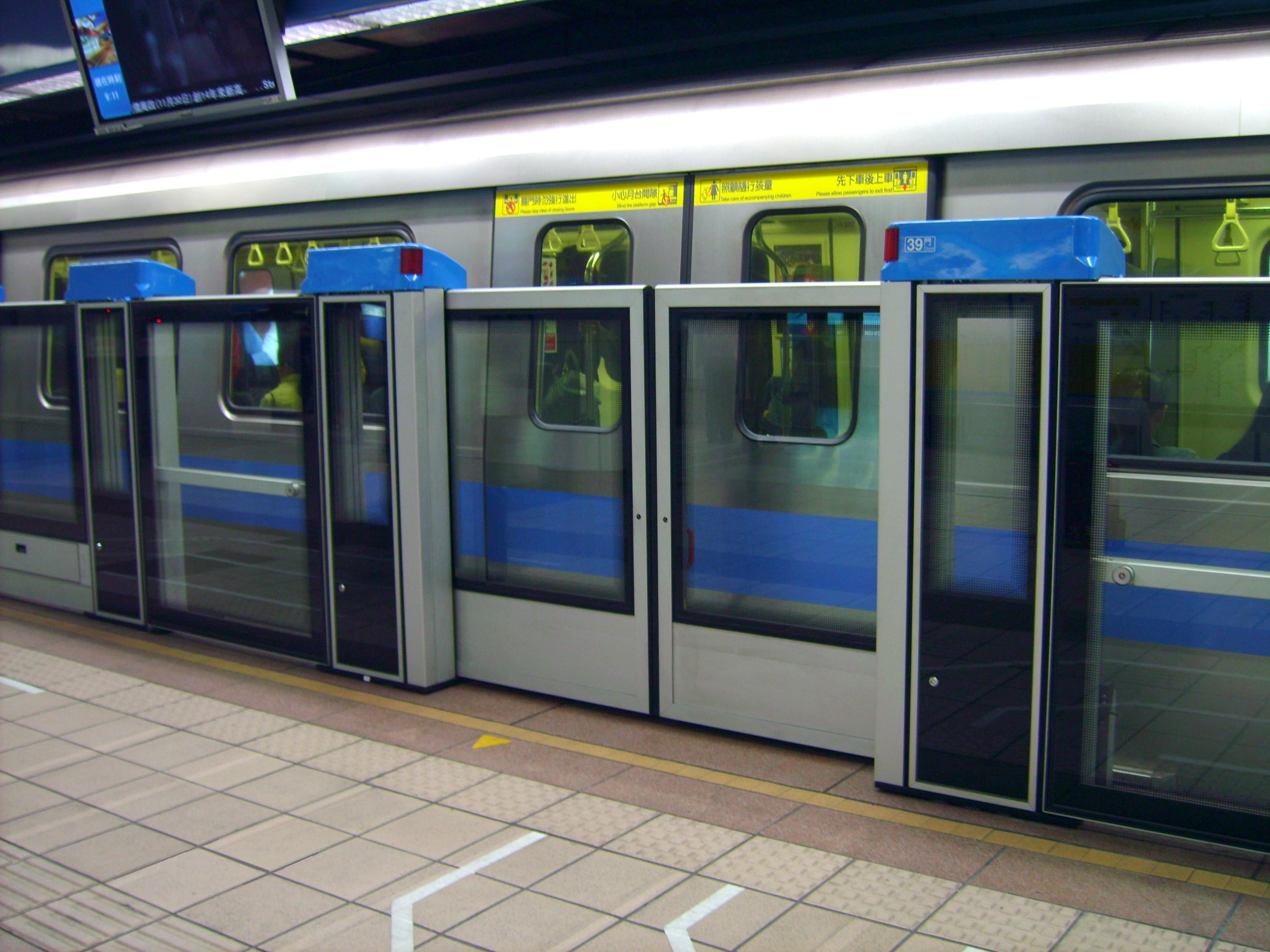
Automatic platform gates were installed on the Blue line platform in 2006 due to increased passenger congestion.

Zhongxiao Fuxing (Chinese: 忠孝復興, formerly transliterated as Chunghsiao Fuhshing Station until 2003) is a metro station in Taipei, Taiwan served by Taipei Metro. It is a transfer station between the Wenhu line and Bannan line. It had a ridership of 20.688 million entries and exits in 2017.

== Station overview ==
The station has both underground and elevated sections: two levels are underground (servicing the Blue line) and four levels above ground (servicing the Brown line). The station has two side platforms, one island platform, and five exits. Brown line platforms are equipped with platform screen doors and Blue line platforms are equipped with automatic platform gates. Washrooms are located inside and outside the paid area of the station.

The station is situated at the intersection of Zhongxiao East Road and Fuxing South Road. The station features four long escalators directly connecting the B3 concourse level with the third-floor platforms. These escalators handle 96,000 transferring passengers daily. On 31 March 2017, Taipei Metro Corporation announced that escalator speeds would be increased from 0.5 m/s (1.6 ft/s) to 0.65 m/s (2.1 ft/s), increasing carrying capacity by 30%. The station can be very crowded during rush hour due to its status as a major transfer station between two lines.

Exit 2 is integrated with the Pacific Sogo Department Store (Fuxing Branch) as part of a joint development project. It is the first business-oriented building based on a Taipei Metro joint development project. In 2010, the station was awarded a "Superior" award at the 8th Golden Thumb Awards (sponsored by the Executive Yuan) for the joint development project.

== History ==
- 28 March 1996: Opened for service along with the opening of the Brown line.
- 24 December 1999: Became a major transfer station with the opening of the segment from Taipei City Hall to Longshan Temple station of the Blue line.
- 10 November 2004: The connection between exit 4 and Pacific SOGO Department Store Zhongxiao Branch opened.
- 19 June 2006: The main connecting escalators gave off thick smoke, resulting in many trains bypassing the station.
- 1 December 2006: Automatic platform gates were installed on Blue line, as first batch of installation among Taipei Main Station.

== Station layout ==
4F	Connecting level	Overpass
3F	Side platform, doors will open on the right
3F	Platform 1	← Wenhu line toward Taipei Nangang Exhibition Center (BR11 Nanjing Fuxing)
3F	Platform 2	→ Wenhu line toward Taipei Zoo (BR09 Daan) →
3F	Side platform, doors will open on the right
3F	Concourse	Lobby, information desk, automatic ticket dispensing machines, one-way faregates, restrooms Entrance to SOGO Department Store Fuxing Branch
2F	Mezzanine	Transit link floor for stairs and escalators
1F	Street level	Entrance/exit
B3	Concourse	Lobby, information desk, automatic ticket dispensing machines, one-way faregates Entrance to SOGO Department Store Zhongxiao and Fuxing Branches and East Metro Mall; Restrooms (inside fare zone, west of the station)
B4	Platform 1	← Bannan line toward Nangang Exhib Center / Kunyang (BL16 Zhongxiao Dunhua)
B4	Island platform, doors will open on the left
B4	Platform 2	→ Bannan line toward Dingpu / Far Eastern Hospital (BL14 Zhongxiao Xinsheng) →

=== Exits ===
- Exit 1: Intersection of Zhongxiao E. Rd. Sec. 3 and Andong St.
- Exit 2: Intersection of Zhongxiao E. Sec. 3, Sec. 4 and Fuxing S. Rd. Sec. 1
- Exit 3: Intersection of Zhongxiao E. Rd. Sec. 4 and Daan Rd. Sec. 1
- Exit 4: Zhongxiao E. Rd. Sec. 4
- Exit 5: Fuxing S. Rd. Sec. 1

== Around the station ==
- Breeze Center - exit 5
- Shiatzy Chen (Daan Store)
- Central Clinic and Hospital
- Republic of China Air Force Headquarters
- Taiwan Contemporary Culture Lab
- SOGO Mall (Zhongxiao Branch - exit 4, Fuxing Branch - exit 2)
- Howard Plaza Hotel - exit 2
- Taipei City Hospital (Renai Branch)
- Huaisheng Elementary School
- Huaisheng Junior High School

=== Underground market ===
- East Metro Mall (connects directly to the station, toward Zhongxiao Dunhua)
