= Puppetry Art Center of Taipei =

Art center in Songshan, Taipei, Taiwan

- 台北偶戲館
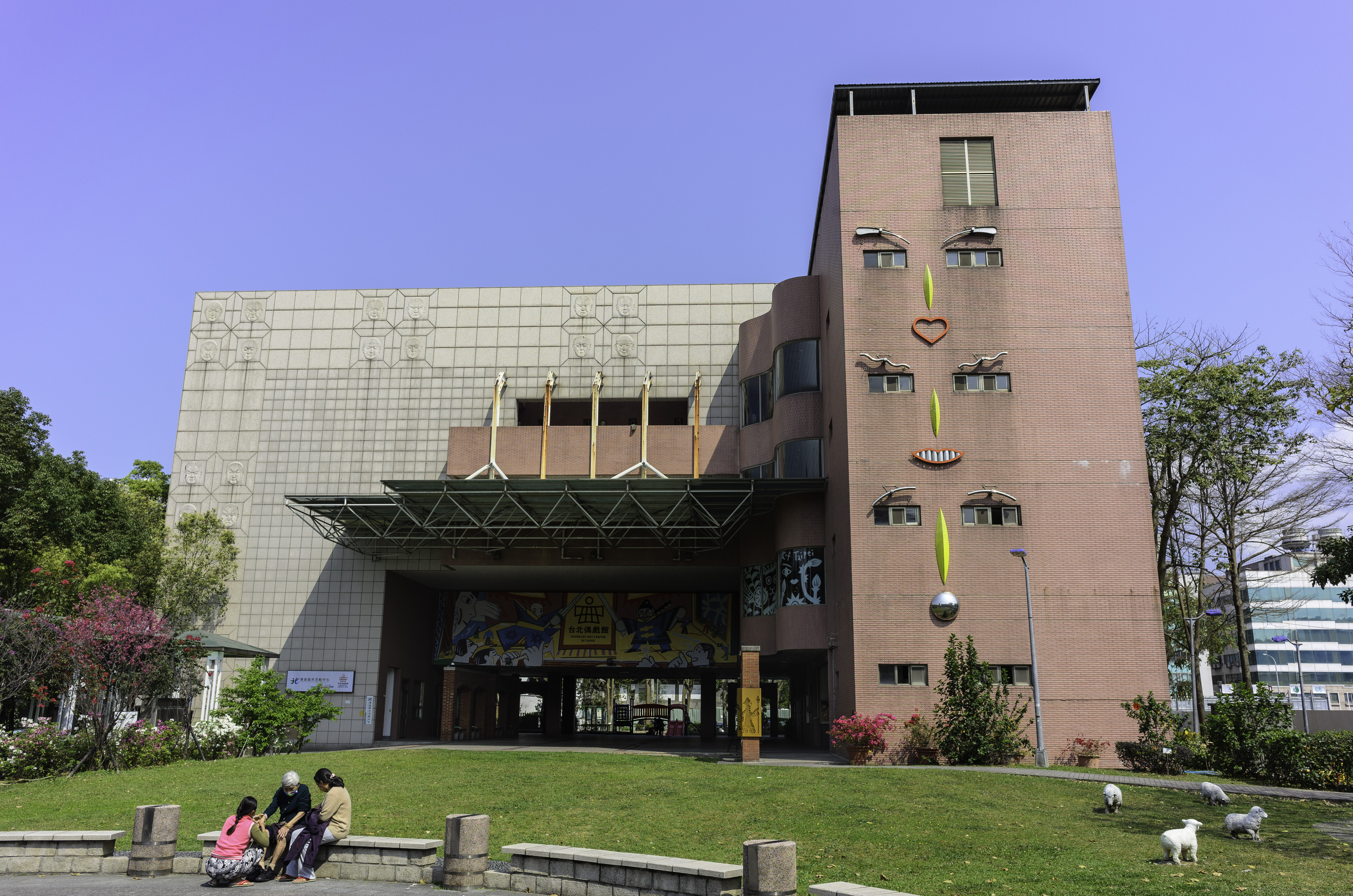
- Interactive map of Puppetry Art Center of Taipei
- Location: Songshan, Taipei, Taiwan
- Coordinates: 25°02′52.2″N 121°33′40.9″E
- Type: arts center

Construction
- Opened: 7 August 2004

Website
- Official website

The Puppetry Art Center of Taipei (PACT; traditional Chinese: 台北偶戲館; simplified Chinese: 台北偶戏馆; pinyin: Táiběi Ǒuxì Guǎn) is an arts center in Songshan District, Taipei, Taiwan.

== History ==
In 1998, Lin Ching-fu, chairperson of the Taiyuan Arts and Culture Foundation, donated his personal collection of puppets which he had been collecting over years to Taipei City Government. The center was then planned by the Department of Cultural Affairs of the city government. The center was eventually opened on 7 August 2004.

== Architecture ==
The center is divided into four areas, which are glove puppets, string puppets, shadow puppets and interactive games.

== Activities ==
The center regularly holds puppet shows and educational puppetry classes, including puppet making workshop.

== Transportation ==
The center is accessible within walking distance southwest of Nanjing Sanmin Station of Taipei Metro.

== See also ==
- List of tourist attractions in Taiwan
