= Taiwan Academy of Banking and Finance =

Organization based in Zhongzheng, Taipei, Taiwan

- 台灣金融研訓院
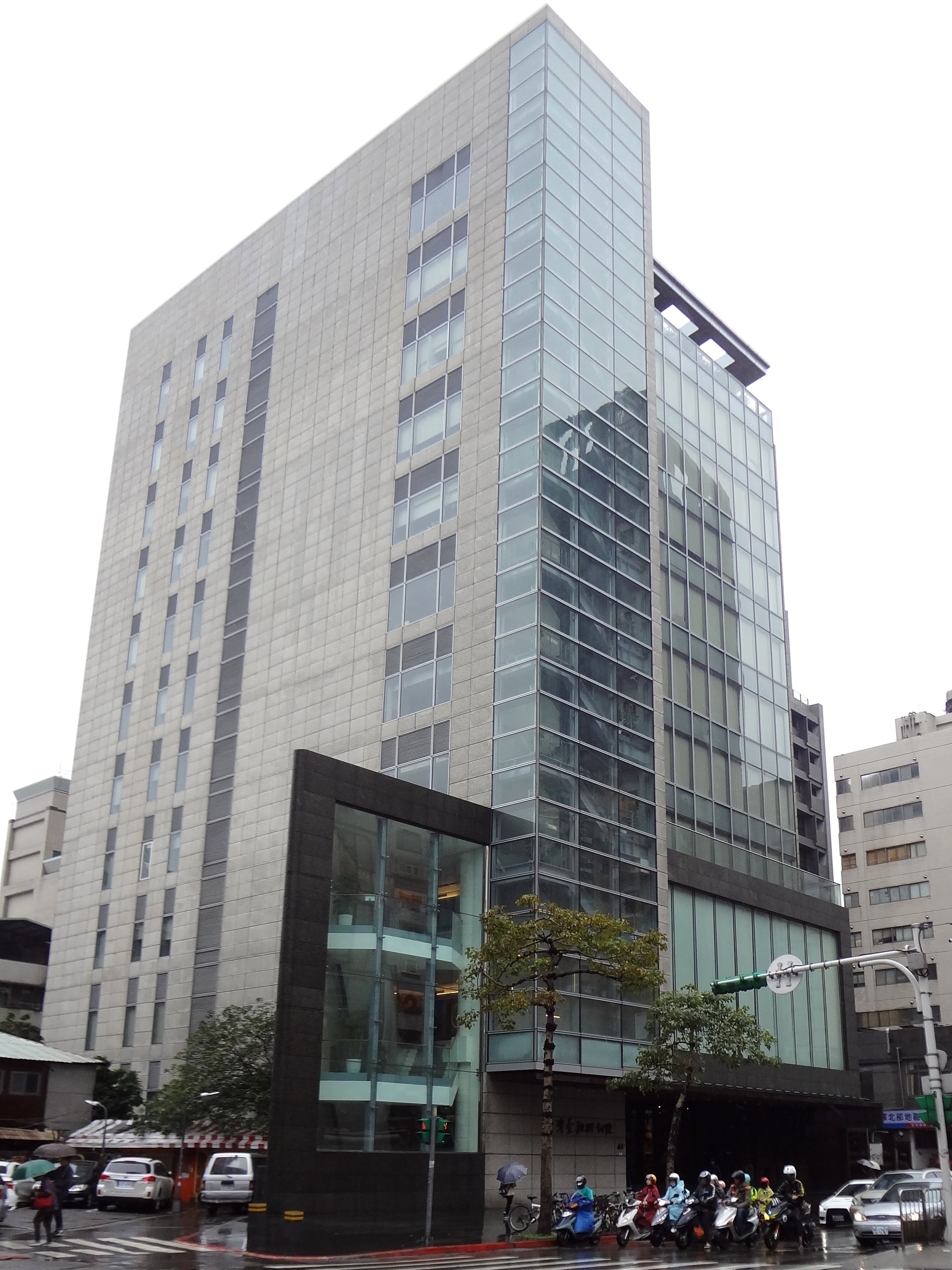
- Abbreviation: TABF
- Formation: May 2000
- Headquarters: Zhongzheng, Taipei, Taiwan
- Coordinates: 25°01′20.3″N 121°31′32.8″E
- Website: Official website

The Taiwan Academy of Banking and Finance (TABF; traditional Chinese: 台灣金融研訓院; simplified Chinese: 台湾金融研训院; pinyin: Táiwān Jīnróng Yánxùn Yuàn) is a non-profit organization, advised by Financial Supervisory Commission (FSC) of Taiwan. It is a pioneer in Taiwan for research, training, proficiency testing, and publication services for banking professionals.

Currently, Paul C. D. Lei is the chairman and LIN, CHUNG-WEI is the acting president in TABF.

== History ==
In May 2000 TABF was officially established through the merger of the Banking Institute of the Republic of China (BIROC) and the Banking and Finance Institute (BFI).

== Organizational structures ==
- Financial Research Institute
- Training and Development Institute
- Overseas Business Institute
- Proficiency Testing Institute
- Publication and Communication Institute
- Customer Service Center
- Administration Department
- Information Technology Department

== Services ==
- Financial Research: To provide policy suggestions to financial regulatory authorities, and illustrate a vision for both the government as well as financial services industries.
- Financial Training & Development: To provide banking practitioners with systematic learning paths to navigate challenges and opportunities in their professional life.
- Proficiency Testing: To issue banking accreditation certificates to enhance the quality of the financial workforce.
- Publication and Communication: To publish a variety of specialized financial books and issue the Taiwan Banker magazine.
- Fin & Tech Innovation Village: To enrich FinTech talent and provide technological consulting services.

== Overseas business development ==
TABF founded the Overseas Business Institute (OBI) in 2010 in order to help promote the internationalization of Taiwan’s financial services. First, the OBI offers a wide array of international training programmes and courses for financial professionals. Meanwhile, TABF acts as a regional hub for financial knowledge transfers between Taiwan and the rest of world, keen to extend its international financial networks to build meaningful connections and strengthen mutually beneficial partnerships. For instance, TABF has been honoured to take over as the secretariat office of the Asian Pacific Association of Banking Institutes (APABI), engaging with the total of 21 member countries in the Asia-Pacific to foster exchange and collaboration on financial training and education. Furthermore, TABF has formally joined the Talent Circulation Alliance (TCA) in Taiwan to develop international talent by promoting talent connection, cultivation, and circulation between Taiwan and other like-minded countries.

== Board members ==
=== Directors ===
- Paul C. D. Lei (the Chairman of Taiwan Academy of Banking and Finance)
- Yi-Cheng Kao (the Associate Professor of Fu Jen Catholic University, Department of Economics)
- Sherri H.Y. Chuang (the Director General of Banking Bureau of the Financial Supervisory Commission)
- Kao, Ching-Ping (the Deputy Director General of Securities and Futures Bureau of the Financial Supervisory Commission)
- Tsung-Yung Lee (the Director General of Agricultural Finance Agency, Ministry of Agriculture)
- Tao, Hue-Heng (the Deputy Director General of Department of Banking Central Bank of the Republic of China (Taiwan))
- Ray B. Dawn (the Chairman of Mega International Commercial Bank)
- Ling, Jong-Yuan (the Chairman of Bank Of Taiwan)
- Chen, Shi-Kuan (the Chairman of SinoPac Holdings)
- Lin, Yen-Mao (the Chairman of Taiwan Cooperative Bank)
- Huang, Nan-Chou (the Chairman of E.SUN Bank)
- Chun-Chih Huang (the Managing Director & President of Hua Nan Bank)
- Monica Chiou (the Chairman of Trust Association of R.O.C.)
- Wea, Chi-Lin (the Chairman of R.O.C. Bills Finance Association)
- Shen-Gang Mai (the Chairman of The National Federation of Credit Co-operatives R. O. C.)

=== Supervisors ===
- Tong, Chen-Chang (the Director General of Financial Examination Bureau of the Financial Supervisory Commission)
- Tseng Wang-Ruu (the Executive Vice President of National Taiwan University)
- Yih-Jiuan Wu (the Director General of Department of Economic Research Central Bank of the Republic of China (Taiwan))
- Chen, Jie (the Chairman of Supervision Committee of The National Federation of Credit Co-operatives R. O. C.)
- Lee, Chun Shen (the Executive Director of Xizhi District Farmers' Association)
