= Taiwan Contemporary Culture Lab =

Cultural center in Da'an, Taipei, Taiwan

- 臺灣當代文化實驗場
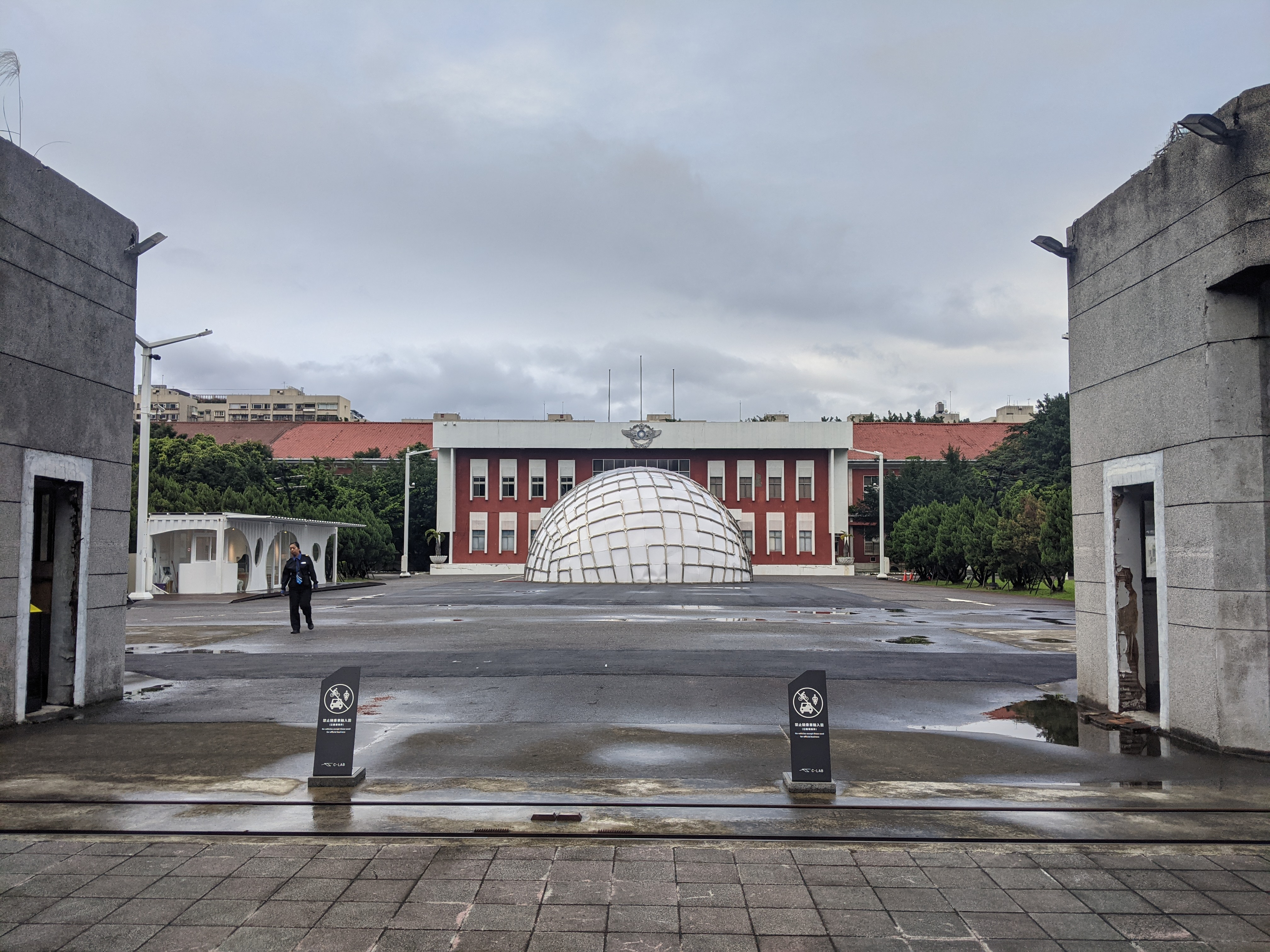
- Interactive map of Taiwan Contemporary Culture Lab
- Location: Da'an, Taipei, Taiwan
- Coordinates: 25°02′25.0″N 121°32′18.7″E
- Operator: Taiwan Living Arts Foundation
- Type: cultural center
- Public transit: Zhongxiao Fuxing Station

Construction
- Opened: 18 August 2018

Website
- Official website

The Taiwan Contemporary Culture Lab (C-LAB; traditional Chinese: 臺灣當代文化實驗場; simplified Chinese: 台湾当代文化实验场; pinyin: Táiwān Dāngdài Wénhuà Shíyàn Chǎng) is a cultural center in Da'an District, Taipei, Taiwan. It is run by Taiwan Living Arts Foundation of the Ministry of Culture.

== History ==
The building of the center used to be the former headquarters of the Republic of China Air Force. In April 2018, Culture Minister Cheng Li-chun announced the plan to transform the headquarters into an art and innovation space. It was then later transformed into the Taiwan Contemporary Culture Lab by Living Arts International and was opened to the public on 15 August 2018.

== Transportation ==
The venue is accessible within walking distance west of Zhongxiao Fuxing Station of Taipei Metro.

== See also ==
- List of tourist attractions in Taiwan
