= Taipower Building metro station =

Metro station in Taipei, Taiwan

Taipower Building 台電大樓
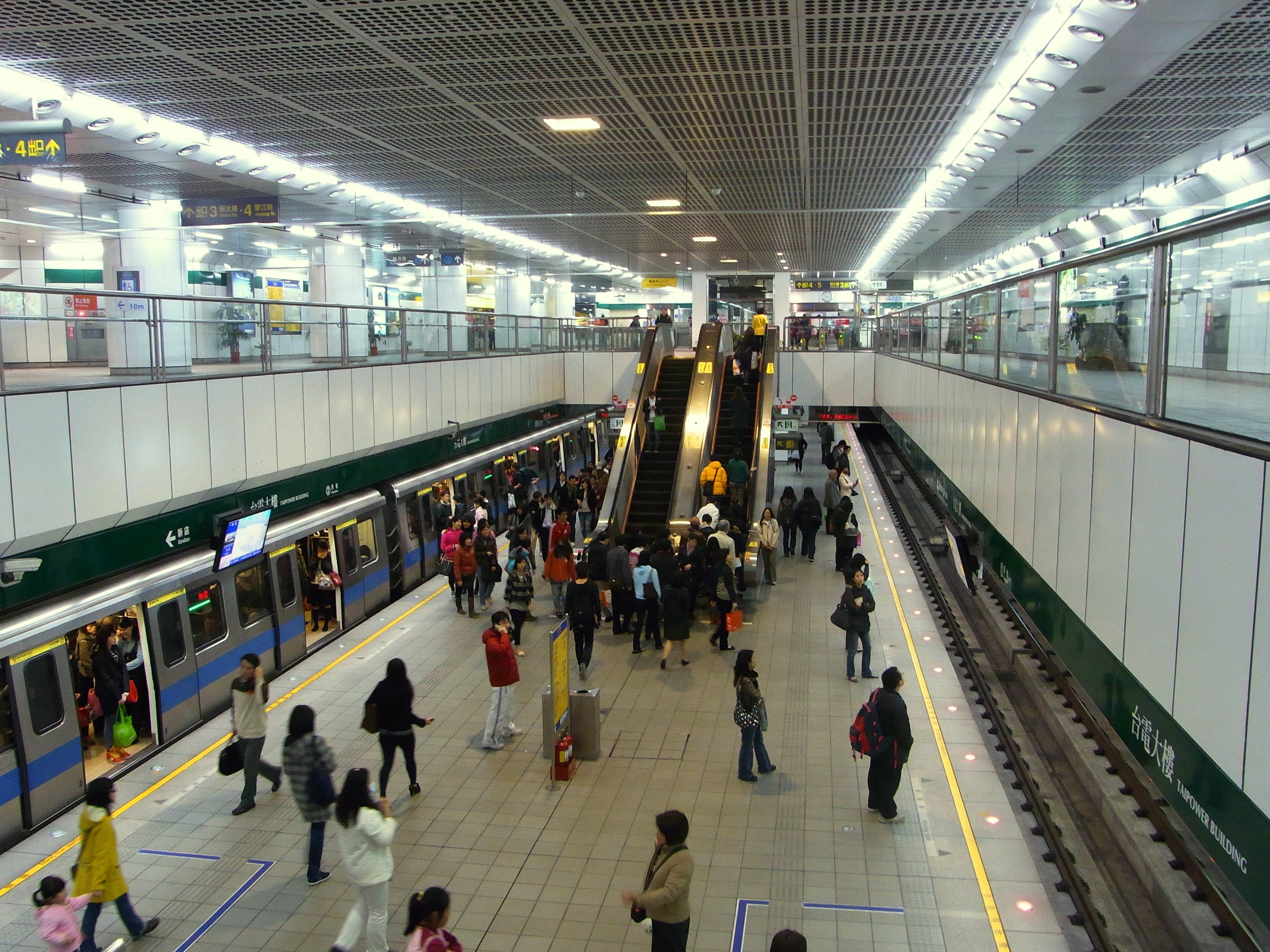
- Platform

Chinese name
- Traditional Chinese: 台電大樓
- Simplified Chinese: 台电大楼
Transcriptions
Standard Mandarin
- Hanyu Pinyin: Taídiàn Dàlóu
- Bopomofo: ㄊㄞˊ ㄉㄧㄢˋ ㄉㄚˋ ㄌㄡˊ
- Wade–Giles: Taitien Talou
Hakka
- Pha̍k-fa-sṳ: Thòi-thien Thai-lèu
Southern Min
- Tâi-lô: Tâi-tiān Tuā-lâu

General information
- Location: B1F 63-3 Sec. 3 Roosevelt Rd. Zhongzheng and Da'an, Taipei; Taiwan
- Coordinates: 25.020522°N 121.528325°E
- Operator: Taipei Metro
- Line: Songshan–Xindian line
- Connections: Bus stop

Construction
- Structure type: Underground

Other information
- Station code: G08

History
- Opened: 11 November 1999; 26 years ago

Passengers
- 32,676 daily (December 2024)
- Rank: (Ranked 52 of 119)

Services
| Preceding station | Taipei Metro | Following station |
|---|---|---|
| Guting towards Songshan | Songshan–Xindian line | Terminus |
| Guting towards Songshan | Songshan–Xindian line | Gongguan towards Xindian |
Location

The Taipei Metro Taipower Building station is a station on the Songshan–Xindian line located on the border in Taipei, Taiwan.

== Station overview ==
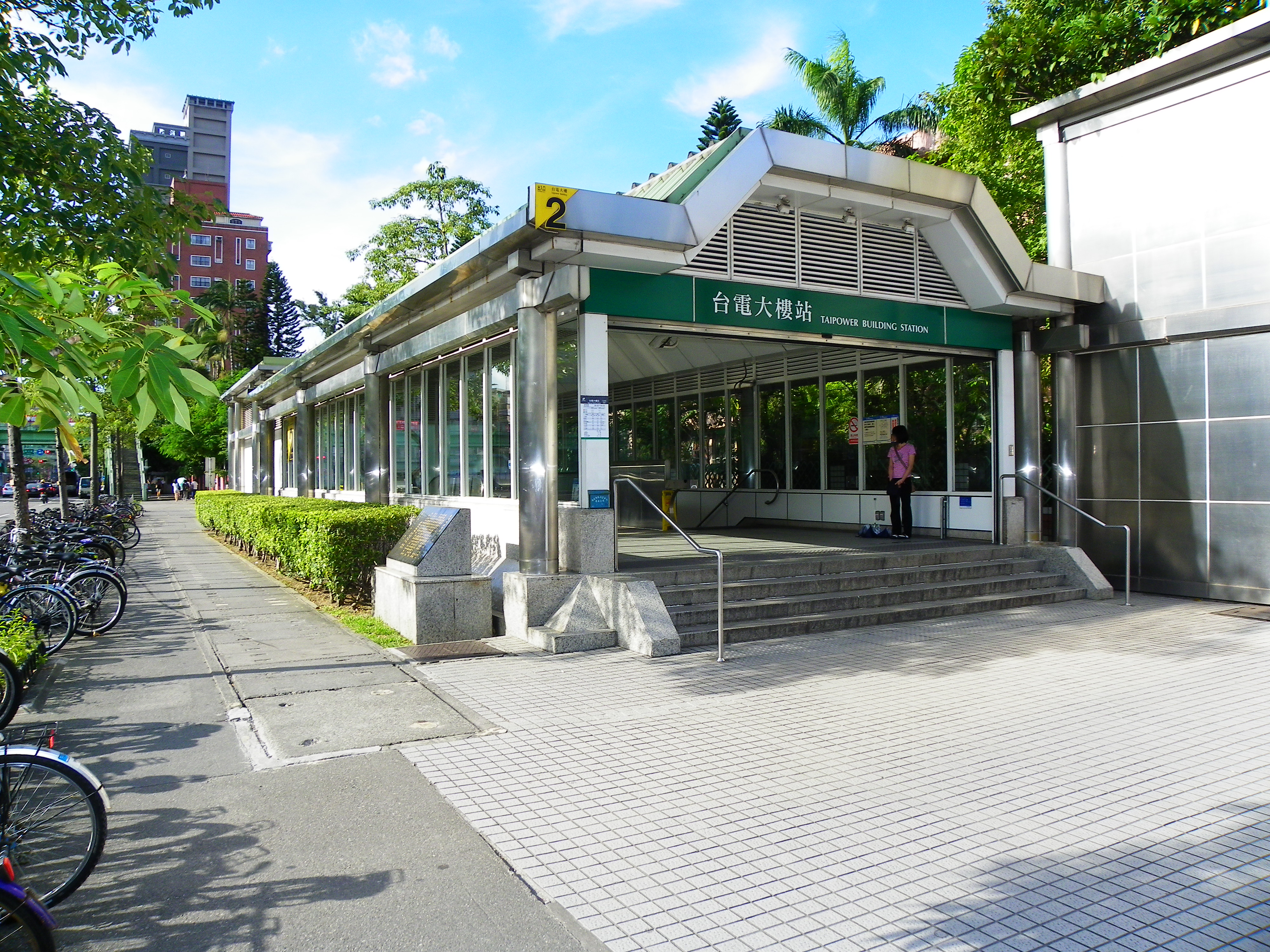
Taipower Building station exit 2

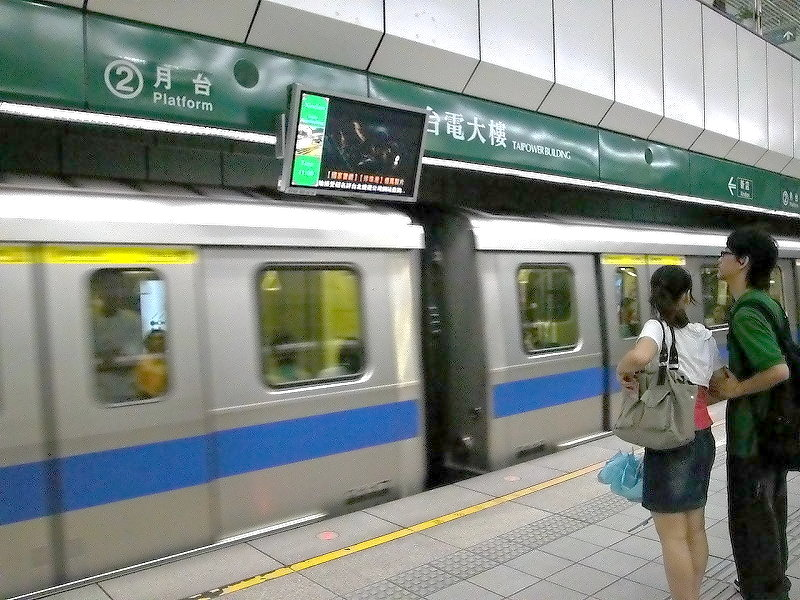
Taipower Building station platform

This two-level, underground station has an island platform and five exits.

Some trains from Songshan terminate here and reenter service by utilizing the pocket track south of the station.

== History ==
During initial planning in 1980, the station was to be named Sanzong (三總), after the Tri-Service General Hospital, which has since relocated to Neihu.

== Station layout ==
| Street level | Entrance/exit | Entrance/exit |
| B1 | Concourse | Lobby, information counter, automatic ticket-dispensing machines, one-way faregates |
| B1 | Concourse | Restrooms (north side outside fare zone, near exit 2), Taipower Building ATM |
| B2 | Platform 1 | ← Songshan–Xindian line toward Songshan (G09 Guting) |
| B2 | Island platform, doors will open on the left |
| B2 | Platform 2 | → Songshan–Xindian line toward Xindian (G07 Gongguan) → → Songshan–Xindian line termination platform → |

Select Songshan–Xindian line trains terminate here during non-rush hours.

== Around the station ==
- Taipei Cultural Mosque
- Shida Park
- Taipei Hakka Cultural Park

== See also ==
- List of railway stations in Taiwan
