= Songshan station =

Railway station in Xinyi, Taipei, Taiwan

Songshan 松山
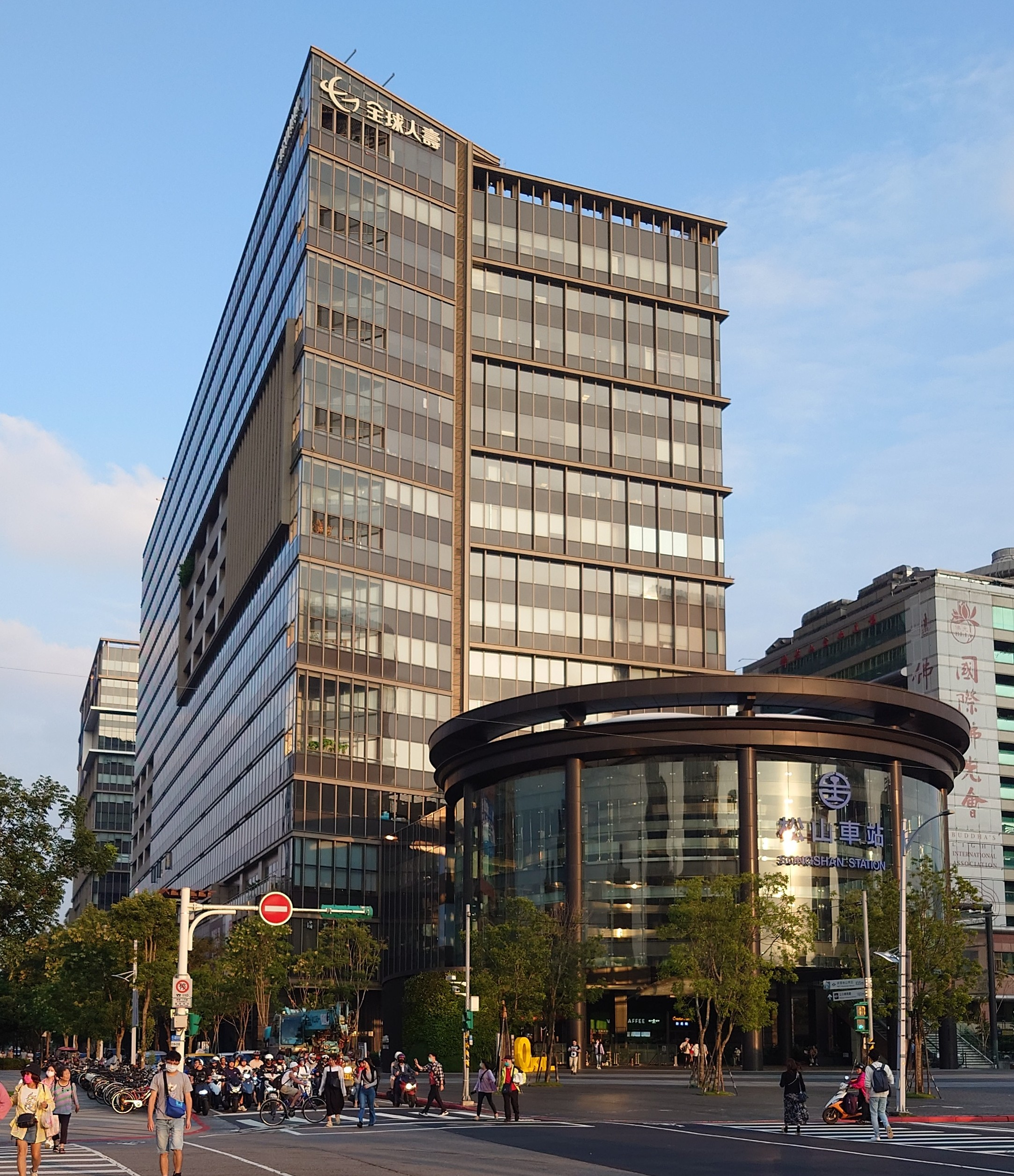

Chinese name
- Chinese: 松山
- Literal meaning: Pine mountain
Transcriptions
Standard Mandarin
- Hanyu Pinyin: Sōngshān
- Bopomofo: ㄙㄨㄥ ㄕㄢ
Hakka
- Pha̍k-fa-sṳ: Chhiùng-sân
Southern Min
- Tâi-lô: Siông-san

General information
- Location: 11 Songshan Rd; Xinyi District, Taipei; Taiwan
- Coordinates: 25.0493°N 121.5780°E
- System: TR railway station
- Line: Western Trunk line
- Distance: 21.9 km to Keelung
- Connections: Rapid transit; Local bus; Coach

Construction
- Structure type: Underground

Other information
- Station code: 98 (three-digit); 1007 (four-digit); A08 (statistical)
- Classification: First class (Chinese: 一等)

History
- Opened: 1 November 1891
- Rebuilt: 21 September 2008
- Electrified: 9 January 1978
- Former names: Xikou (Chinese: 錫口); Matsuyama (Japanese: 松山)

Key dates
- 1940: Rebuilt
- 1986: Rebuilt
- 2003: Rebuilt
- 29 December 2009: Station building complete

Passengers
- 35,794 daily (2024)

Services
Preceding station	Taiwan Railway	Following station
Nangang towards Keelung	Western Trunk line	Taipei towards Pingtung
Location
- Location within Taiwan

Songshan / Y39 松山
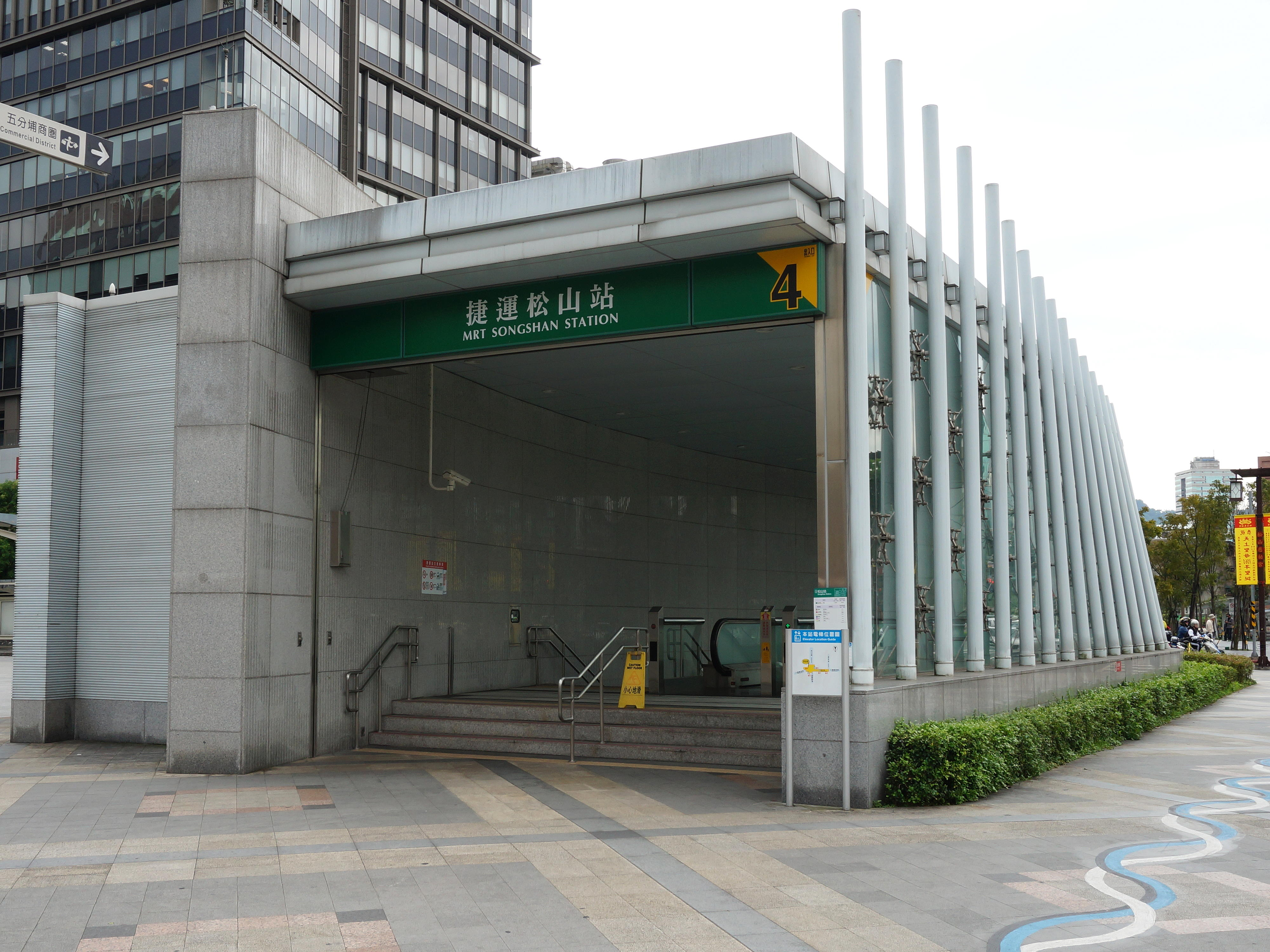
- Taipei metro exit 4

Chinese name
- Chinese: 松山
Transcriptions
Standard Mandarin
- Hanyu Pinyin: Sōngshān
- Bopomofo: ㄙㄨㄥ ㄕㄢ
Hakka
- Pha̍k-fa-sṳ: Chhiùng-sân
Southern Min
- Tâi-lô: Siông-san

General information
- Location: 742 Sec 4 Bade Rd; Songshan District, Taipei; Taiwan
- System: Taipei Metro station
- Lines: Songshan–Xindian line Circular line (under construction)

Construction
- Structure type: Underground
- Cycle facilities: Access available

Other information
- Station code: , Y39
- Website: web.metro.taipei/e/stationdetail2010.asp?ID=G19-111

History
- Opened: 15 November 2014; 11 years ago

Passengers
- 2017: 16.330 million per year ▲7.98%
- Rank: (Ranked 30 of 119)

Services
Preceding station	Taipei Metro	Following station
Terminus	Songshan–Xindian line	Nanjing Sanmin towards Taipower Building or Xindian

Future services
Preceding station	Taipei Metro	Following station
Y38 Foward direction	Circular line Opening 2032	Yongchun Reverse direction
Location

Songshan (Chinese: 松山; pinyin: Sōngshān) is a railway and metro station in Taipei, Taiwan, served by Taiwan Railway and Taipei Metro. This station connects to the shopping centre at basement 1 and level 1. It is a planned transfer for the Circular line.

== Station overview ==
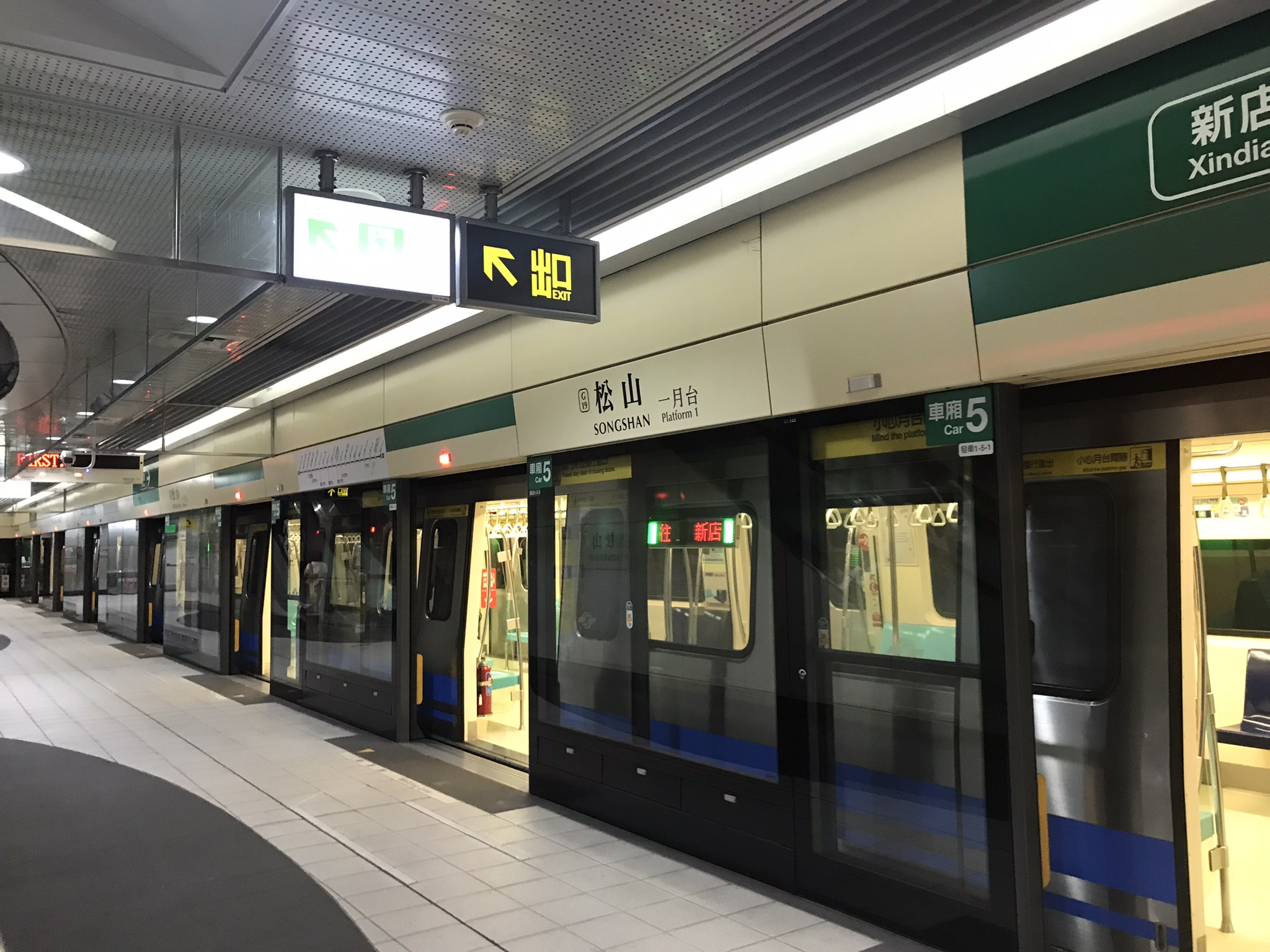
Songshan MRT platform 1

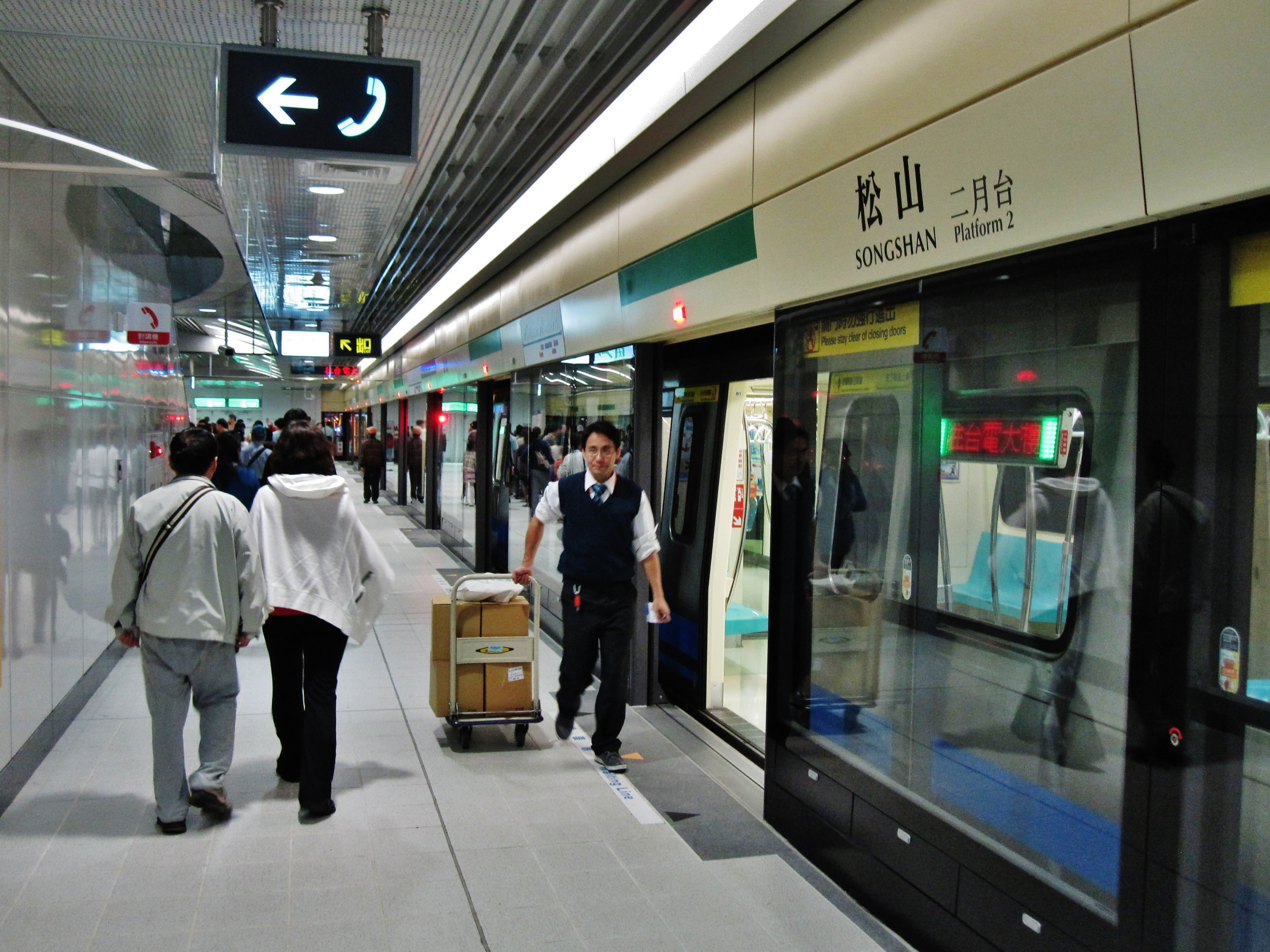
Songshan MRT platform 2

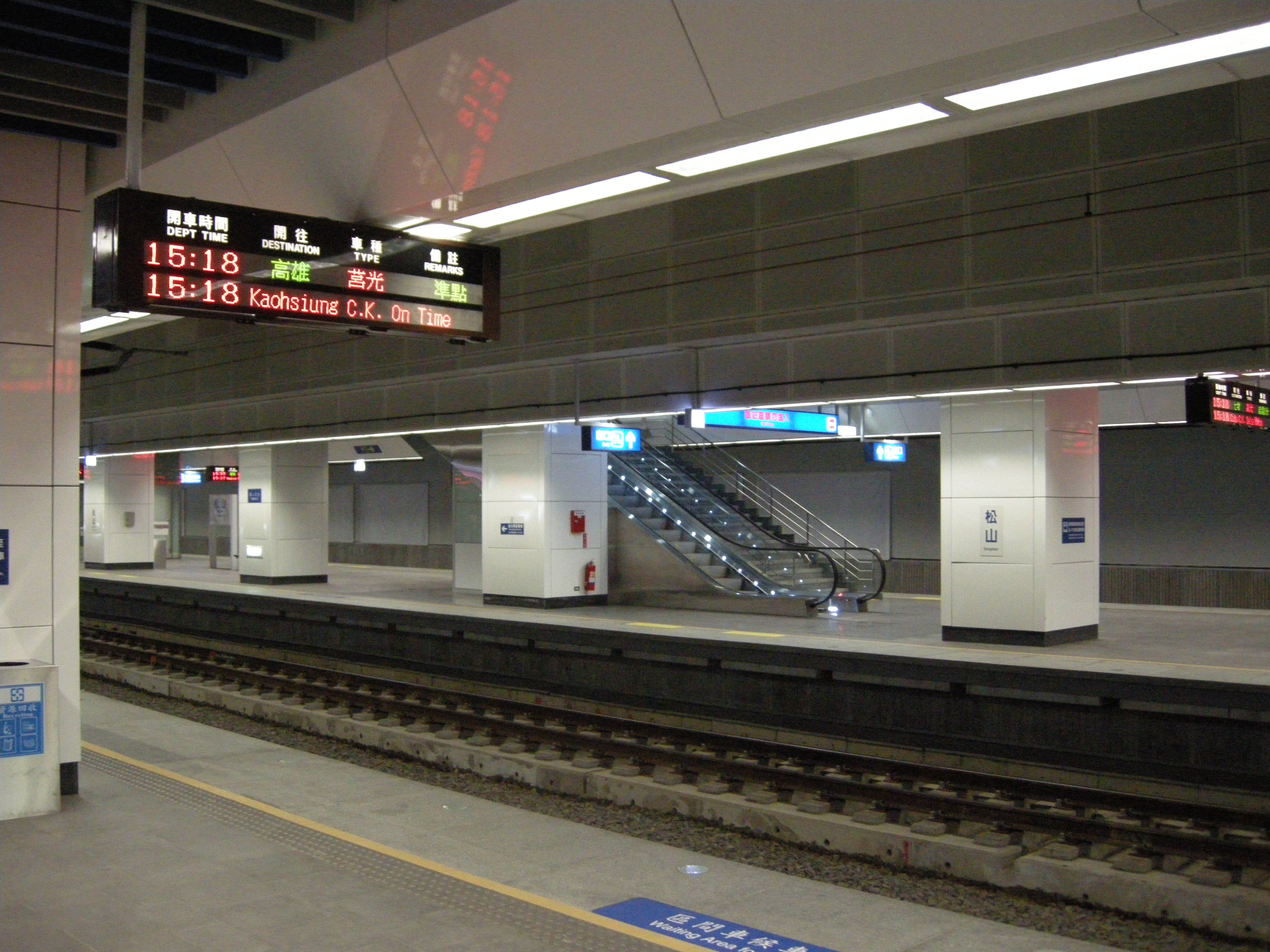
TRA platforms

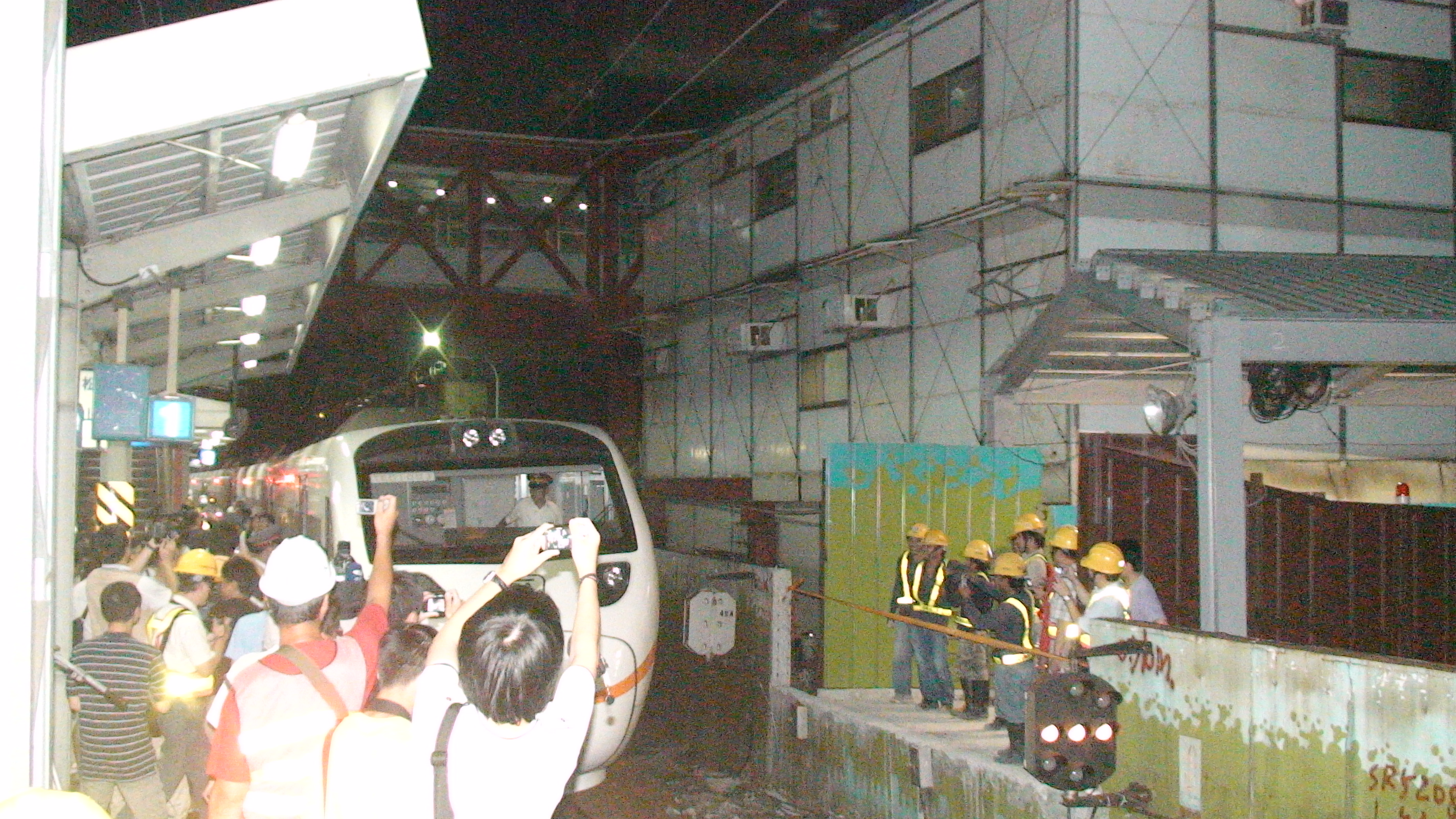
A TEMU1000 stops at the old at-grade station just before it closed, September 2008.

Songshan Station became the principal south-bound origin and north-bound terminus for the Western Trunk line starting in 1986, after the reconstruction of Taipei Main Station began in 1985. These functions were moved to Qidu in Keelung shortly before the reconstruction. The former Songshan Station was at-grade and operated by the Taiwan Railway Administration (TRA). It opened as a temporary station in July 2003 as part of the Taipei Railway Underground Project. All railway lines and platforms have been moved underground (from at-grade) since 21 September 2008, in a move to improve safety and area development. A 7.6 kilometres (4.7 mi) tunnel was constructed between this station and neighboring Nangang Station at a cost of NT$76.5 billion.

The current station building opened for service in 2008. Built by Ruentex Development Company, the new station building was constructed via a NT$3.3 billion build-operate-transfer (BOT) contract. The Taiwan Railways Administration section consists of two island platforms (four tracks), while the Taipei Metro station has an island platform and five exits. They are connected via an underground passage.

The new Taipei Metro station has a "Halo of City" theme with an egg-shaped hall and columns forming a ring structure. The station is 21 m (69 ft) deep, 390 m (1,280 ft) long, and 24 m (79 ft) wide. It has six exits, four vent shafts, and two accessibility elevators. The north side of the station is land for a joint development project.

=== Public art ===
The Taipei Metro station features a theme of "Festivities of Light" to reflect the mix of traditional and modern culture, local religion, and administration. It enhances the night activity in the area.

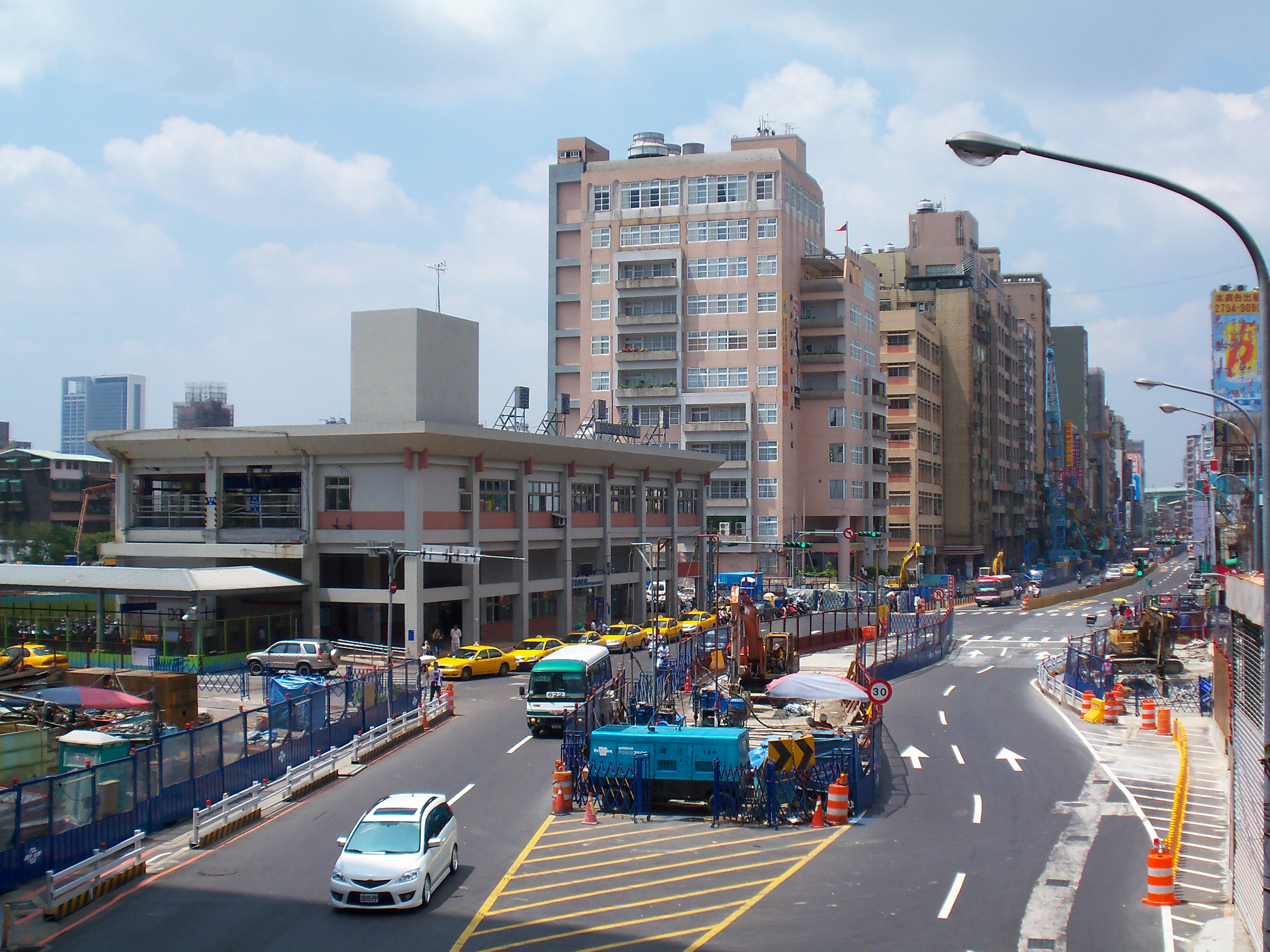
Construction around the station for the Taipei Metro Songshan line

=== Bicycle accessibility ===
Songshan Station is the 0-kilometre (0 mi) starting point for the Taiwan Cycling Route No. 1, and the station features a bicycle accessibility stair ramp.

== History ==
The area around Songshan Station was originally part of a vast field which was maintained for deer hunting.

On 20 October 1891, it was opened as "Sekkhao Train Wharf" (錫口火車碼頭). Then, it was renamed to Seikō Station (錫口停車場) in 1895, and in 1920 the station became known as Matsuyama Station.

On 30 March 1936, the Matsuyama Airport Line (later renamed Songshan Power Station Line, until 1 May 1966) began operation from Matsuyama Station to Matsuyama Airport. On 1 January 1955, it was upgraded to a second-class train station. Songshan Airport Line stopped operating in 1976 and freight services ceased on 15 August 1985. The new station building opened on 15 July 1986, and on 1 July 1987 it became a first-class train station. Freight cargo services were shifted to Nangang on 20 September 1991. The station moved underground on 21 September 2008, and the temporary station was present from 28 July 2003 to 29 December 2009.

On 15 November 2014, the Songshan Line terminus opened for service.

On 7 July 2016, an explosion occurred on a train arriving to Songshan Station; an incident known as the Taiwan Railways bombing. A broken metal tube filled with explosive material was found on the scene, and an investigation named one of the injured passengers, Lin Ying-chang, as the main suspect. Lin was later detained and admitted to carrying out the bombing.

== Station layout ==
Street level	Entrance/exit	Entrance/exit
B1	Concourse	Ticket gates, waiting area, TRA ticketing, automatic ticket dispensing machines, restrooms
B2	Platform 1A	West Coast Line toward Taichung TRA station, Kaohsiung (Taipei)
B2	Island platform
B2	Platform 1B	toward Shulin (Taipei)
B2	Platform 2A	toward Keelung (Nangang)
B2	Island platform
B2	Platform 2B	West Coast Line toward Yilan, Hualien, Taitung (Nangang)
B2	Concourse	Lobby, information desk, automatic ticket dispensing machines, one-way faregates, restrooms
B3	Platform 1	→ Songshan–Xindian line toward Xindian / Taipower Building (G18 Nanjing Sanmin) →
B3	Island platform, doors open on the left, right
B3	Platform 2	→ Songshan–Xindian line toward Xindian / Taipower Building (G18 Nanjing Sanmin) →

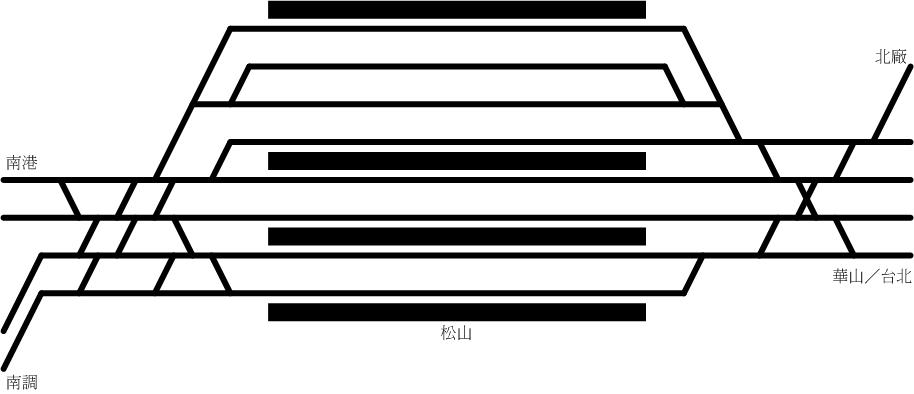
Track layout of original at-grade station

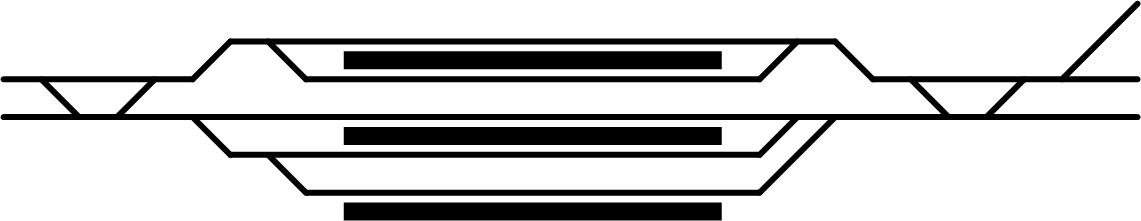
Track layout of temporary station used 2003–2009

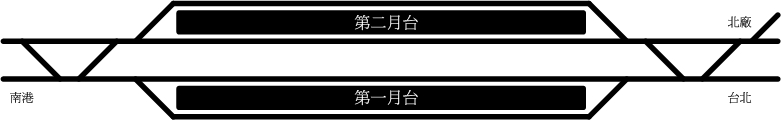
Track layout of new underground station

== Around the station ==
- Songshan Market (next to the station)
- Raohe Street Night Market (50m to the north)
- Nangang Sports Center (200m to the east)
- Rainbow Bridge (300m to the northwest)
- Wufenpu Park (300m to the south)
- Wuchang Park (350m to the southwest)
- Wufenpu Shopping District (400m to the south)
- Houshanpi metro station (550m to the southeast)
- Nansong Market (600m to the west)
- Yongji Market (650m to the south)
- Yongchun Market (700m to the south)
- Yongji Park (800m to the south)
- Yongchun Park (850m to the south)
- Chengmei Left Bank Riverside Park (1km to the northeast)
- Yongchun metro station (1km to the south)

== See also ==
- List of railway stations in Taiwan
