= Xindian =

Xindian may refer to:

== Taiwan ==
- Xindian District (新店區), New Taipei, Taiwan (Republic of China)
- Xindian line, a metro branch line of the Songshan–Xindian line
- Xindian River, a river in northern Taiwan
- Hsintien line, a Taiwanese railroad branch line

== Mainland China ==
- Xindian culture, Bronze Age culture in Gansu and Qinghai

=== Towns ===
==== Written as 辛店镇 ====
- Xindian, Mengcun County, Hebei
- Xindian, Ren County, Hebei
- Xindian, Dezhou, in Yucheng, Shandong

==== Written as 新店镇 ====
- Xindian, Xiamen, in Xiang'an District, Xiamen, Fujian

== See also ==
- Xindi (Star Trek), a collective term for six fictional races in the television series Star Trek: Enterprise
- Xindian station (disambiguation)
- Sindian (disambiguation), alternative transliteration
