= Bitan (disambiguation) =

Bitan can refer to:

- The Pinyin for brushtalk, 笔谈
- Bitan, Xindian District, New Taipei, Taiwan
- Bitan Aharon, a moshav in central Israel
- David Bitan, Israeli lawyer and politician
- Gabriel Bitan (born 1998), Romania athlete
- Haim Bitan, Tunisian rabbi
- Hana Bitan (born 1938), Israeli geographer
- Stephanie Bitan, French Editor
- Sylvain Bitan (born 1941), Tunisian athlete
- Yeinot Bitan, Israeli supermarket chain
- Bana Bitan, a place name in Kolkata, West Bengal, India
- Bitan Roy, character in Bengali web series Abar Proloy
- Kinneret Zmora-Bitan Dvir, Israeli book publishing company
- Dream Pool Essays (夢溪筆談; Mengxi Bitan), Chinese extensive book
- Xindian metro station, of which deputy station name is Bitan metro station, on the Taipei Metro, Taiwan

== See also ==
- Xiaobitan (disambiguation)
