= Qizhang metro station =

Metro station in New Taipei, Taiwan

Qizhang 七張
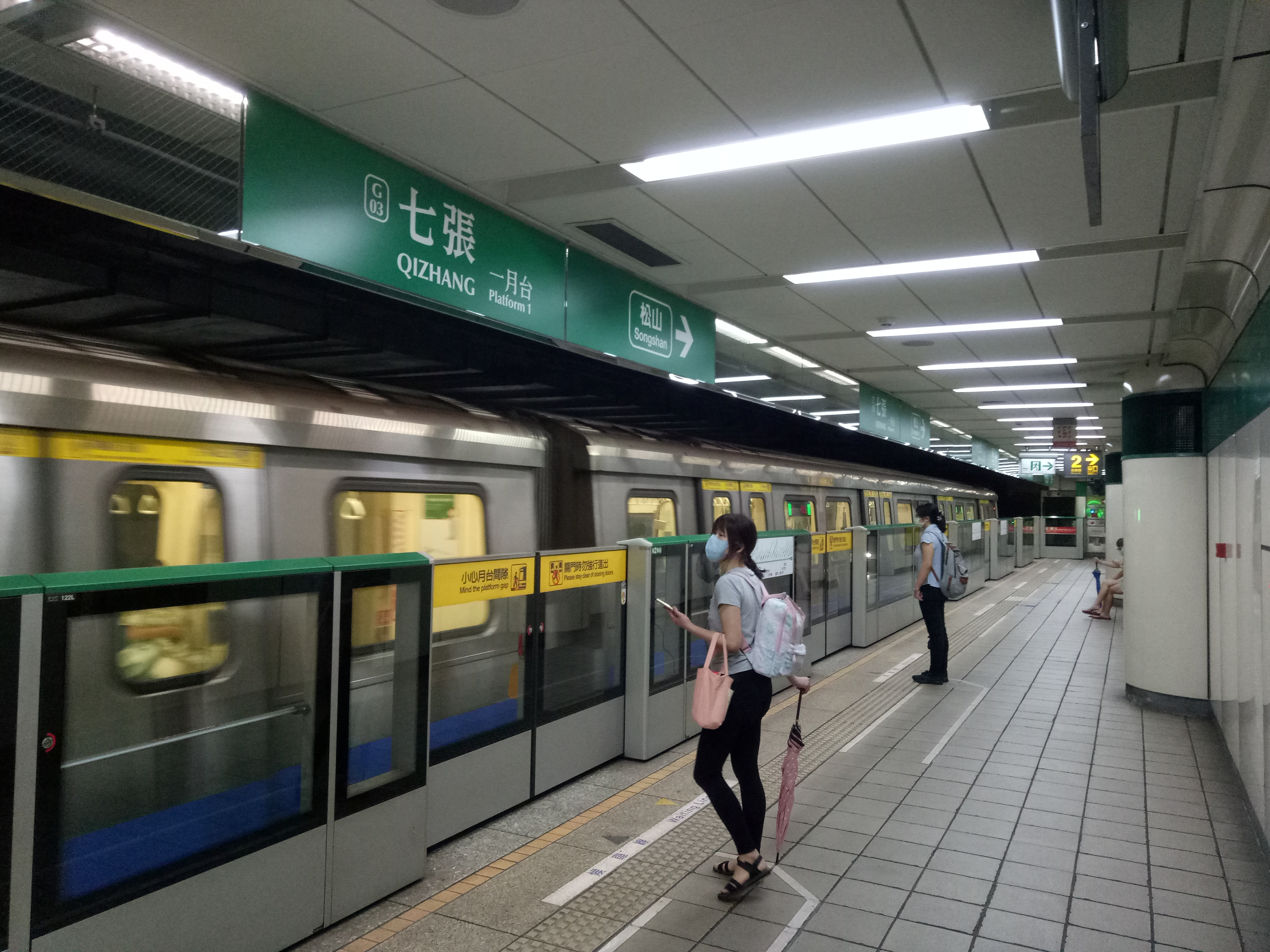
- Platform

Chinese name
- Traditional Chinese: 七張
- Simplified Chinese: 七张
- Literal meaning: Seven sheets
Transcriptions
Standard Mandarin
- Hanyu Pinyin: Qīzhāng
- Bopomofo: ㄑㄧ ㄓㄤ
- Wade–Giles: Ch'i¹-chang¹
Hakka
- Pha̍k-fa-sṳ: Chhit-chông
Southern Min
- Hokkien POJ: Chhit-tiuⁿ
- Tâi-lô: Tshit-tiunn

General information
- Location: No. 150, Sec. 2, Beixin Rd. Xindian, New Taipei; Taiwan
- Coordinates: 24.975073°N 121.543296°E
- Operator: Taipei Metro
- Lines: Songshan–Xindian line; Xiaobitan branch line
- Platforms: 2 side platforms
- Tracks: 2
- Connections: Bus stop

Construction
- Structure type: Underground

Other information
- Station code: G03

History
- Opened: 11 November 1999; 26 years ago

Passengers
- daily (December 2024)
- Rank: 78 out of 109 and 7 others

Services
Preceding station	Taipei Metro	Following station
Dapinglin towards Songshan	Songshan–Xindian line	Xindian District Office towards Xindian
Terminus	Xiaobitan branch line	Xiaobitan Terminus
Location

The Taipei Metro Qizhang station (formerly transliterated as Chichang Station until 2003) is a station on the Songshan–Xindian line located in Xindian District, New Taipei, Taiwan. It is a transfer and terminus of the Xiaobitan branch line.

== Station overview ==
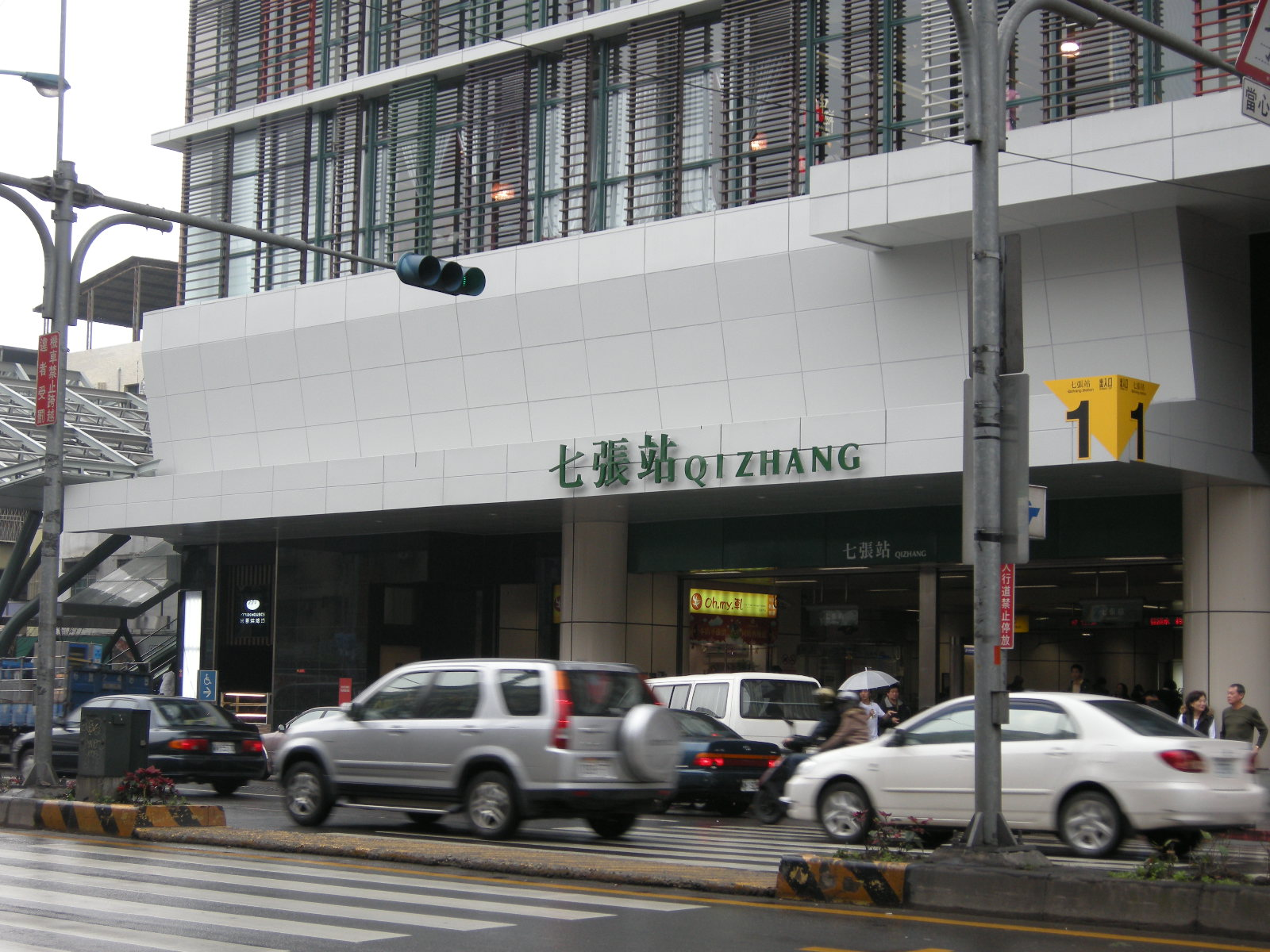
Qizhang station exit 1

This two-level, underground station, has two side platforms and two exits. Trains on the Xiaobitan branch line and Songshan–Xindian line utilize the same platforms.

== Station layout ==
Street level	Concourse	Entrance/exit, lobby, information desk, automatic ticket dispensing machines, one-way faregates Restrooms (west side, inside fare area)
B1
B1	Side platform, doors will open on the right
B1	Platform 1	← Songshan–Xindian line toward Songshan (G04 Dapinglin) ← Xiaobitan branch line terminate platform (no carrying passengers)
B1	Platform 2	→ Songshan–Xindian line toward Xindian (G02 Xindian District Office) → → Xiaobitan branch line toward Xiaobitan (G03A terminus) →
B1	Side platform, doors will open on the right

B2	Connecting level	Platform connecting level
