= Xiaobitan =

Xiaobitan may refer to:

- Xiaobitan branch line, a branch line of the Songshan–Xindian line.
- Xiaobitan metro station, a metro station of the Taipei Metro.
