= Songjiang Nanjing metro station =

Metro station in Zhongshan, Taipei, Taiwan

Songjiang Nanjing / 松江南京
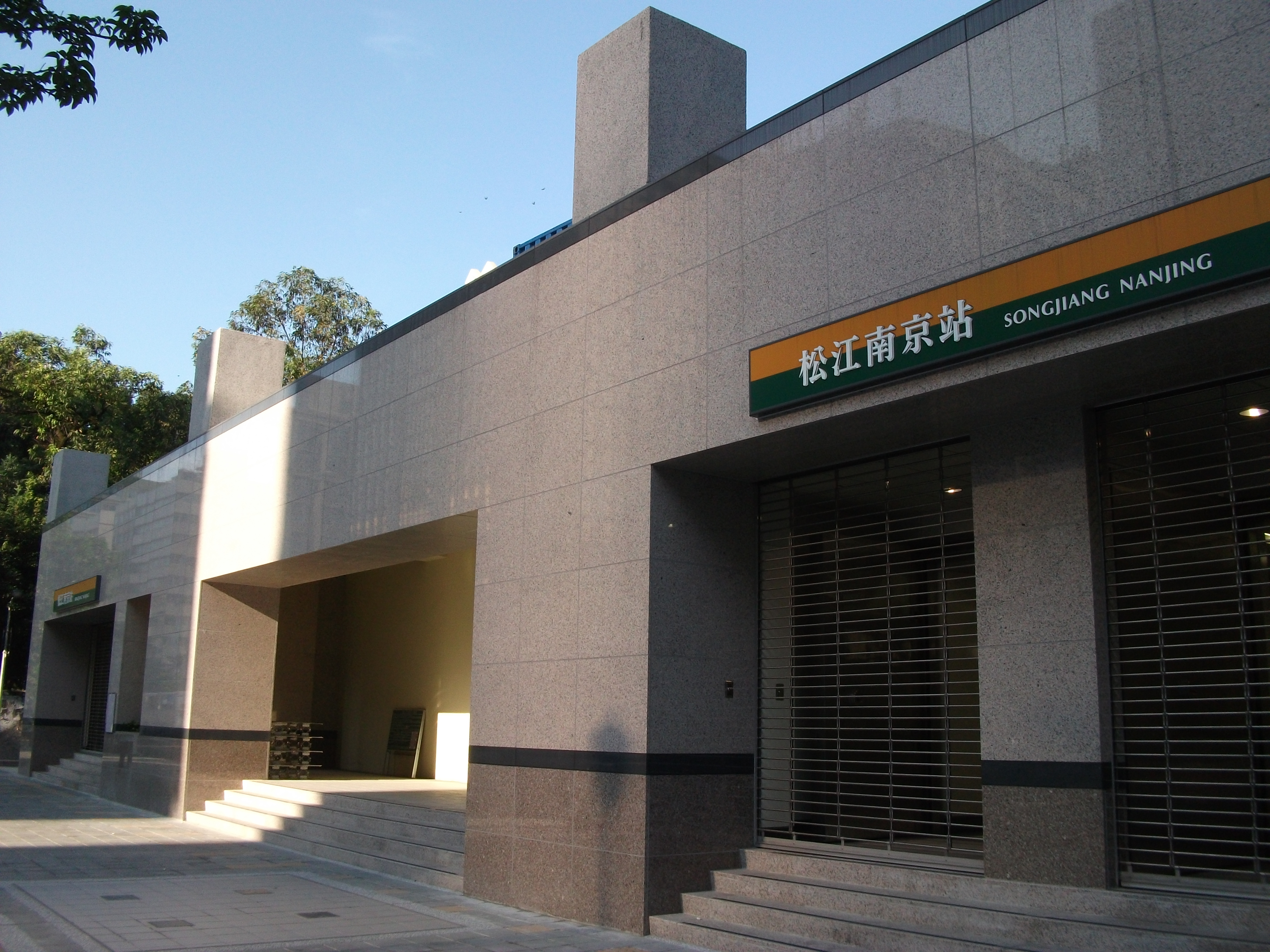
- Entrance

Chinese name
- Chinese: 松江南京
Transcriptions
Standard Mandarin
- Hanyu Pinyin: Sōngjiāng Nánjīng
- Bopomofo: ㄙㄨㄥ ㄐㄧㄤ ㄋㄢˊ ㄐㄧㄥ
Hakka
- Pha̍k-fa-sṳ: Chhiùng-kông Nàm-kîn
Southern Min
- Tâi-lô: Siông-kang Lâm-kiann

General information
- Location: B1F 126 Songjiang Rd; Zhongshan District, Taipei; Taiwan
- Coordinates: 25.0521°N 121.5330°E
- System: Taipei Metro station
- Lines: Songshan–Xindian line Zhonghe–Xinlu line

Construction
- Structure type: Underground
- Cycle facilities: Access available

Other information
- Station code: ,
- Website: web.metro.taipei/e/stationdetail2010.asp?ID=G15+O08-132

History
- Opened: 2010-11-03

Key dates
- 2014-11-15: Songshan–Xindian line added

Passengers
- 2017: 24.320 million per year ▲2.15%
- Rank: (Ranked 10 of 119)

Services
Preceding station	Taipei Metro	Following station
Nanjing Fuxing towards Songshan	Songshan–Xindian line	Zhongshan towards Taipower Building or Xindian
Zhongxiao Xinsheng towards Nanshijiao	Zhonghe–Xinlu line	Xingtian Temple towards Huilong or Luzhou
Location

Songjiang Nanjing (Chinese: 松江南京; pinyin: Sōngjiāng Nánjīng) is a metro station in Taipei, Taiwan served by Taipei Metro. It is a transfer station between the Songshan–Xindian line and Zhonghe–Xinlu line. The station opened on 3 November 2010 for traffic on the Zhonghe–Xinlu line, and Songshan–Xindian line services opened on 15 November 2014.

== Station overview ==
This underground station has an island platform for the Zhonghe-Xinlu line and has two side platforms for the Songshan-Xindian line. It is located beneath the intersection of Songjiang Rd. and Nanjing East Rd. (hence the name of the station), and opened in November 2010 with the opening of the Luzhou Line and the Taipei City section of the Xinzhuang Line.

=== Construction ===
Excavation depth for this station was around 29 meters for the Xinzhuang Line station and 20 meters for the Songshan Line station. The Xinzhuang Line station is 191 meters in length and 32 meters wide, while the Songshan Line station is 202 meters in length and 26 meters wide. It has eight entrances, two accessibility elevators, and four vent shafts. Two of the entrances and a vent shaft are integrated with joint development buildings. One entrance is integrated with the Council for Economic Planning and Development building. The station is equipped with platform screen doors for both lines.

=== Public art ===
The theme for the Songshan Line station is "Metropolitan Images of Daily Life" (都會眾生相). It uses four elements (earth, fire, water, wind) to present surreal situations of the combination of city and nature.

- Earth: Business in the City Jungle
- Fire: University in a Flash
- Water: Office Under the Sea
- Wind: Coffee Shop Floating in the Clouds

=== History ===
On 1 June 2003, construction began. The station was opened on 3 November 2010 for the Zhonghe–Xinlu line, followed by the opening of the Songshan-Xindian line on 15 November 2014.

== Station layout ==
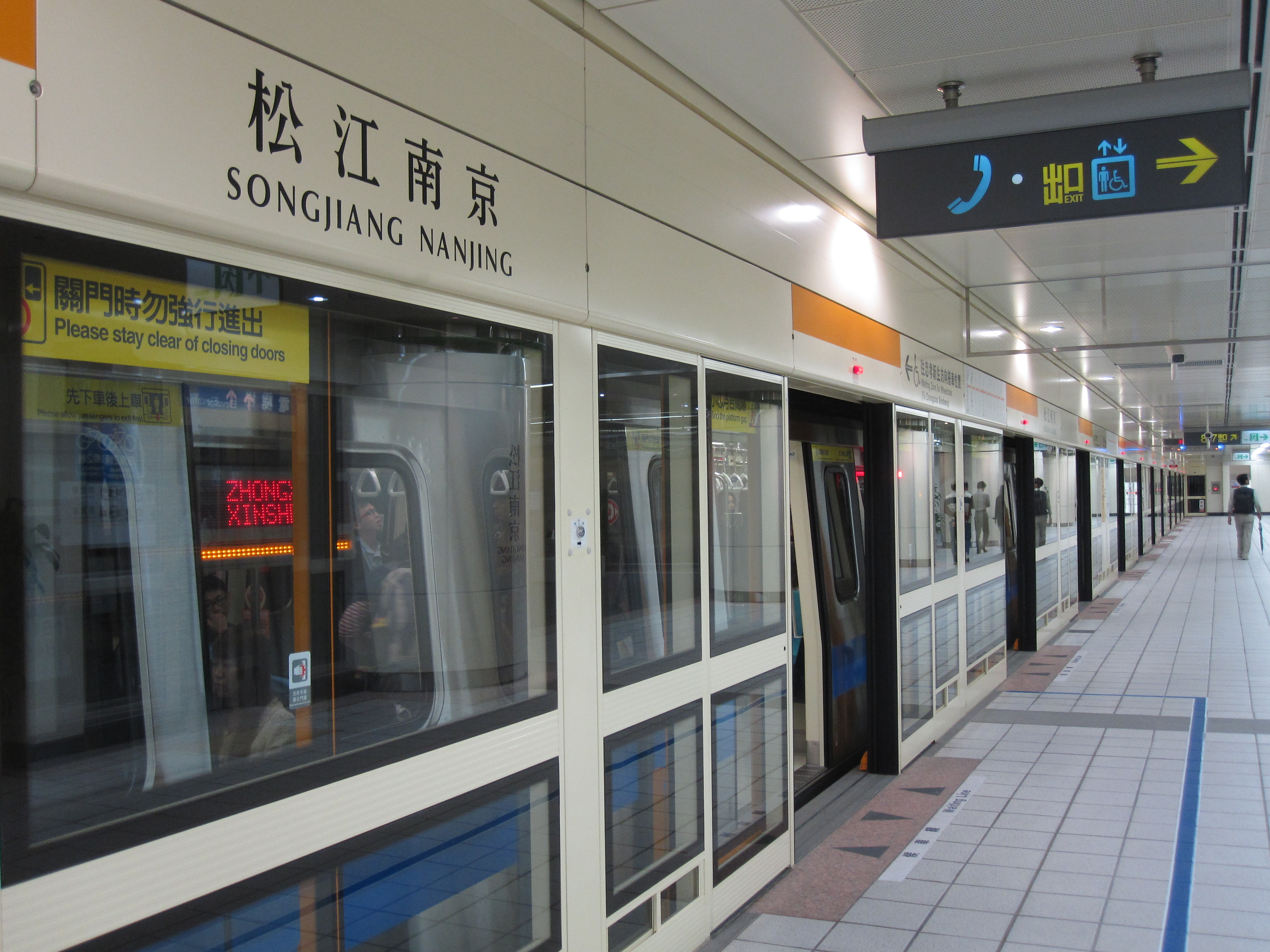
Songjiang Nanjing station platform 2

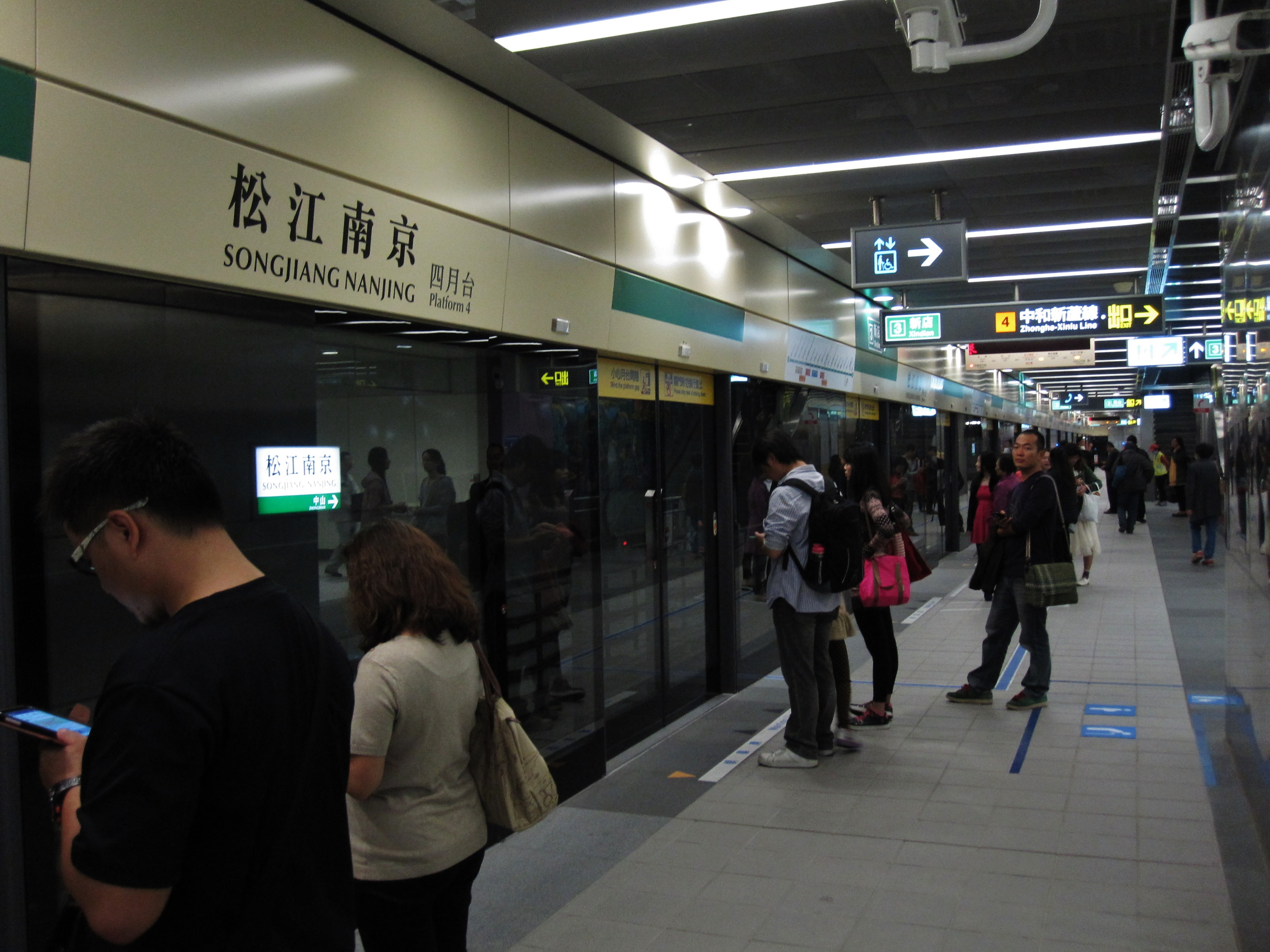
Songjiang Nanjing station platform 4

L1	Street level	Entrance/exit
B1	Concourse	Lobby, information desk, automatic ticket dispensing machines, one-way faregates
B1	Concourse	Restrooms (inside fare zone, outside fare zone near exit 1, 2, 6, 7)
B2	Passage level	Escalators, elevators to concourse and platform levels
B2	Side platform, doors open on the right
B2	Platform 3	← Songshan–Xindian line toward Songshan (G16 Nanjing Fuxing)
B2	Platform 4	→ Songshan–Xindian line toward Xindian / Taipower Building (G14 Zhongshan) →
B2	Side platform, doors open on the right
B2	Passage Level	Escalators, elevators to concourse and platform levels
B4	Platform 1	← Zhonghe–Xinlu line toward Luzhou / Huilong (O09 Xingtian Temple)
B4	Island platform, doors will open on the left
B4	Platform 2	Zhonghe–Xinlu line toward Nanshijiao (O07 Zhongxiao Xinsheng) →

== Around the station ==
- Miniatures Museum of Taiwan
- Suho Memorial Paper Museum
