= Xinxian =

Xinxian may refer to:

- Xin County, county in Henan, China
- Xinfu District, Xinzhou, formerly Xinxian or Xin County, Shanxi, China
- Xinxian, Mengcun County, town in Hebei, China
