= Zhongshan metro station =

Metro station in Zhongshan, Taipei, Taiwan

Zhongshan / 中山
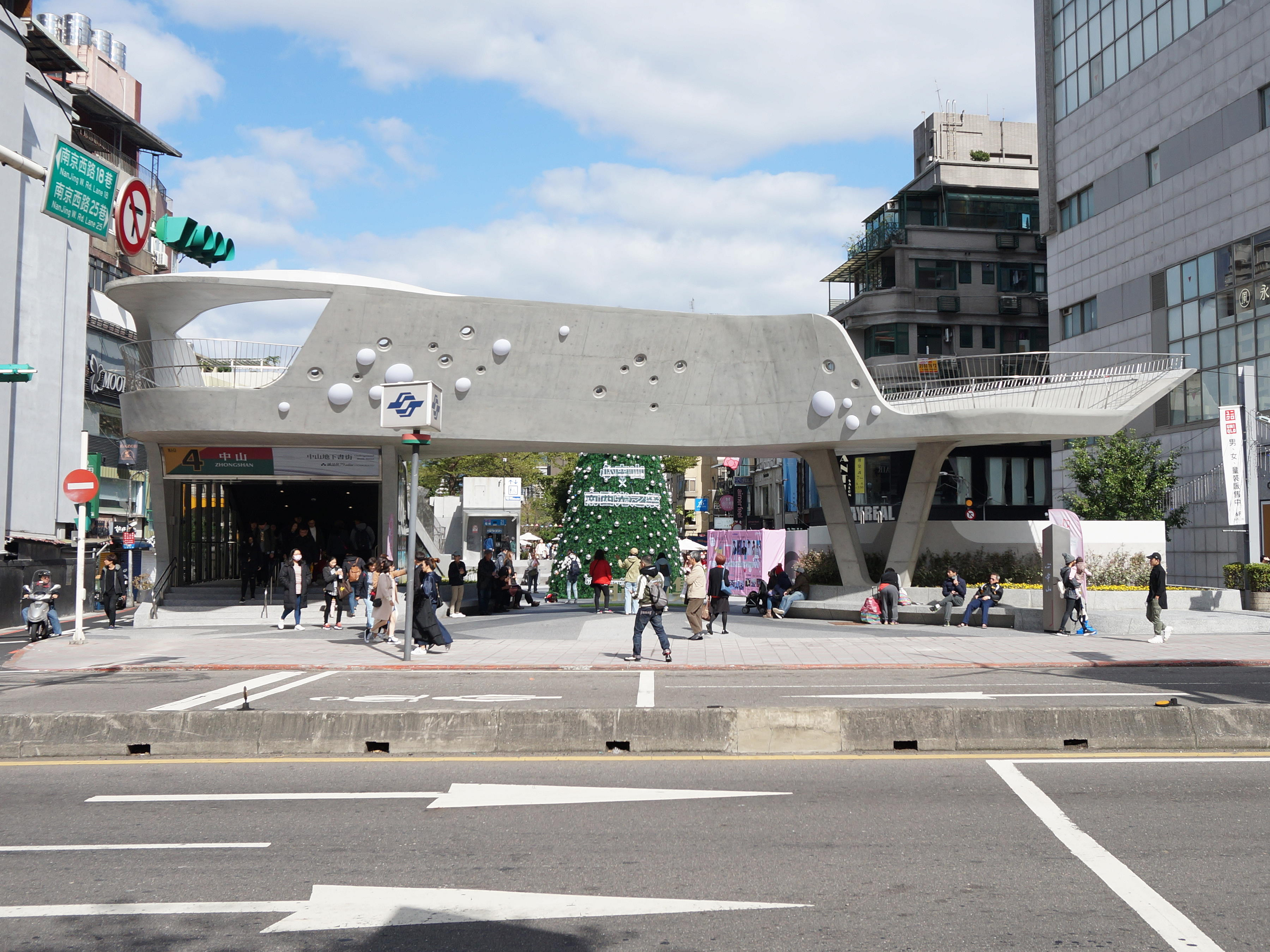
- Exit 4

Chinese name
- Chinese: 中山
Transcriptions
Standard Mandarin
- Hanyu Pinyin: Zhōngshān
- Bopomofo: ㄓㄨㄥ ㄕㄢ
- Wade–Giles: Chung¹-shan¹
Hakka
- Pha̍k-fa-sṳ: Chûng-sân
Southern Min
- Tâi-lô: Tiong-san

General information
- Location: 16 Nanjing W Rd; Zhongshan, Taipei (R); Taiwan
- Coordinates: 25.0526°N 121.5204°E
- System: Taipei Metro station
- Lines: Tamsui–Xinyi line Songshan–Xindian line

Construction
- Structure type: Underground
- Cycle facilities: No access

Other information
- Station code: ,
- Website: web.metro.taipei/e/stationdetail2010.asp?ID=G14+R11-053

History
- Opened: 1997-03-28

Key dates
- November 15, 2014; 11 years ago: Songshan–Xindian line added

Passengers
- 2017: 28.072 million per year ▲0.93%
- Rank: (Ranked 4 of 119)

Services
Preceding station	Taipei Metro	Following station
Taipei Main Station towards Xiangshan or Daan	Tamsui–Xinyi line	Shuanglian towards Tamsui or Beitou
Songjiang Nanjing towards Songshan	Songshan–Xindian line	Beimen towards Taipower Building or Xindian
Location

Zhongshan (Chinese: 中山, formerly transliterated as Chungshan Station until 2003) is a metro station in Taipei, Taiwan, served by Taipei Metro. It is a transfer station between the Tamsui–Xinyi and Songshan–Xindian lines. It is located in the middle of the underground Zhongshan Metro Mall and near the Shin Kong Mitsukoshi Department Store. Zhongshan is a popular shopping district for young people and international tourists.

== Station overview ==
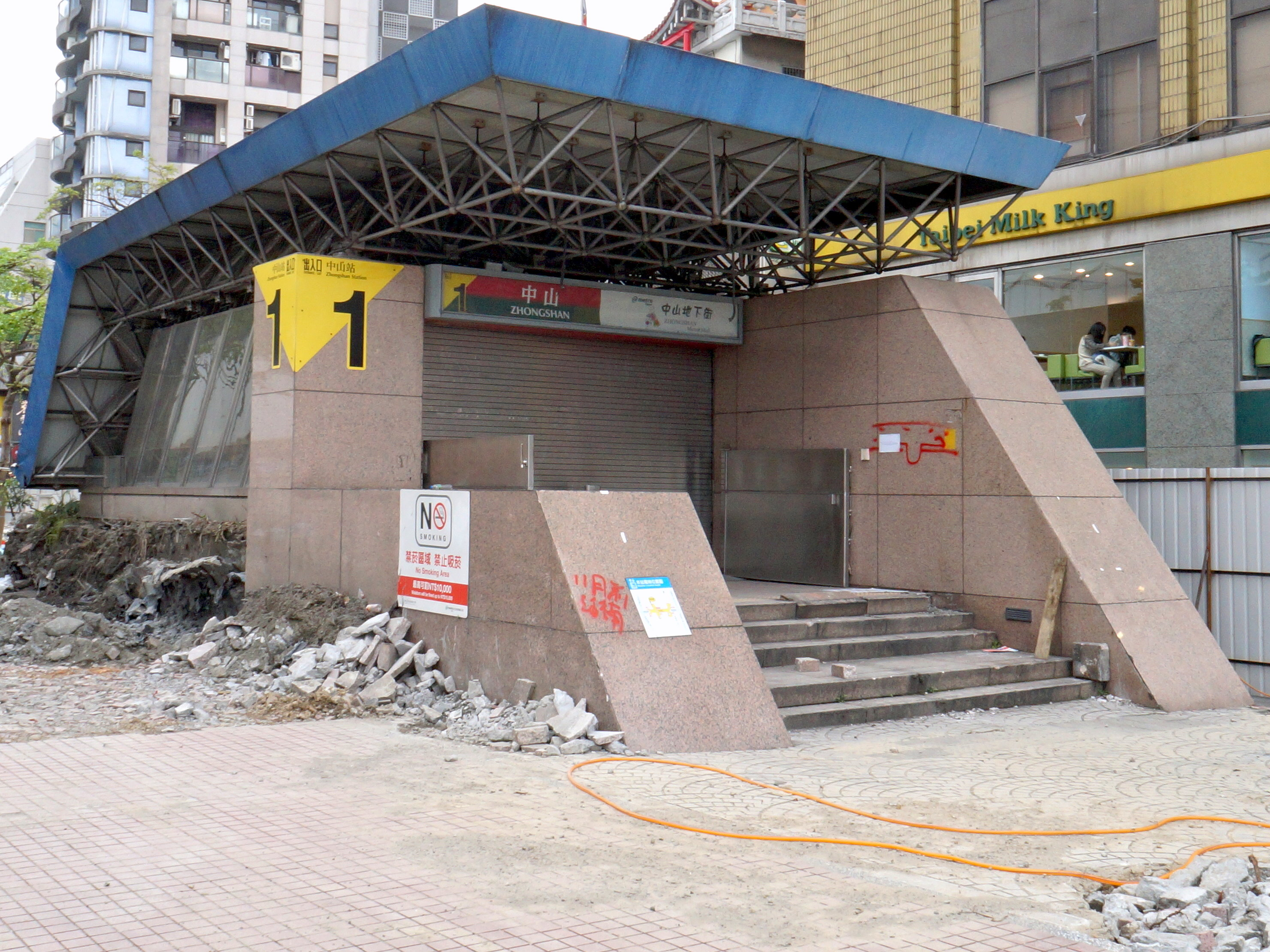
Exit 1

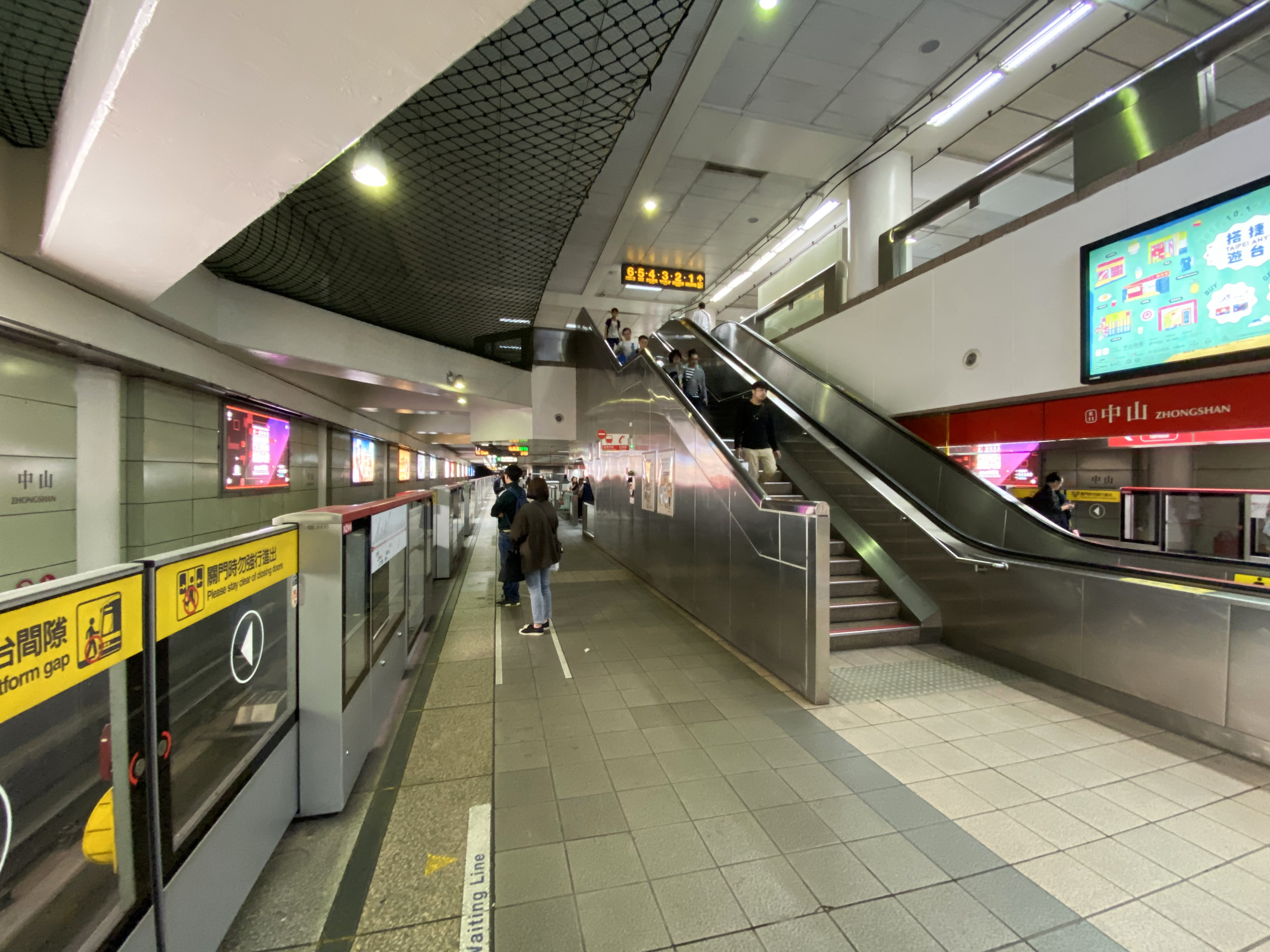
Red line platform

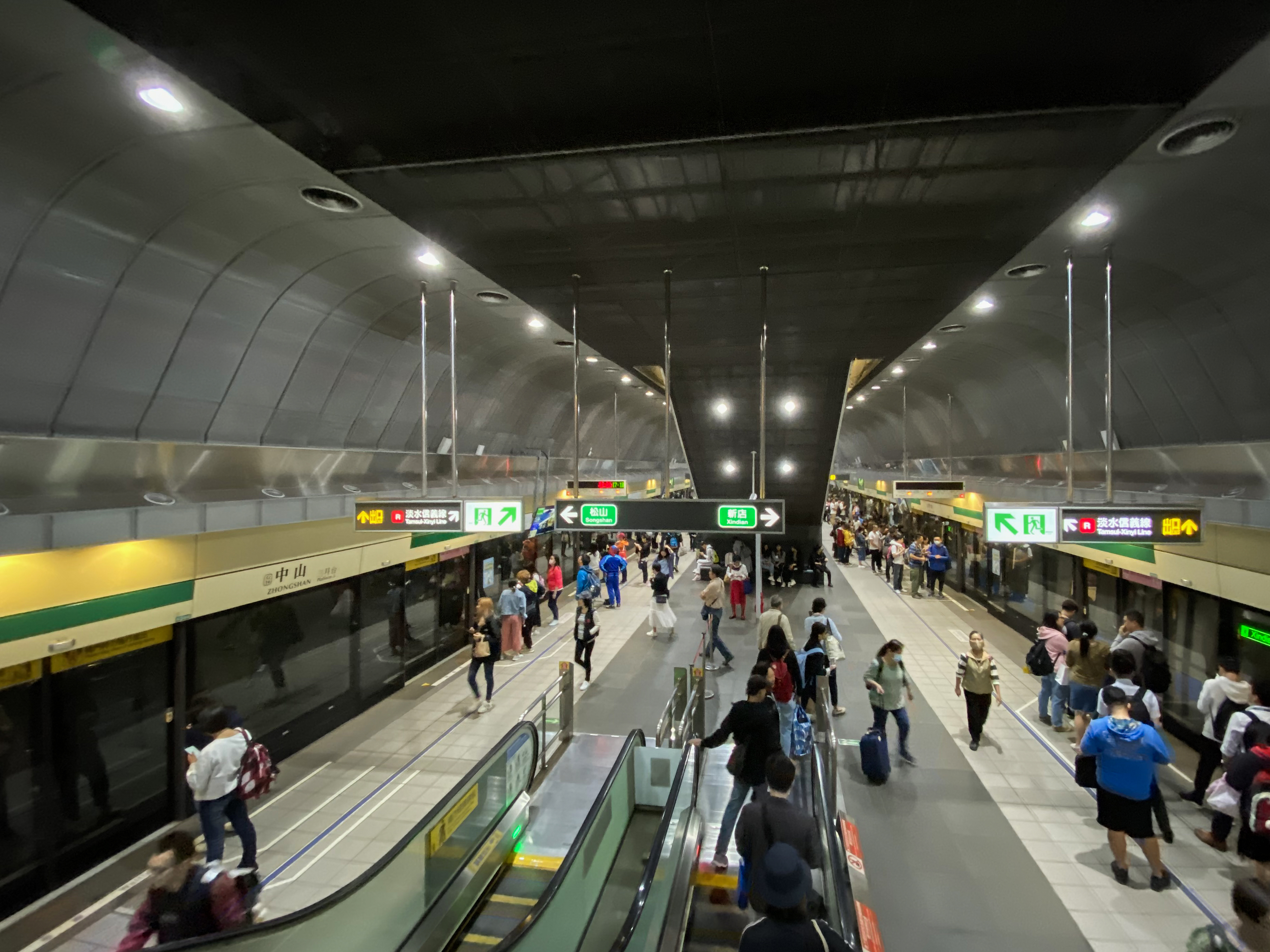
Green line platform

The station is an underground structure with an island platform, and had four exits when Tamsui line opened. It is located at the intersection of Nanjing West Rd. and the Metro Park (near Chengde Rd. and Zhongshan North Rd.). It is also a transfer station with the Songshan line.

The Songshan line station added two additional exits and renovated two existing exits. The station is a four-level, underground station. The Songshan line station is 26 m (85 ft) deep and 176 m (577 ft) long and 23 m (75 ft) meters wide.

Exit 4 was recently reconstructed with transparent, self-cleaning glass to better integrate with nearby department stores.

=== Public art ===
The new Songshan line station has a theme of "Happy Transit".

== History ==
The station was opened on March 28, 1997, as a terminus station of the Tamsui line until December 25, 1997. On November 15, 2014, Songshan line opened.

On July 20, 2015, there was a knife attack injuring four.

== Station layout ==
Street level	Street level	Entrance/exit, Metro Park
B1	Concourse	Lobby, information desk, automatic ticket dispensing machines, one-way faregates
B1	Concourse	Zhongshan Art Corridor, Zhongshan Metro Mall (south side of station); Restroms (inside mall)
B2	Platform 1	← Tamsui–Xinyi line toward Tamsui / Beitou (R12 Shuanglian)
B2	Island platform, doors will open on the left
B2	Platform 2	Tamsui–Xinyi line toward Xiangshan / Daan (R10 Taipei Main Station) →
B3	Passage level	Escalators, elevators to concourse and platform levels
B4	Platform 3	← Songshan–Xindian line toward Songshan (G15 Songjiang Nanjing)
B4	Island platform, doors will open on the left
B4	Platform 4	Songshan–Xindian Line toward Xindian / Taipower Building (G13 Beimen) →

== Other metro services ==
The station is an entrance to the Zhongshan Metro Mall, connecting (between this station and Shuanglian station).

== Around the station ==
- Linsen Park
- Museum of Contemporary Art Taipei
