= Sindian =

Sindian or Xindian refers to several places:

- Sindian Arrondissement, Senegal
- Sindian, Senegal, a town in Senegal
- Xindian District, Taiwan
- Xindian Line (Taipei Metro), Taiwan
- Xindian River, Taiwan

== See also ==
- Xindian (disambiguation)
