= Xindian station =

Xindian station may refer to:

- Xindian metro station, a metro station in Taipei, Taiwan
- Xindian station (Hohhot Metro), a metro station in Hohhot, China

== See also ==
- Xindian District Office metro station, a metro station in Taipei, Taiwan
