= Renze, Xingtai =

Renze 任泽区
- District
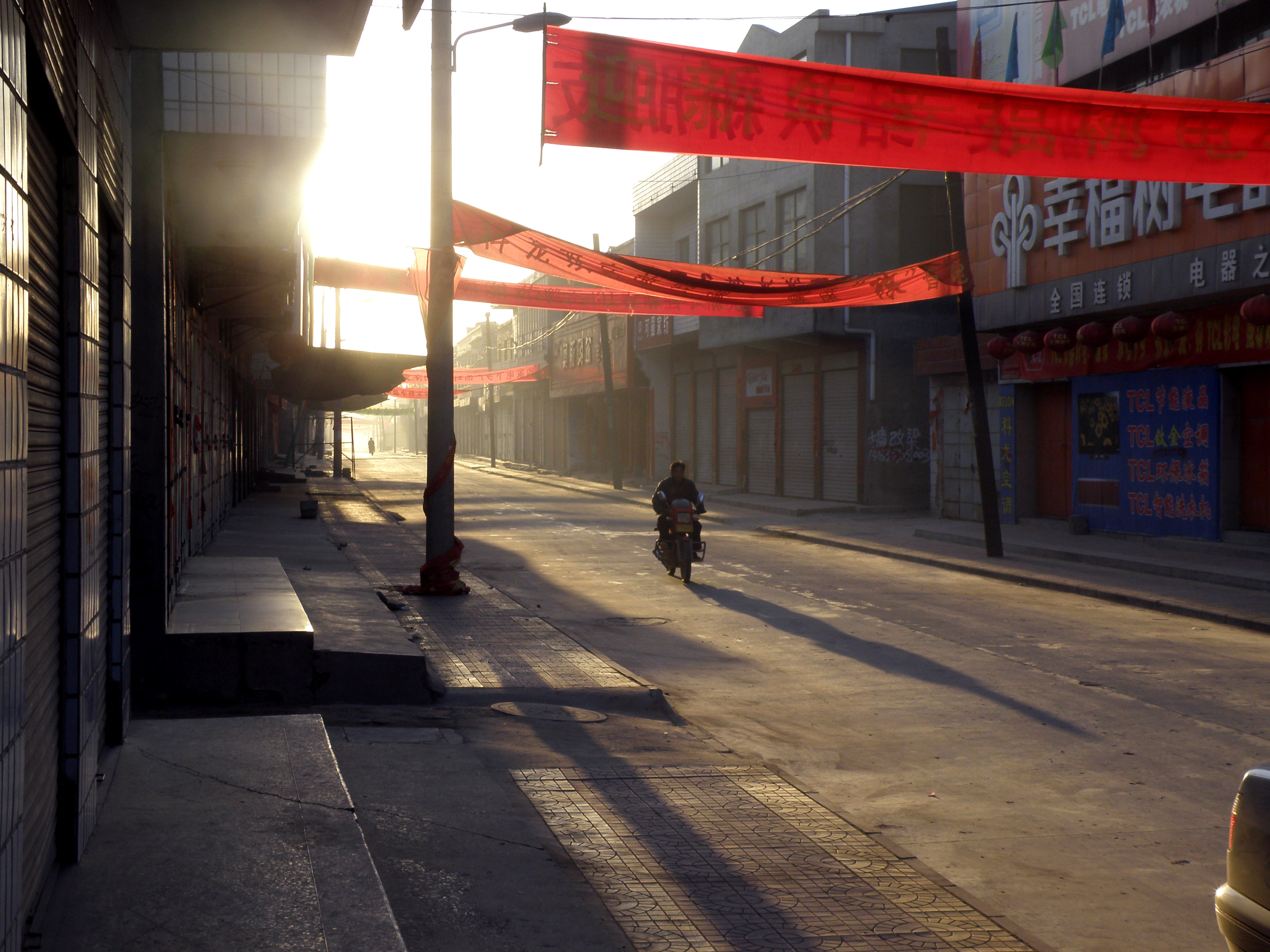

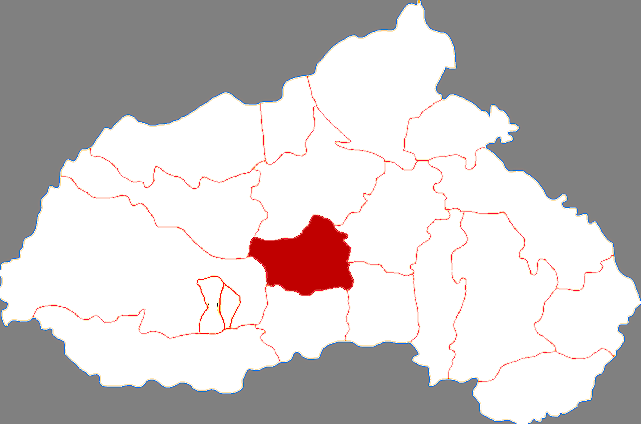
- Renze District in Xingtai

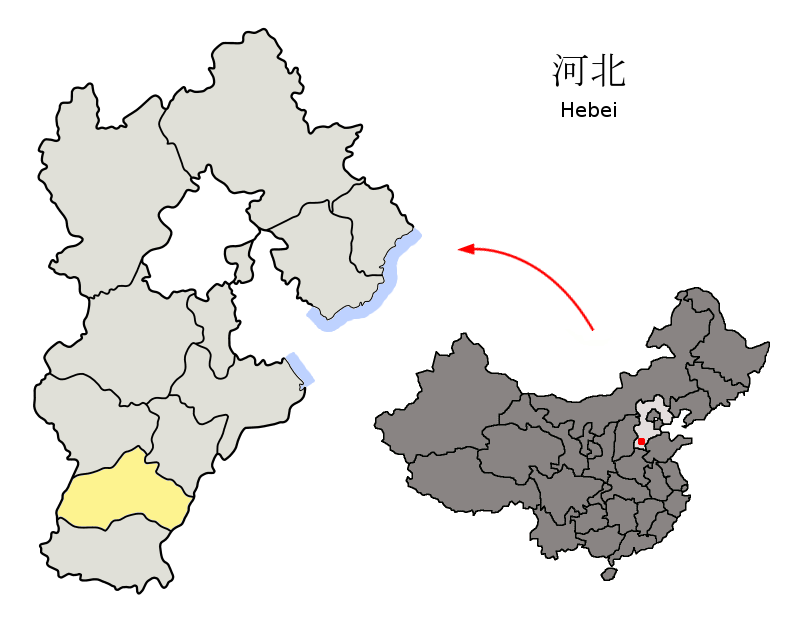
- Xingtai in Hebei
- Coordinates: 37°07′16″N 114°40′19″E
- Country: People's Republic of China
- Province: Hebei
- Prefecture-level city: Xingtai
- Time zone: UTC+8 (China Standard)

Renze District (Chinese: 任泽区; pinyin: Rénzé qū), formerly known as Ren County (simplified Chinese: 任县; traditional Chinese: 任縣; pinyin: Rén xiàn) before June 2020, is a district in the southwest of Hebei province, China. It is under the administration of the prefecture-level city of Xingtai. It has a land area of 431 km^{2} (166 sq mi) and a population of 300,000. Its postal code is 055150. The county seat is located in Rencheng Town.

== Administrative divisions ==
Renze consists of 3 towns and 5 townships.

Towns:

- Rencheng (任城镇), Xingjiawan (邢家湾镇), Xindian (辛店镇)

Townships:

- Luozhuang Township (骆庄乡), Tiankou Township (天口乡), Datun Township (大屯乡), Yongfuzhuang Township (永福庄乡), Xigucheng Township (固城乡)

== Climate ==
Climate data for Renze, elevation 37 m (121 ft), (1991–2020 normals, extremes 1981–present)
Month	Jan	Feb	Mar	Apr	May	Jun	Jul	Aug	Sep	Oct	Nov	Dec	Year
Record high °C (°F)	18.5 (65.3)	26.5 (79.7)	32.4 (90.3)	35.4 (95.7)	40.4 (104.7)	42.8 (109.0)	42.3 (108.1)	37.0 (98.6)	37.8 (100.0)	33.3 (91.9)	27.4 (81.3)	25.0 (77.0)	42.8 (109.0)
Mean daily maximum °C (°F)	3.8 (38.8)	8.2 (46.8)	15.2 (59.4)	21.8 (71.2)	27.5 (81.5)	32.8 (91.0)	32.7 (90.9)	30.8 (87.4)	27.2 (81.0)	21.4 (70.5)	12.1 (53.8)	5.3 (41.5)	19.9 (67.8)
Daily mean °C (°F)	−2.5 (27.5)	1.5 (34.7)	8.3 (46.9)	15.2 (59.4)	21.1 (70.0)	26.1 (79.0)	27.4 (81.3)	25.6 (78.1)	20.9 (69.6)	14.5 (58.1)	5.9 (42.6)	−0.6 (30.9)	13.6 (56.5)
Mean daily minimum °C (°F)	−7.3 (18.9)	−3.8 (25.2)	2.3 (36.1)	9.0 (48.2)	14.8 (58.6)	20.1 (68.2)	23.0 (73.4)	21.4 (70.5)	16.0 (60.8)	9.1 (48.4)	1.0 (33.8)	−5.0 (23.0)	8.4 (47.1)
Record low °C (°F)	−21.8 (−7.2)	−22.1 (−7.8)	−9.9 (14.2)	−3.0 (26.6)	3.0 (37.4)	10.0 (50.0)	16.5 (61.7)	13.3 (55.9)	5.0 (41.0)	−3.1 (26.4)	−15.2 (4.6)	−19.2 (−2.6)	−22.1 (−7.8)
Average precipitation mm (inches)	2.4 (0.09)	6.3 (0.25)	8.4 (0.33)	26.7 (1.05)	43.9 (1.73)	51.6 (2.03)	143.2 (5.64)	115.5 (4.55)	55.1 (2.17)	23.9 (0.94)	14.6 (0.57)	2.8 (0.11)	494.4 (19.46)
Average precipitation days (≥ 0.1 mm)	1.7	2.7	2.5	5.5	6.5	8.4	11.1	9.8	7.0	5.5	4.2	1.9	66.8
Average snowy days	2.9	2.7	1.0	0.2	0	0	0	0	0	0	1.3	2.6	10.7
Average relative humidity (%)	63	59	54	60	63	60	76	82	76	69	71	68	67
Mean monthly sunshine hours	135.3	150.8	202.0	225.3	244.5	217.7	179.4	187.3	180.2	169.2	136.2	137.6	2,165.5
Percentage possible sunshine	44	49	54	57	56	50	40	45	49	49	45	46	49
Source: China Meteorological Administration
