= Miniatures Museum of Taiwan =

- 袖珍博物館
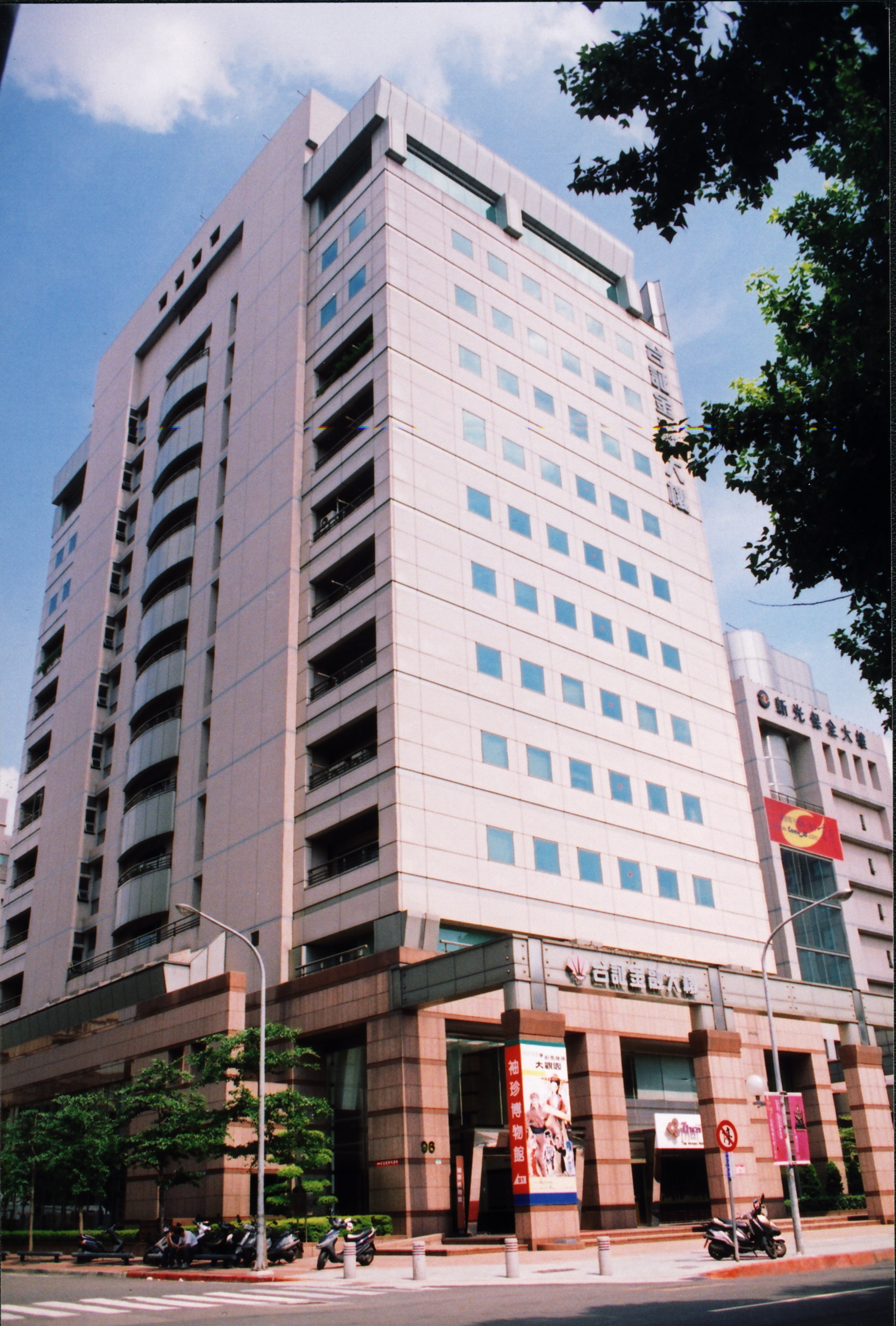
- Miniatures Museum of Taiwan in Taiwan Securities Financial Building (台証金融大樓)
- Established: 28 March 1997
- Location: Zhongshan, Taipei, Taiwan
- Coordinates: 25°03′01.0″N 121°32′11.0″E
- Type: Museum
- Public transit access: Songjiang Nanjing MRT station
- Website: www.mmot.com.tw

The Miniatures Museum of Taiwan (Chinese: 袖珍博物館; pinyin: Xiùzhēn Bówùguǎn)is the first museum to collect miniatures in Asia. The museum was founded on March 28, 1997, by Mr. Lin Wen-ren and his wife. It is located in Zhongshan District, Taipei, Taiwan.

Mr. Lin and his wife enjoyed buying little houses and toy cars for their children while traveling for business purposes. While in The Netherlands, they discovered miniature art and were deeply attracted. They began buying accessories, furniture, and assembled miniature houses. At the same time, the couple participated in auctions and joined international miniature art associations. They began planning their museum in 1993.

The logo of the museum comes from "Rose Mansion", one of the museum's most famed collections. Chosen as one of ten most significant miniature art works of America in twenty-five years, "Rose Mansion" consumed Dr. Reginald Twigg almost four years to complete. After his elaborate research and study the once famous architecture has been brought back to life as you now see in the museum. The logo represents delicate, real, dream-like, romantic, and historically correct nature of miniature arts.

Miniatures originated within German palaces of the 16th century as tools for teaching aristocratic children, but appreciation for the art form did not pass to other parts of the world until much later during the 19th century. Today, miniature masterpieces are found throughout Europe and North America covering subjects from complete settings to intricate accessories of tableware and wall paintings. Reproductions tend to follow a 1:12 standard scale of accuracy, or half scale at 1:24.

Taiwan's museum is the first to specialize in contemporary miniatures and features two formats: "doll house" and room box with cut away views. It is ranked second in the world, with a collection of nearly 200 items. Founder Lin Wen-Ren and his wife sourced each item while travelling in Europe and the United States.

== Features ==
The museum has many exhibitions on miniature buildings such as those of English architecture, and Roman castles. Miniature models of fairy tales can also be seen, such as those from Alice in Wonderland, Pinocchio, and Jack and the Beanstalk. The museum also features the smallest working television in the world, as well as miniature cakes and cubed worlds.

== Ticket Prices ==
Ticket prices are as follows:

Adults (Age 18 and over): NT$200

Teenagers (Age 13 to 17): NT$160

Children (Age 6 to 12): NT$120

Those under 6 can enter for free.

== Transportation ==
The museum is accessible within walking distance East from Songjiang Nanjing Station of the Taipei Metro.

== Opening Hours ==
The museum is open from 10AM to 6PM, from Tuesday to Sunday, and closed during the Lunar New Year.

== See also ==
- List of museums in Taiwan
