= Energy Administration =

Government agency based in Zhongshan, Taipei, Taiwan

- 經濟部能源署

Agency overview
- Formed: July 1968 (as Energy Development Group); 1 July 2004 (as BOE); 26 September 2023 (as EA)
- Preceding agencies: Energy Development Group; Energy Policy Deliberation Group; Energy Commission
- Jurisdiction: Republic of China
- Headquarters: Zhongshan, Taipei, Taiwan; 25°02′52.5″N 121°32′37.3″E
- Agency executive: Yu Cheng-wei, Director-General
- Parent agency: Ministry of Economic Affairs
- Website: Official website

Energy Administration
- Traditional Chinese: 經濟部能源署
- Simplified Chinese: 经济部能源署
Transcriptions

The Energy Administration (EA; Chinese: 經濟部能源署) is the administrative agency of the Ministry of Economic Affairs of the Republic of China (Taiwan) responsible for energy-related affairs.

== History ==
The BOE was originally established as Energy Development Group in July 1968 under the International Economic Cooperation and Development Council of the Executive Yuan. In January 1970, the group was renamed the Energy Policy Deliberation Group and became a subordinate of the Ministry of Economic Affairs. On 1 November 1979, the Energy Commission was established under the ministry. On 1 July 2004, the Bureau of Energy was established. It was renamed the Energy Administration in 2023.

== Organizational structure ==
- Planning Division
- Petroleum and Gas Division
- Electricity Division
- Energy Technology Division
- Secretariat
- Personnel Office
- Accounting Office
- Civil Service Ethics Office
- Legal Affairs Office

== Director-generals ==
- Wang Yunn-ming
- Yu Cheng-wei (incumbent)

== Transportation ==
The bureau is accessible within walking distance south of Nanjing Fuxing Station of Taipei Metro.

== See also ==
- Ministry of Economic Affairs (Taiwan)
- Nuclear power in Taiwan
