= Mengcun Hui Autonomous County =

Mengcun County 孟村县 · مٍْ‌ڞٌ ثِیًا
- Autonomous county
- 孟村回族自治县 · مٍْ‌ڞٌ خُوِزُو زِجِ‌ثِیًا; Mengcun Hui Autonomous County
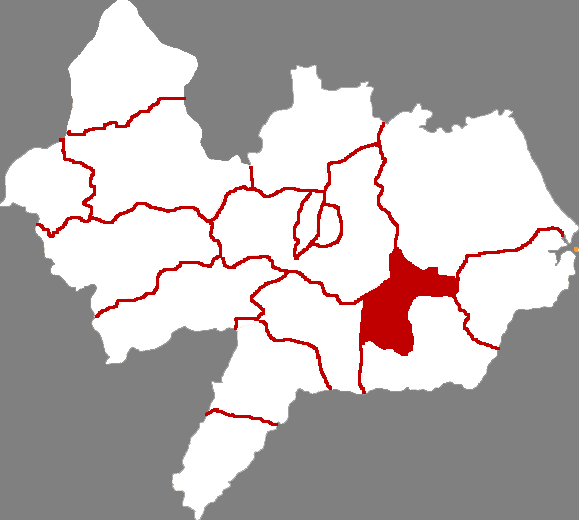
- Mengcun in Cangzhou

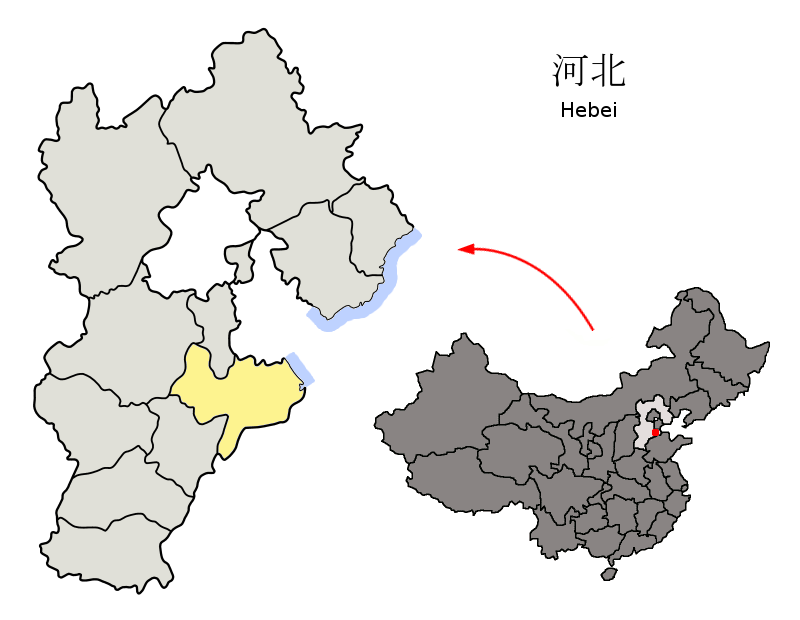
- Cangzhou in Hebei
- Coordinates: 38°03′11″N 117°06′14″E
- Country: People's Republic of China
- Province: Hebei
- Prefecture-level city: Cangzhou
- County seat: Mengcun Town (孟村镇)

Area
  - Total: 384 km^{2} (148 sq mi)
- Elevation: 13 m (43 ft)

Population (2020)
  - Total: 203,507
  - Density: 530/km^{2} (1,370/sq mi)
- Time zone: UTC+8 (China Standard)
- Postal code: 061400
- Area code: 0317

Mengcun (Chinese: 孟村回族自治县; pinyin: Mèngcūn huízú zìzhìxiàn; Xiao'erjing: مٍْ‌ڞٌ خُوِزُو زِجِ‌ثِیًا) is a Hui autonomous county of southeastern Hebei province, China, under the administration of Cangzhou City. As of 2020, it has a population of 203,507 residing in an area of 384 km^{2} (148 sq mi).

== Administrative divisions ==
There are 4 towns and 2 townships under the county's administration.

Towns:

- Mengcun (孟村镇), Xinxian (新县镇), Xindian (辛店镇), Gaozhai (高寨镇)

Townships:

- Songzhuangzi Township (宋庄子乡), Niujinzhuang Township (牛进庄乡)

== Climate ==
Climate data for Mengcun, elevation 11 m (36 ft), (1991–2020 normals, extremes 1981–2010)
Month	Jan	Feb	Mar	Apr	May	Jun	Jul	Aug	Sep	Oct	Nov	Dec	Year
Record high °C (°F)	16.9 (62.4)	22.4 (72.3)	30.3 (86.5)	30.8 (87.4)	38.4 (101.1)	42.6 (108.7)	40.7 (105.3)	35.9 (96.6)	34.3 (93.7)	31.6 (88.9)	25.5 (77.9)	17.1 (62.8)	42.6 (108.7)
Mean daily maximum °C (°F)	3.0 (37.4)	6.9 (44.4)	13.7 (56.7)	20.8 (69.4)	26.8 (80.2)	31.7 (89.1)	32.1 (89.8)	30.4 (86.7)	27.1 (80.8)	20.7 (69.3)	11.6 (52.9)	4.5 (40.1)	19.1 (66.4)
Daily mean °C (°F)	−3.4 (25.9)	0.1 (32.2)	6.7 (44.1)	13.9 (57.0)	20.1 (68.2)	25.2 (77.4)	27.0 (80.6)	25.5 (77.9)	20.8 (69.4)	13.9 (57.0)	5.4 (41.7)	−1.4 (29.5)	12.8 (55.1)
Mean daily minimum °C (°F)	−8.3 (17.1)	−5.0 (23.0)	0.9 (33.6)	7.6 (45.7)	13.5 (56.3)	19.1 (66.4)	22.6 (72.7)	21.3 (70.3)	15.4 (59.7)	8.5 (47.3)	0.5 (32.9)	−5.9 (21.4)	7.5 (45.5)
Record low °C (°F)	−21.2 (−6.2)	−18.4 (−1.1)	−12.8 (9.0)	−6.8 (19.8)	1.4 (34.5)	9.5 (49.1)	16.2 (61.2)	11.5 (52.7)	3.1 (37.6)	−4.0 (24.8)	−16.3 (2.7)	−21.9 (−7.4)	−21.9 (−7.4)
Average precipitation mm (inches)	2.4 (0.09)	7.0 (0.28)	7.9 (0.31)	21.8 (0.86)	32.2 (1.27)	68.7 (2.70)	173.0 (6.81)	144.8 (5.70)	36.1 (1.42)	33.8 (1.33)	13.4 (0.53)	3.4 (0.13)	544.5 (21.43)
Average precipitation days (≥ 0.1 mm)	1.4	2.5	2.9	5.2	5.7	7.9	11.4	9.2	5.9	4.7	3.6	2.0	62.4
Average snowy days	2.5	2.4	0.8	0.1	0	0	0	0	0	0	1.0	1.9	8.7
Average relative humidity (%)	60	57	54	58	62	63	77	82	74	67	68	64	66
Mean monthly sunshine hours	169.8	174.7	227.5	240.1	270.0	238.3	196.6	204.5	211.7	196.2	164.0	160.4	2,453.8
Percentage possible sunshine	55	57	61	60	61	54	44	49	57	57	55	54	55
Source: China Meteorological Administration
