= Datun Township, Ren County =

Datun Township 大屯乡
- Rural Township
- Dàtún Xiāng
- Location in Hebei Location in China
- Coordinates: 37°10′24″N 114°39′36″E
- Country: People's Republic of China
- Province: Hebei
- Prefecture-level city: Xingtai
- District: Renze

Area
  - Total: 63.07 km^{2} (24.35 sq mi)

Population (2010)
  - Total: 46,276
  - Density: 733.7/km^{2} (1,900/sq mi)
- Time zone: UTC+8 (China Standard)

Datun Township (Chinese: 大屯乡; pinyin: Dàtún Xiāng) is a rural township located in Renze District, Xingtai, Hebei, China. According to the 2010 census, Datun Township had a population of 46,276, including 23,636 males and 22,640 females. The population was distributed as follows: 8,238 people aged under 14, 35,007 people aged between 15 and 64, and 3,031 people aged over 65.

== See also ==
- List of township-level divisions of Hebei
