= Xindian, Mengcun County =

Xindian
- Town

Chinese transcription(s)
  - Chinese: 辛店镇
  - Pinyin: Xīndiàn Zhèn
- Country: China
- Province: Hebei
- Prefecture: Cangzhou
- Autonomous County: Mengcun Hui
- Time zone: UTC+8 (China Standard Time)

Xindian (Chinese: 辛店镇; pinyin: Xīndiàn Zhèn) is a township-level division situated in Mengcun Hui Autonomous County, Cangzhou, Hebei, China.

== See also ==
- List of township-level divisions of Hebei
