= Xiaobitan Branch Line =

Metro line in Taipei, Taiwan

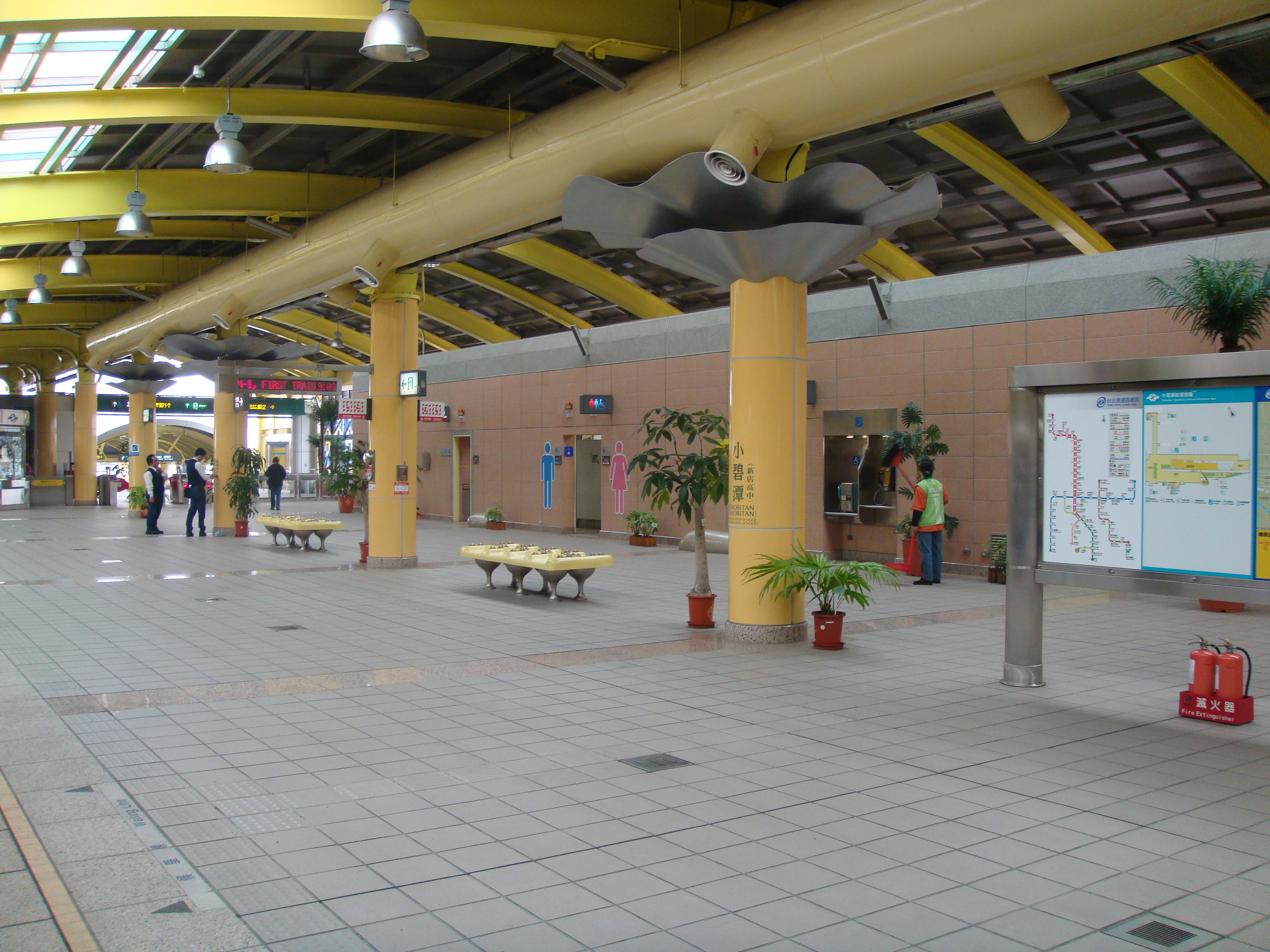
- Xiaobitan station concourse

Overview
- Native name: 小碧潭支線
- Locale: New Taipei, Taiwan
- Termini: Qizhang; Xiaobitan
- Stations: 2
- Color on map: Light green

Service
- Type: Medium-capacity rail transit
- Operator: Taipei Rapid Transit Corporation
- Depot: Xindian
- Rolling stock: C371 (3-car)

History
- Opened: 29 September 2004; 22 years ago

Technical
- Line length: 1.9 km (1.2 mi)
- Num of tracks: 2
- Character: Elevated and underground
- Track gauge: 1,435 mm (4 ft 8 1/2 in) standard gauge
- Electrification: 750 V DC third rail
- Operating speed: 65 km/h (40 mph)

Xiaobitan Branch Line
- Traditional Chinese: 小碧潭支線
- Simplified Chinese: 小碧潭支线
Transcriptions
Standard Mandarin
- Hanyu Pinyin: Xiǎobìtán Zhīxiàn
- Wade–Giles: Hsiao^{3}-pi^{4}-t'an^{2} Chih^{1}-hsien^{4}
- Tongyong Pinyin: Siǎobìtán Jhihsiàn
Southern Min
- Hokkien POJ: Sió-pek-thâm Chi-soàⁿ

The Xiaobitan Branch Line (Chinese: 小碧潭支線) is an elevated branch line of the Songshan–Xindian Line on the Taipei Metro. It functions as a light metro, with a single C371 train set of three cars being used. Xiaobitan station itself is built inside the Xindian Depot. The branch line is 1.9 km (1.2 mi) long and has two stations.

== History ==
- 24 September 2004: Xiaobitan Line opens for free trials.
- 29 September 2004: Xiaobitan Line begins revenue service.
- 22 July 2006: A three-car train set built especially for the Xiaobitan Branch Line begins operations.
- 6 October 2007: Due to strong winds from Typhoon Krosa, service is temporarily suspended from 3:30 PM.

When the line first opened, some people complained about noise problems. Thus, sound-muffling walls were built along the tracks coming into the station.

The line has a capacity of 4,140 passengers per hour.

== Stations ==
Code	Station name	Station type		Locale		Sta. distance (km)		Opened date	Transfer
Code	Station name	Structure	Platform	Locale		Previous	Total	Opened date	Transfer
Xiaobitan Branch Line
G03	Qizhang 七張	Underground	Side	Xindian	New Taipei	—N/a	0.00	1999-11-11	Songshan–Xindian Line
G03A	Xiaobitan 小碧潭	Elevated	Side	Xindian	New Taipei	1.94	1.94	2004–9–29	—N/a
