= Xindian District Office metro station =

Metro station in New Taipei, Taiwan

Xindian District Office 新店區公所
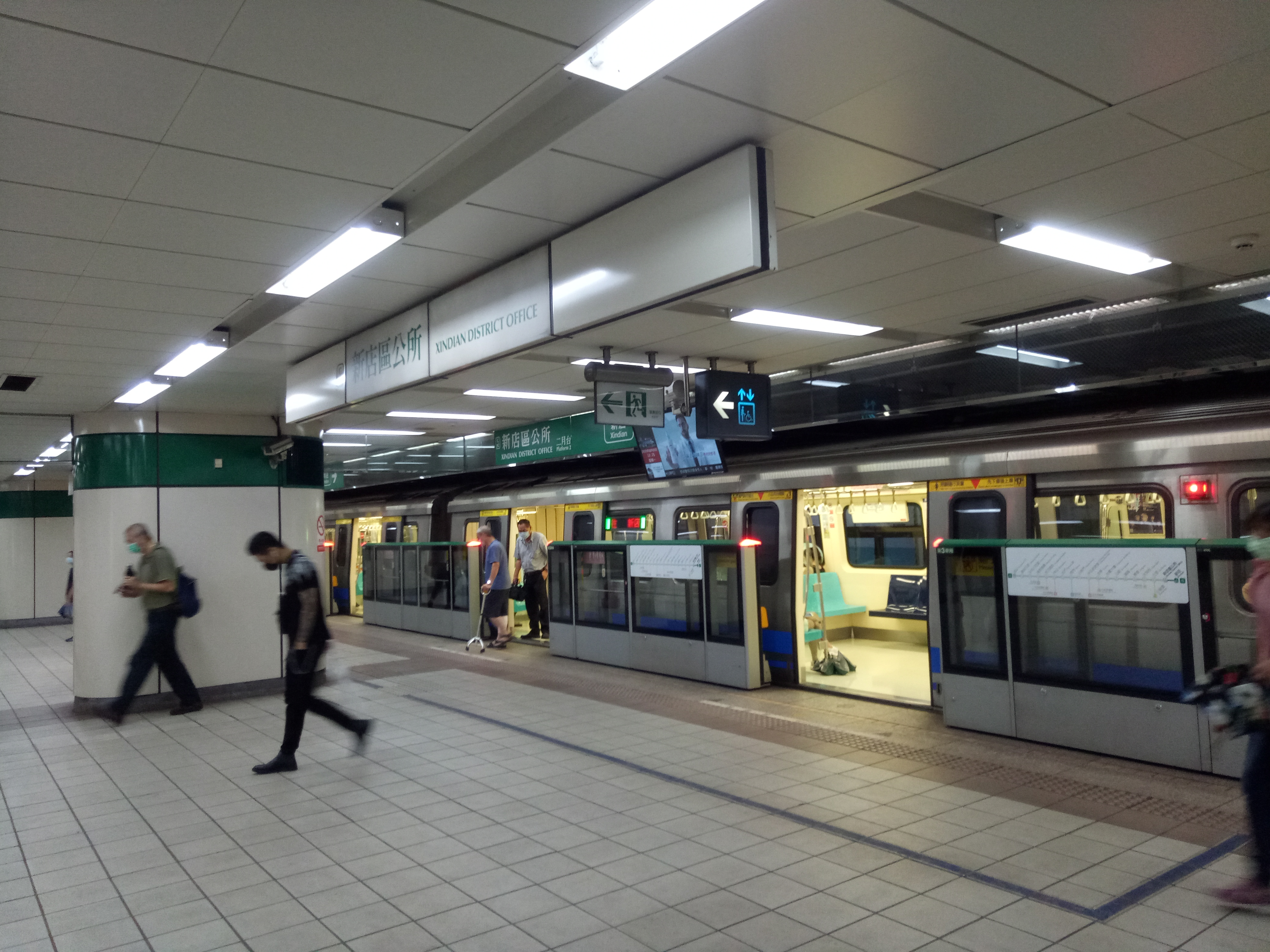
- Platform

Chinese name
- Traditional Chinese: 新店區公所
- Simplified Chinese: 新店区公所
Transcriptions
Standard Mandarin
- Hanyu Pinyin: Xīndiàn Qū Gōngsǔo
- Bopomofo: ㄒㄧㄣ ㄉㄧㄢˋㄑㄩ ㄍㄨㄥ ㄙㄨㄛˇ
- Wade–Giles: Hsin¹-tien⁴ Chü¹ Kung¹-suo³
Hakka
- Pha̍k-fa-sṳ: Sîn-tiam-kí-gúng-sò
Southern Min
- Tâi-lô: Sin-tiàm-khu-kong-só͘

General information
- Location: No. 295, Sec. 1, Beixin Rd; Xindian, New Taipei; Taiwan
- Coordinates: 24.967842°N 121.541429°E
- Operator: Taipei Metro
- Line: Songshan–Xindian line
- Platforms: 2 side platforms
- Connections: Bus stop

Construction
- Structure type: Underground

Other information
- Station code: G02

History
- Opened: 11 November 1999; 26 years ago
- Former names: Xindian City Hall; Xindian City Office

Passengers
- daily (December 2024)
- Rank: 78 out of 109 and 7 others

Services
Preceding station	Taipei Metro	Following station
Qizhang towards Songshan	Songshan–Xindian line	Xindian Terminus
Location

The Taipei Metro Xindian District Office station is a station on the Songshan–Xindian line located in Xindian District, New Taipei, Taiwan.

It was originally called Hsintien City Hall station from 1999 until 2003, Xindian City Hall station from 2003 until 2009 (Chinese: 新店市公所; pinyin: Xīndiàn Shì Gōngsuǒ), then renamed Xindian City Office (same name in Chinese: 新店市公所) station for the remainder of 2009, and eventually renamed to the current name of Xindian District Office (Chinese: 新店區公所; pinyin: Xīndiàn Qū Gōngsǔo) in 2010.

== Station overview ==
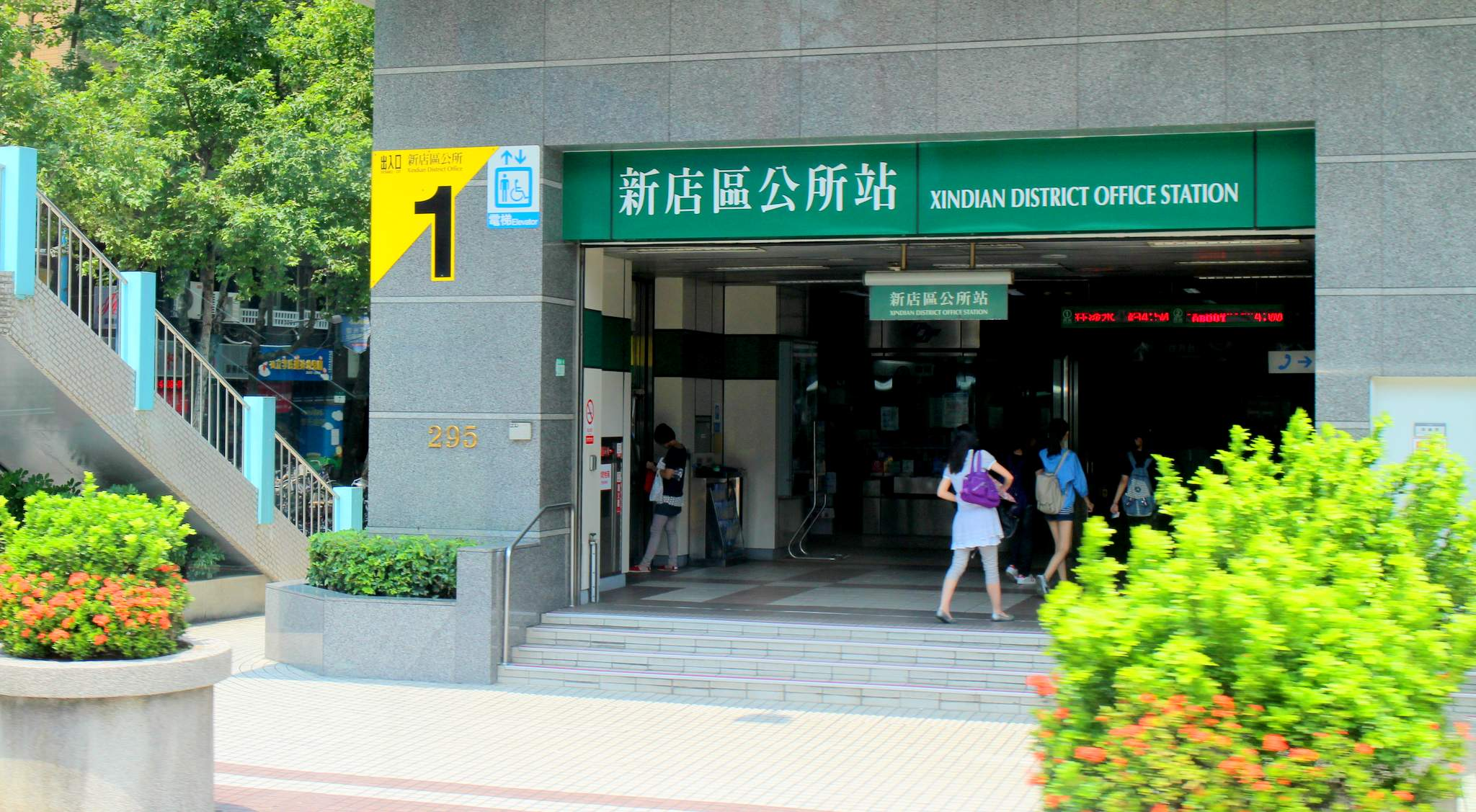
Xindian District Office station exit 1

This two-level, underground station has two side platforms and two exits.

== Station layout ==
Street level	Concourse	Entrance/exit, lobby, information desk, automatic ticket dispensing machines, one-way faregates Restrooms (west side, inside fare area)
B1
B1	Side platform, doors will open on the right
B1	Platform 1	← Songshan–Xindian Line toward Songshan (G03 Qizhang)
B1	Platform 2	→ Songshan–Xindian Line toward Xindian (G01 terminus) →
B1	Side platform, doors will open on the right

B2	Connecting level	Platform connecting level

=== Exits ===
- Exit 1: Beixin Rd. Sec. 1 and Zhonghua Rd. (Xindian District Office)
- Exit 2: Beixin Sec. 1 Lane 88 and Beixin Rd. Sec. 1

== Around the station ==
- Wufeng Junior High School
- Xindian Sports Center
- Liugong Park
