= Xinxian, Hebei =

Coordinates: 37°58′11″N 117°06′47″E

Xinxian
- Town

Chinese transcription(s)
  - Chinese: 新县镇
  - Pinyin: Xīnxiàn Zhèn
- Interactive map of Xinxian
- Country: China
- Province: Hebei
- Prefecture: Cangzhou
- Autonomous County: Mengcun Hui
- Time zone: UTC+8 (China Standard Time)

Xinxian (Chinese: 新县镇; pinyin: Xīnxiàn Zhèn) is a township-level division situated in Mengcun Hui Autonomous County, Cangzhou, Hebei, China.

== See also ==
- List of township-level divisions of Hebei
