= Xiaobitan metro station =

Metro station in New Taipei, Taiwan

Xiaobitan 小碧潭
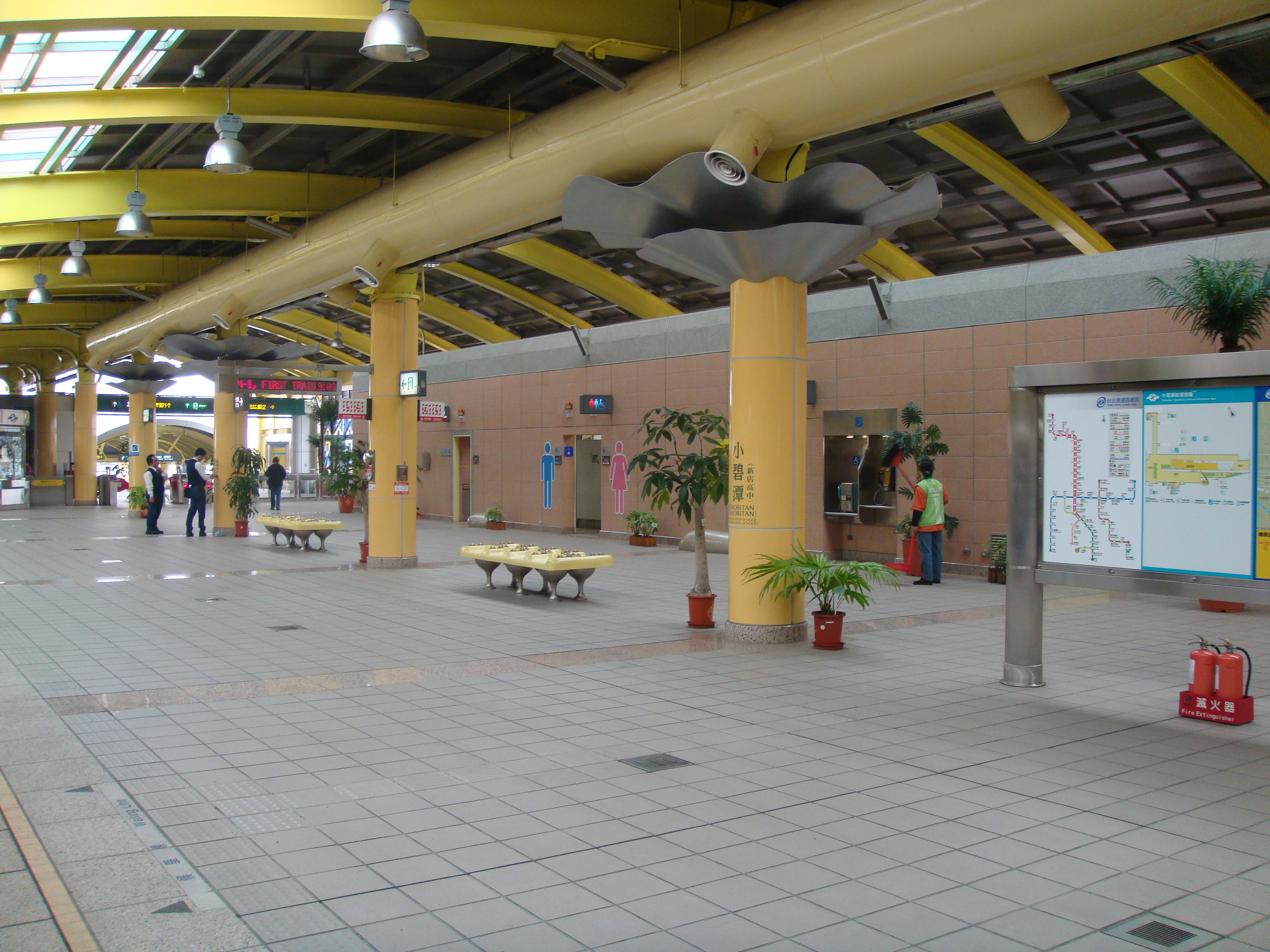
- Xiaobitan station

Chinese name
- Chinese: 小碧潭
Transcriptions
Standard Mandarin
- Hanyu Pinyin: Xiǎobìtán
- Bopomofo: ㄒㄧㄠˇ ㄅㄧˋ ㄊㄢˊ
- Wade–Giles: Hsiao³ Pi⁴-t'an²
Hakka
- Pha̍k-fa-sṳ: Séu-pit-thàm
Southern Min
- Tâi-lô: Sió-phik-thâm

General information
- Other names: Xindian Senior High School; 新店高中
- Location: 4F., No.151, Zhongyang Rd. Xindian, New Taipei; Taiwan
- Coordinates: 24.973065°N 121.529987°E
- Operator: Taipei Metro
- Lines: Songshan–Xindian Line ( Xiaobitan Branch Line)
- Platforms: 1 side platform
- Connections: Bus stop

Construction
- Structure type: Elevated

Other information
- Station code: G03A

History
- Opened: 29 September 2004; 22 years ago

Passengers
- daily (December 2024)
- Rank: 108 out of 109

Services
Preceding station	Taipei Metro	Following station
Qizhang Terminus	Xiaobitan Branch Line	Terminus
Location

The Taipei Metro Xiaobitan station is a terminal station on the Xiaobitan branch line located in Xindian District, New Taipei, Taiwan.

== Station overview ==
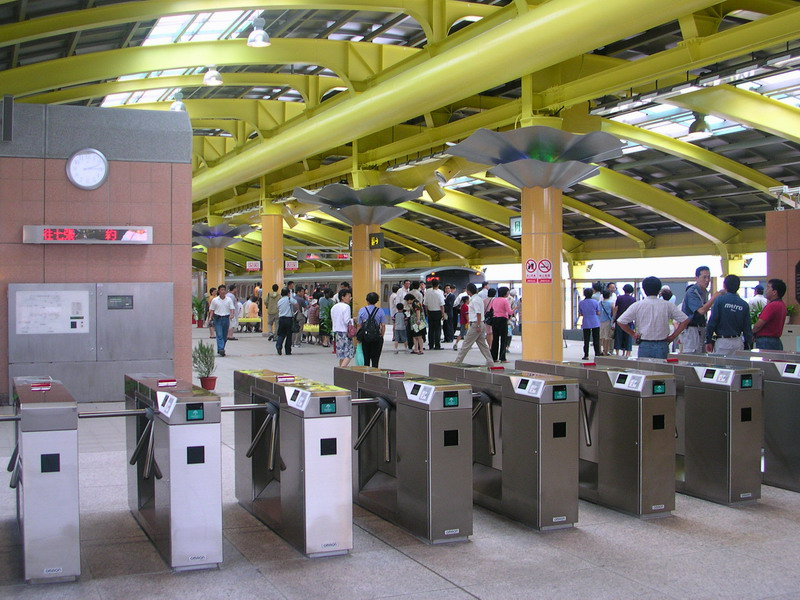
Inside Xiaobitan station

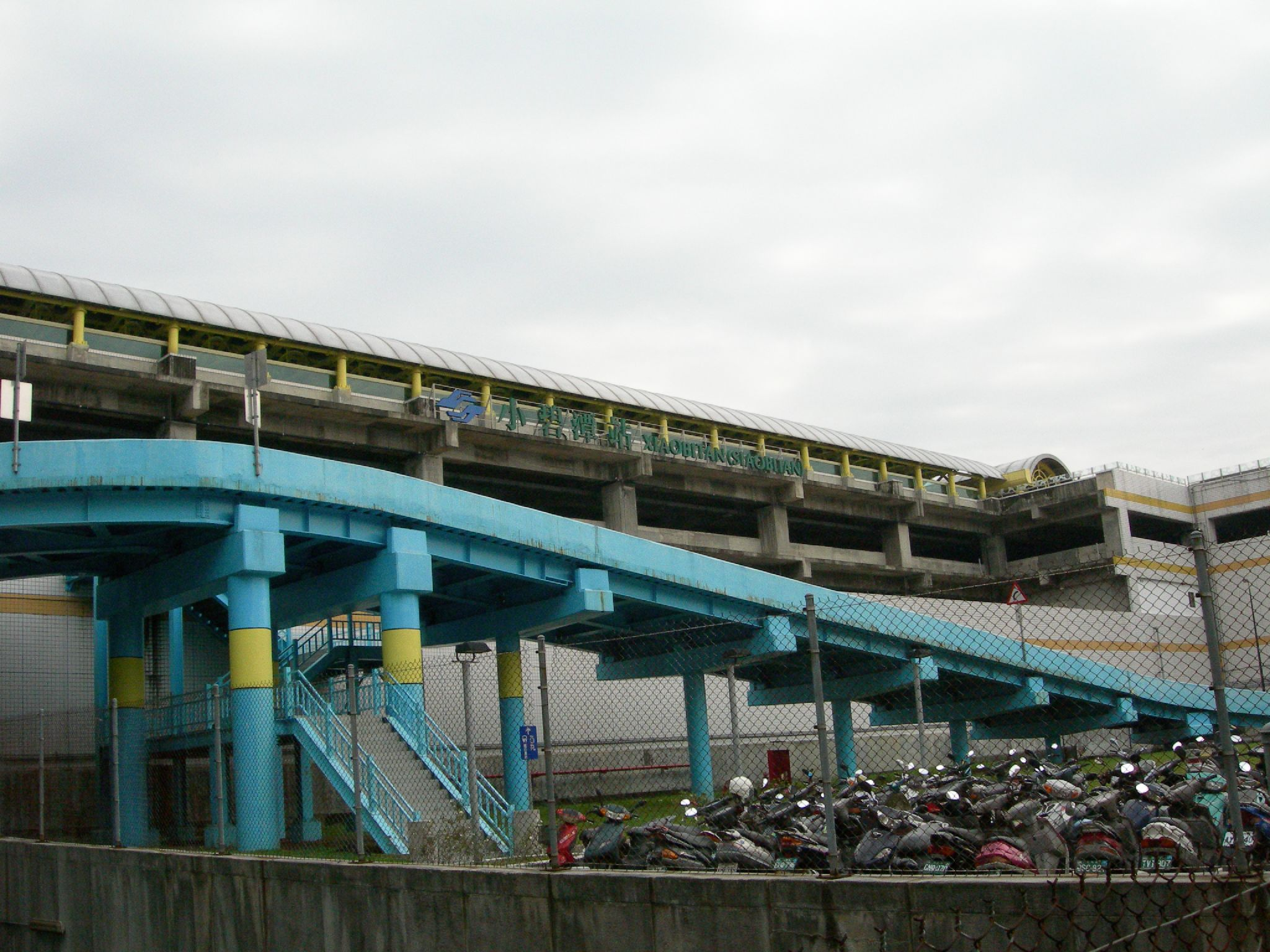
MRT Xiaobitan station

This is an elevated station with four levels, a side platform, and two exits. Its platform length allows for a three-car, high capacity train. The station is right next to the Xindian Depot, above the maintenance workshop and near Freeway 3.

The entrance to the station and platform are situated on the fourth floor of the depot. The station covers an area of 3,000 square meters (32,292 sq ft), while the platform is 70.5 meters (231 ft 4 in) long. Two escalators are located at the two entrances and are 14.45 meters (47 ft 5 in) high and 16.52 meters (54 ft 2 in) high; they are the second longest escalators in the system after those at Zhongxiao Fuxing.

=== Public art ===
Public art at the station is themed "The Way to the Very Joyance", where the station design includes many elements designed to embrace nature. Pieces include "Time Jelly", a bronze piece shaped like melting toffee over a station wall, and "The Dancing Cloud", a plastic and steel piece situated on top of platform columns. Additional pieces include those in adjacent public squares around the station.

== History ==
Construction began on 2 April 2001, and after four years was completed on 30 September 2004. When the line first opened, some people complained about noise problems. Thus, sound-muffling walls were built along the tracks coming into the station.

Although the station platform only allows room for a three-car trainset, when the station was first opened, a six-car trainset was used on the line. In this case, only the first three train cars' doors opened at this station (selective door operation). It was not until 22 July 2006 that a dedicated three-car trainset began service on the line.

== Station layout ==
4F	Platform 1	← Xiaobitan branch line toward Qizhang (G03 Terminus)
4F	Side platform, doors will open on the right
4F	Concourse	Market, lobby, information counter, automatic ticket machines, one-way faregates Restrooms (inside fare zone)
3F	Parking lot	Elevator, escalator connecting platform
2F	Parking lot	Elevator, escalator connecting platform
Street level	Entrance/exit, lobby	Entrance/exit, market, Xindian Depot; Lobby, information counter, restrooms (inside fare zone)

== Xindian Depot ==
The Xindian Line Depot is part of this station. A joint development project to construct an artificial ground area for commercial, residential, and office buildings is under construction. The completion of the project would reduce noise pollution from passing trains and would allow for recreation, entertainment, and work through mixed-use architecture.

== Around the station ==
- Xiaobitan Park
- Sunshine Sports Park
- IKEA Xindian

== Gallery ==
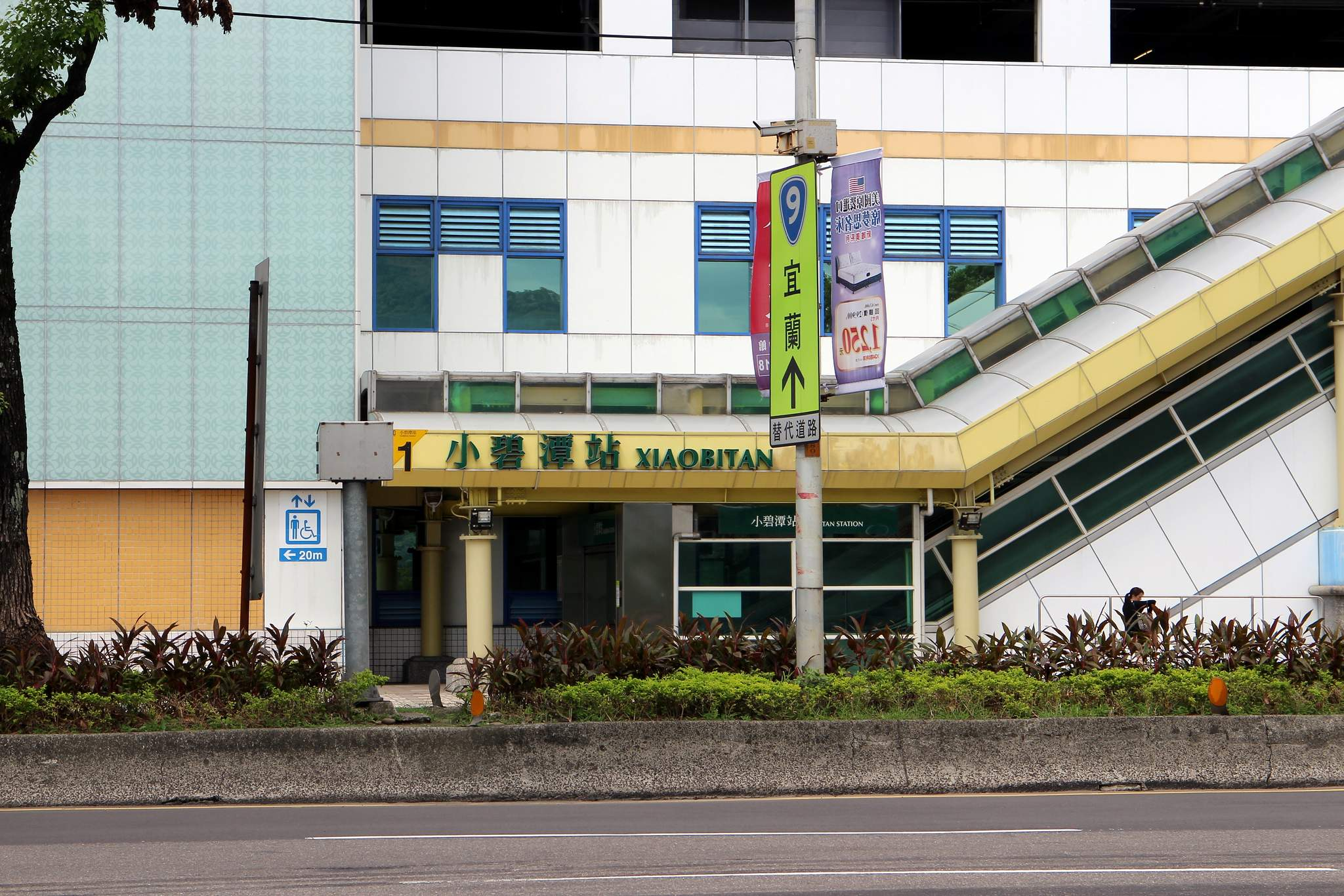
Xiaobitan station exit 1

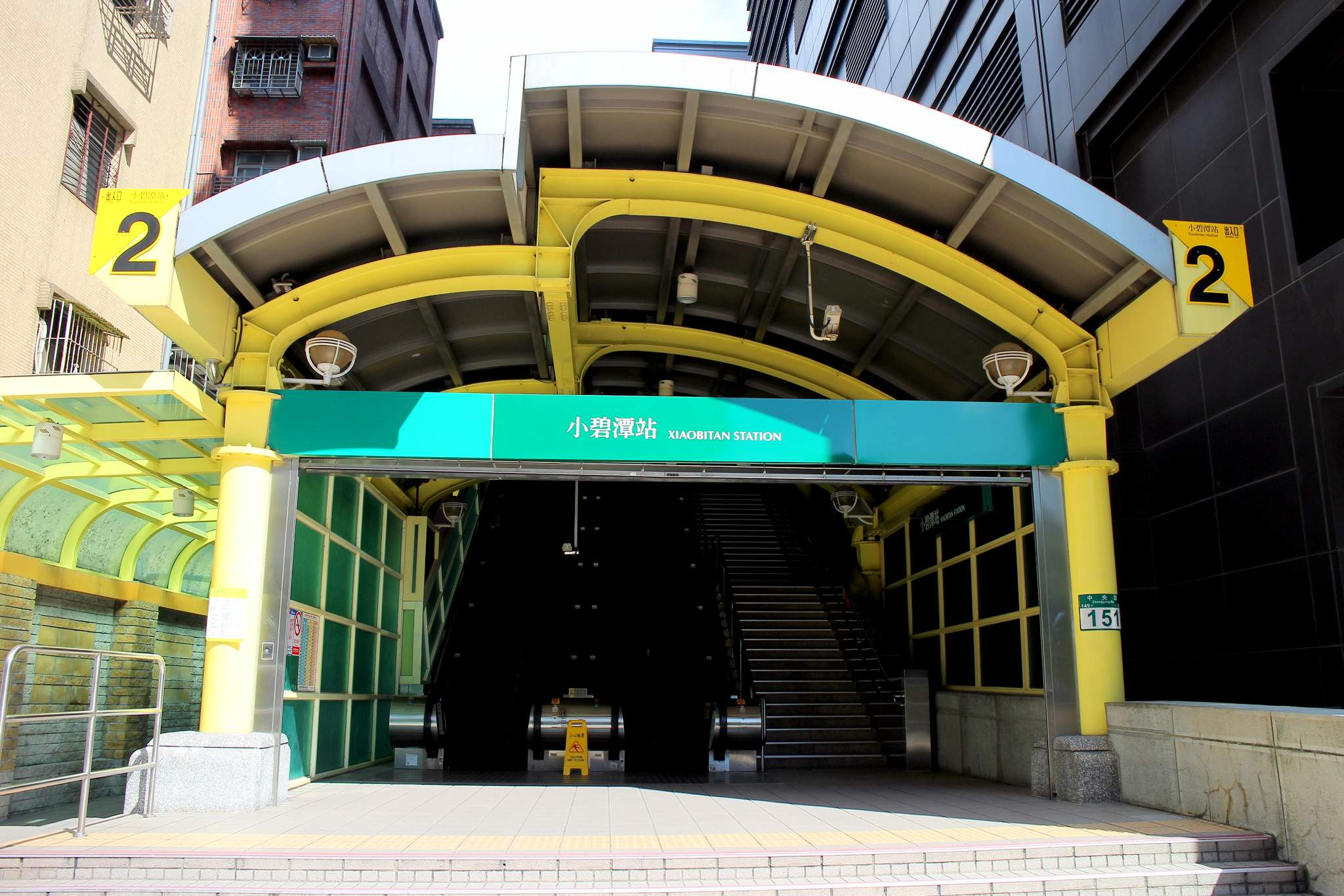
Xiaobitan station exit 2
