= Xindian, Ren County =

Coordinates: 37°08′03″N 114°53′00″E

Xindian 辛店镇
- Town
- Interactive map of Xindian
- Country: China
- Province: Hebei
- Prefecture: Xingtai
- County: Ren County
- Time zone: UTC+8 (China Standard Time)

Xindian (Chinese: 辛店镇; pinyin: Xīndiàn Zhèn) is a township-level division situated in Ren County, Xingtai, Hebei, China.

== See also ==
- List of township-level divisions of Hebei
