= Songshan–Xindian Line =

Metro line in Taipei, Taiwan

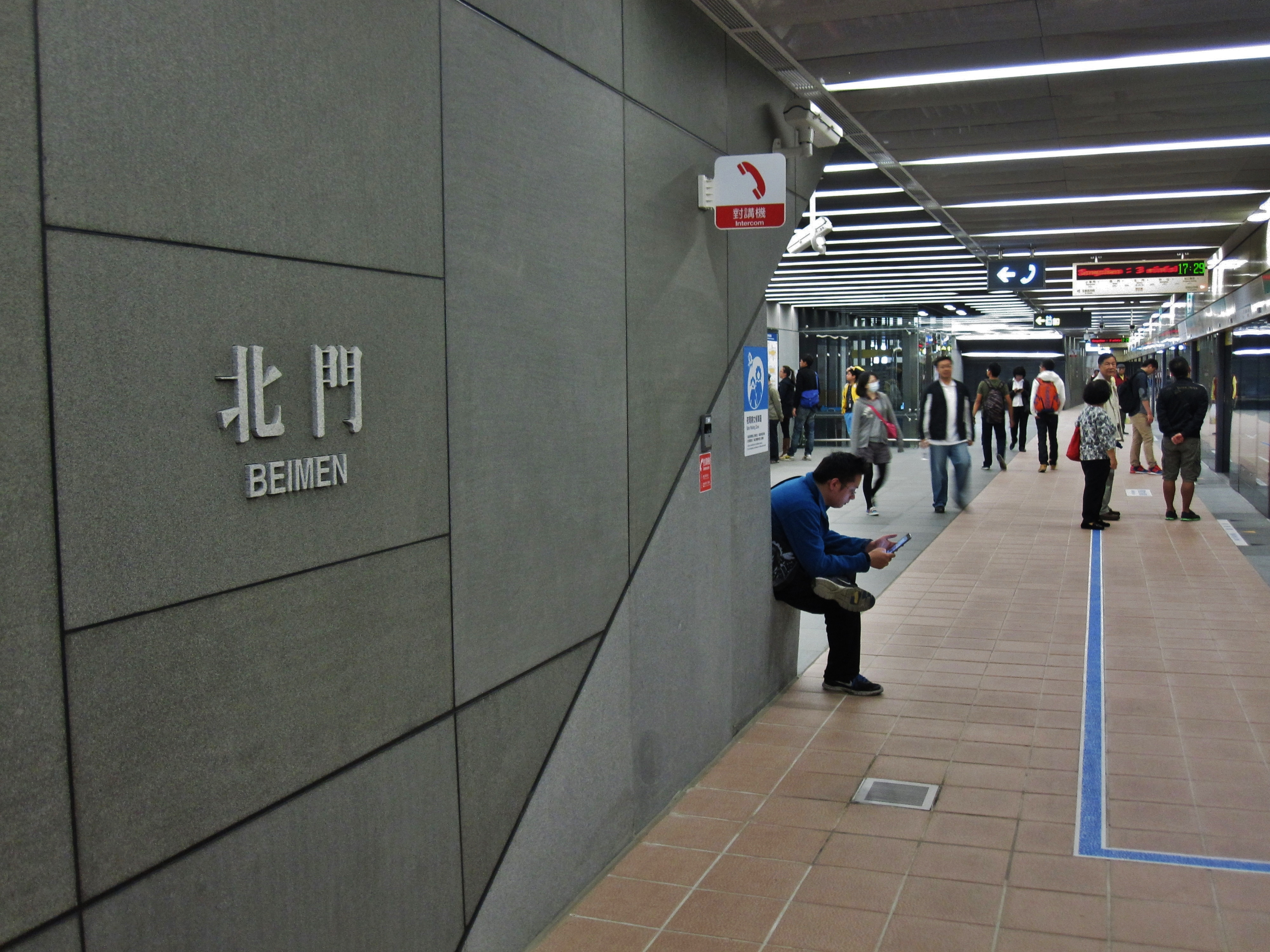
- Beimen station platform

Overview
- Other name: Green Line
- Native name: 松山新店線
- Status: In service
- Owner: Taipei DORTS
- Line number: G
- Locale: Taipei and New Taipei, Taiwan
- Termini: Songshan; Xindian
- Stations: 20
- Color on map: Green

Service
- Type: Rapid transit
- System: Taipei Metro
- Services: Songshan–Xindian (full); Songshan–Taipower Building (short-turn); Qizhang–Xiaobitan (branch)
- Operator: Taipei Rapid Transit Corporation
- Depot: Xindian
- Rolling stock: C371 (6-car); C381

History
- Opened: 24 December 1998; 27 years ago
- Last extension: 2014

Technical
- Line length: 21.5 km (13.4 mi)
- Num of tracks: 2
- Character: Underground
- Track gauge: 1,435 mm (4 ft 8 1/2 in) standard gauge
- Electrification: 750 V DC third rail
- Operating speed: 80 km/h (50 mph)

Songshan–Xindian Line
- Traditional Chinese: 松山新店線
- Simplified Chinese: 松山新店线
Transcriptions
Standard Mandarin
- Hanyu Pinyin: Sōngshān-Xīndiàn Xiàn
Hakka
- Pha̍k-fa-sṳ: Chhiùng-sân–Sîn-tiam Sien
Southern Min
- Hokkien POJ: Siông-san-Sin-tiàm Soàⁿ

Green Line
- Traditional Chinese: 綠線
- Simplified Chinese: 绿线
Transcriptions
Standard Mandarin
- Hanyu Pinyin: Lǜ Xiàn
Hakka
- Pha̍k-fa-sṳ: Liu̍k Sien
Southern Min
- Hokkien POJ: Le̍k-soàⁿ

The Songshan–Xindian Line (Chinese: 松山新店線), also known as Green Line (Chinese: 綠線), is a metro line in Taipei operated by Taipei Metro, named after the districts it connects: Songshan and Xindian. Parts of the line runs under the Roosevelt Road, following the route of the former Xindian (Hsintien) railway line, which ceased service in 1965 on its southern section.

== History ==
- January 1991: Construction began on the Xindian line.
- 21 November 1997: The Songshan-Ximen section was approved by the Executive Yuan.
- 24 December 1998: The segment between Chiang Kai-shek Memorial Hall and Guting opened for service.
- 11 November 1999: The rest of the line opened for service, and trains ran through Tamsui Line to Tamsui.
- 31 August 2000: The segment between Chiang Kai-shek Memorial Hall and Ximen opened for service (as the Xiaonanmen Line).
- 29 September 2004: The Xiaobitan Branch Line opened for service.
- 19 August 2006: Construction began on the Songshan-Ximen section.
- December 2008: During underground excavation along Nanjing East Road, Section 3, underground support (anchors) for several nearby buildings were discovered. Structural concerns resulted in a temporary suspension of excavation and construction.
- 14 January 2009: The city government announced that the building anchors would not affect the opening of the Songshan-Ximen section.
- 15 November 2014: With the opening of Songshan section, trains ran between Songshan and Xindian stations, forming the current Songshan–Xindian Line. Tamsui-Xindian services ended and the Xiaonanmen line merged with the current Songshan–Xindian Line.

=== Tianshui Road station ===
Initial plans for the line originally called for another station between Zhongshan and Beimen stations (at Chien-Cheng Circle). However, the Circle was suffering from economic concerns, as well as engineering feasibility and effectiveness problems. Coupled with problems with landowners regarding joint developments and two of the entrances/exits, plans for the station were shelved on 1 May 2007. This would have been a five-level underground station with stacked, split platforms.

=== Construction of Songshan section ===
It was originally estimated that its opening would take place in 2013.

Shield tunneling was used to construct most of the tunnels on the line, except for a few locations. Tunneling beneath Dacheng St. crosses existing Taiwan Railway Administration and Taiwan High Speed Rail tunnels. Common utility ducts were constructed in sync with the Metro line, carrying water pipes, gas pipes, and cables. Over 200 homes were demolished or relocated to make way for Metro land use.

Construction of the line was divided into three civil engineering section contracts and one electrical/mechanical system-wide contract. The contract for construction on the eastern end of the line (including Nanjing Sanmin and Songshan) was awarded to Da Cin Construction Co., Ltd. on 2 March 2006. The 3.02 km (1.88 mi)-long section includes a crossover section, a tail-track work shaft, and three shield tunnels. Construction of the line was completed in late 2014.

In 2008, steel price increases threatened to delay construction plans due to the price doubling over the previous two years. The Ministry of Economic Affairs ordered that exports of other steel products be strictly supervised to ensure a steady local supply and to keep prices down.

The Old Taipei Railway Workshop, a 3rd level historical monument constructed during the era of Japanese rule, was exactly where the proposed Beimen station would be located. Thus, a temporary removal project commenced on 20 October 2006 to move the structure until construction of both the Songshan Line and the Taoyuan International Airport MRT are completed. The building moved 30 meters to the southeast, and moved back when construction is completed.

== Services ==
As of December 2017, the typical off-peak service is:

- 11 trains per hour (tph) between Xindian and Songshan
- 3 tph between Taipower Building and Songshan

== Soundscape ==
Chopin's Nocturne in E-flat major, Op. 9, No. 2 is played at metro platforms every time a train arrives on the Songshan–Xindian Line.

== Stations ==
Code	Station name	Station type		Locale		Sta. distance (km)		Opened date	Transfer
Code	Station name	Structure	Platform	Locale		Previous	Total	Opened date	Transfer
Songshan–Xindian Line
G01	Xindian 新店	Underground	Island	Xindian	New Taipei	—N/a	0.00	1999-11-11	—N/a
G02	Xindian District Office 新店區公所	Underground	Side	Xindian	New Taipei	1.11	1.11	1999-11-11	—N/a
G03	Qizhang 七張	Underground	Side	Xindian	New Taipei	0.90	2.01	1999-11-11	Xiaobitan Branch Line
G04	Dapinglin 大坪林	Underground	Island	Xindian	New Taipei	0.85	2.86	1999-11-11	Circular Line
G05	Jingmei 景美	Underground	Island	Wenshan	Taipei	1.15	4.01	1999-11-11	—N/a
G06	Wanlong 萬隆	Underground	Island	Wenshan	Taipei	1.06	5.07	1999-11-11	—N/a
G07	Gongguan 公館	Underground	Island	Zhongzheng	Taipei	1.56	6.63	1999-11-11	—N/a
G08	Taipower Building 台電大樓	Underground	Island	Zhongzheng	Taipei	0.90	7.53	1999-11-11	—N/a
G09	Guting 古亭	Underground	Island/split	Zhongzheng	Taipei	0.88	8.41	1998-12-24	Zhonghe–Xinlu Line
G10	Chiang Kai-shek Memorial Hall 中正紀念堂	Underground	Island/split	Zhongzheng	Taipei	0.93	9.34	1998-12-24	Tamsui–Xinyi Line; Wanda–Shulin Line
G11	Xiaonanmen 小南門	Underground	Island	Zhongzheng	Taipei	0.76	10.10	2000-8-31	—N/a
G12	Ximen 西門	Underground	Island/split	Zhongzheng	Taipei	0.82	10.92	1999-12-24	Bannan Line
G13	Beimen 北門	Underground	Side	Datong	Taipei	0.81	11.73	2014-11-15	Taoyuan Airport MRT (A1)
G14	Zhongshan 中山	Underground	Island	Datong	Taipei	1.26	12.99	2014-11-15	Tamsui–Xinyi Line
G15	Songjiang Nanjing 松江南京	Underground	Side	Zhongshan	Taipei	1.30	14.29	2014-11-15	Zhonghe–Xinlu Line
G16	Nanjing Fuxing 南京復興	Underground	Island	Songshan	Taipei	0.99	15.28	2014-11-15	Wenhu Line
G17	Taipei Arena 台北小巨蛋	Underground	Island	Songshan	Taipei	0.94	16.22	2014-11-15	—N/a
G18	Nanjing Sanmin 南京三民	Underground	Island	Songshan	Taipei	1.20	17.42	2014-11-15	—N/a
G19	Songshan 松山	Underground	Island	Songshan	Taipei	1.35	18.77	2014-11-15	Circular Line; Western Trunk line
Xiaobitan Branch Line
G03	Qizhang 七張	Underground	Side	Xindian	New Taipei	—N/a	0.00	1999-11-11	Songshan–Xindian Line
G03A	Xiaobitan 小碧潭	Elevated	Side	Xindian	New Taipei	1.94	1.94	2004-9-29	—N/a

== See also ==
- Xiaobitan Branch Line
