= Xindian metro station =

Metro station in New Taipei, Taiwan

Xindian 新店
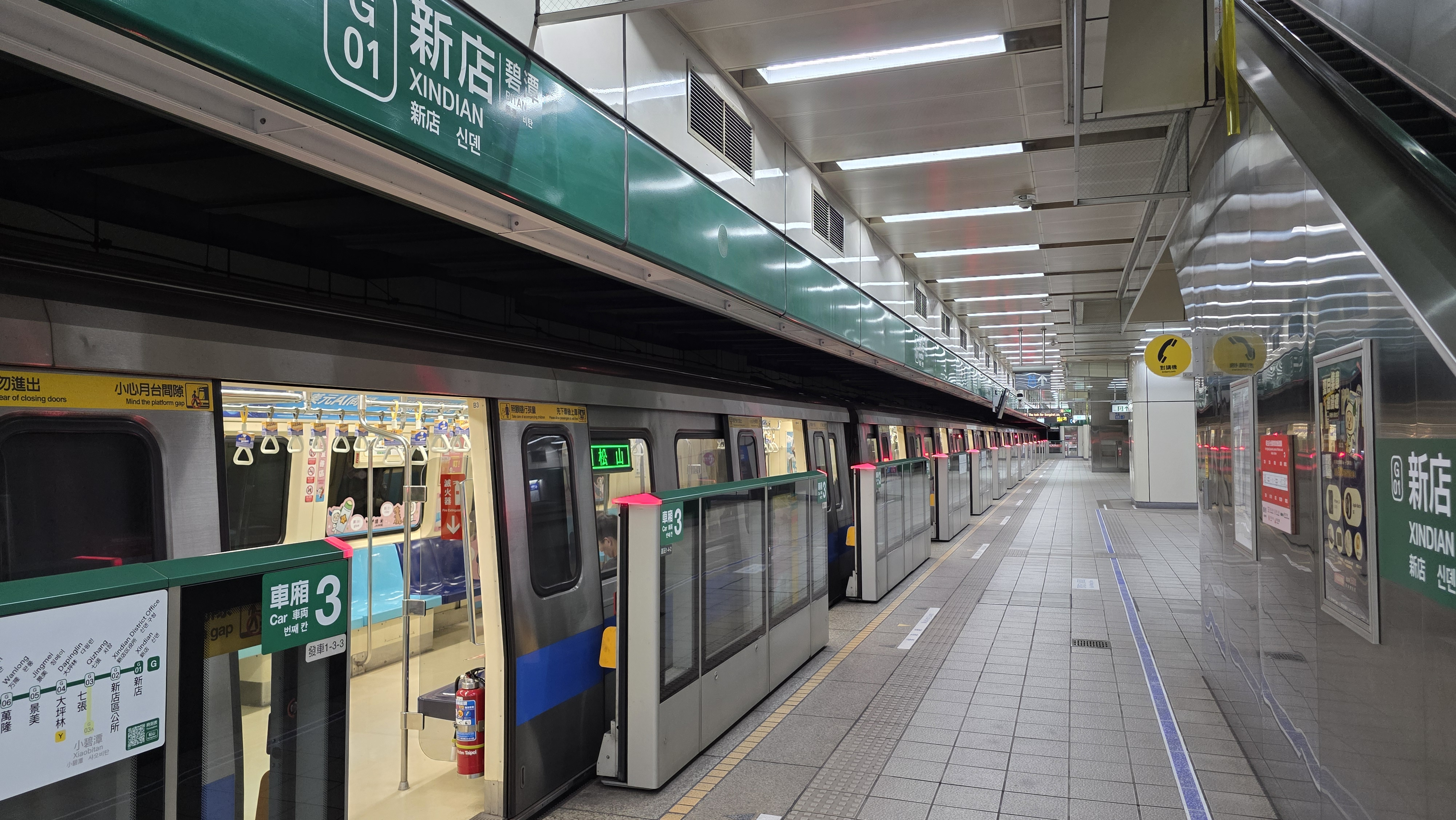
- Platform 1 of Xindian metro station

Chinese name
- Chinese: 新店
- Literal meaning: New store
Transcriptions
Standard Mandarin
- Hanyu Pinyin: Xīndiàn
- Bopomofo: ㄒㄧㄣ ㄉㄧㄢˋ
- Wade–Giles: Hsin^{1}-tien^{4}
Hakka
- Pha̍k-fa-sṳ: Sîn-tiam
Southern Min
- Tâi-lô: Sin-tiàm

General information
- Other names: Bitan (碧潭)
- Location: No.2, Sec. 1, Beiyi Rd. Xindian, New Taipei; Taiwan
- Coordinates: 24.95797°N 121.537711°E
- Operator: Taipei Metro
- Line: Songshan–Xindian line
- Connections: Bus stop

Construction
- Structure type: Underground

Other information
- Station code: G01

History
- Opened: 11 November 1999; 26 years ago
- Former names: Hsintien (until 2003)

Passengers
- daily (December 2024)
- Rank: 78 out of 109 and 7 others

Services
Preceding station	Taipei Metro	Following station
Xindian District Office towards Songshan	Songshan–Xindian line	Terminus
Location

The Taipei Metro Xindian station (formerly transliterated as Hsintien Station until 2003) is the southern terminus of the Songshan–Xindian line located in Xindian District, New Taipei, Taiwan.

== Station overview ==
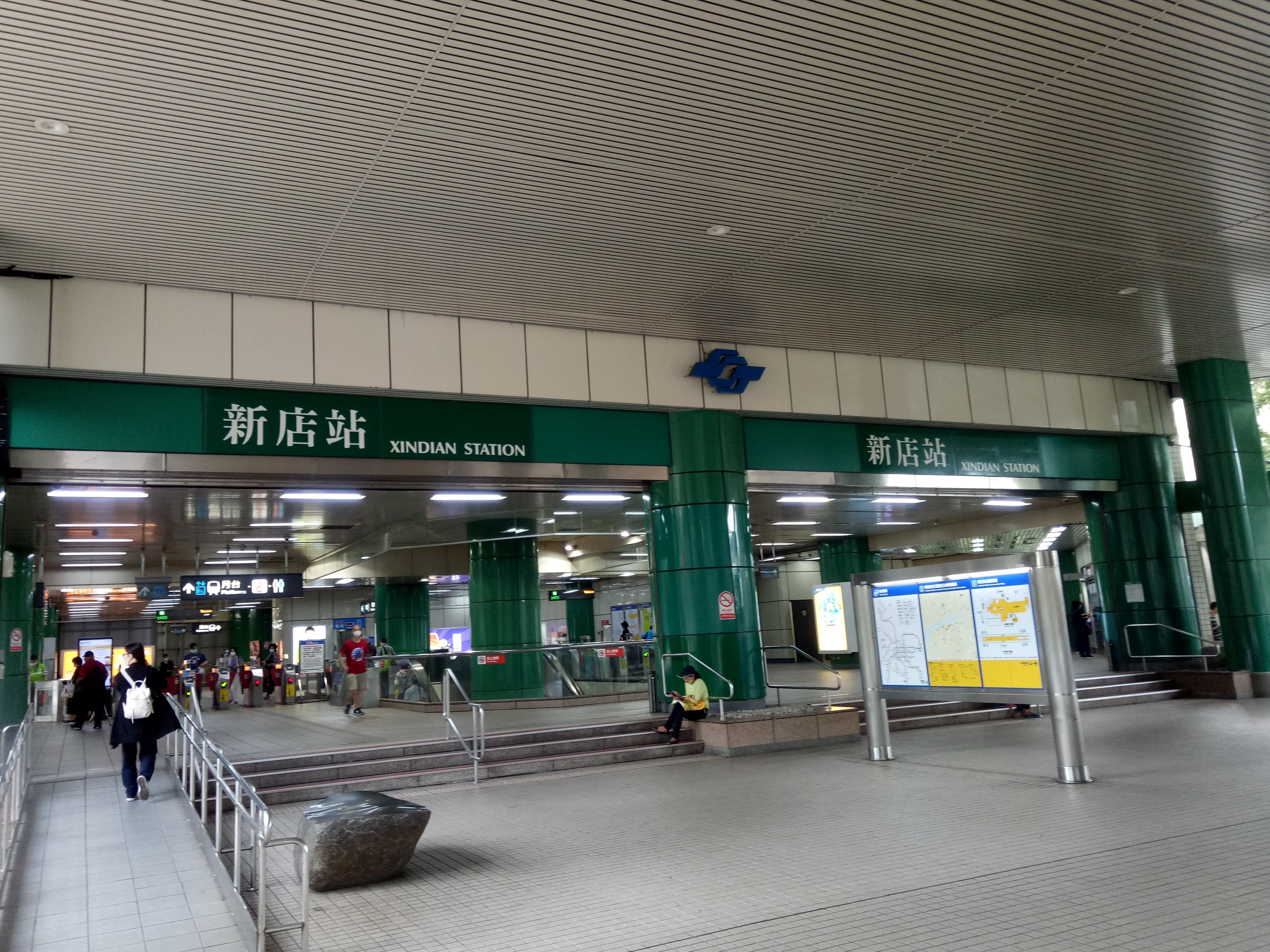
Xindian station exit

This one-level, underground station has an island platform and one exit. It was the southernmost station of the Taipei MRT until Dingpu station was completed.

== Public Art ==
Art for the station is titled "Heaven, Earth, and Man" and features many sculptures around the entrances. Designed by Takashi Tanabe, it was selected through open competition and cost NT$6,700,000.

== Station layout ==
Street level	Concourse	Entrance/exit, lobby, information desk, automatic ticket dispensing machines, one-way faregates Restrooms (south side, inside fare area)
B1
B1	Platform 1	← Songshan–Xindian line toward Songshan (G02 Xindian District Office)
B1	Island platform, doors will open on the left/ right
B1	Platform 2	← Songshan–Xindian line toward Songshan (G02 Xindian District Office)
