= Nova Group =

Nova Group may refer to:

- Nova (eikaiwa) - a private English teaching company in Japan
- Nova Group (metro) - a group of small to medium-sized metros
