= Taipei Metro =

Metro system in Taiwan

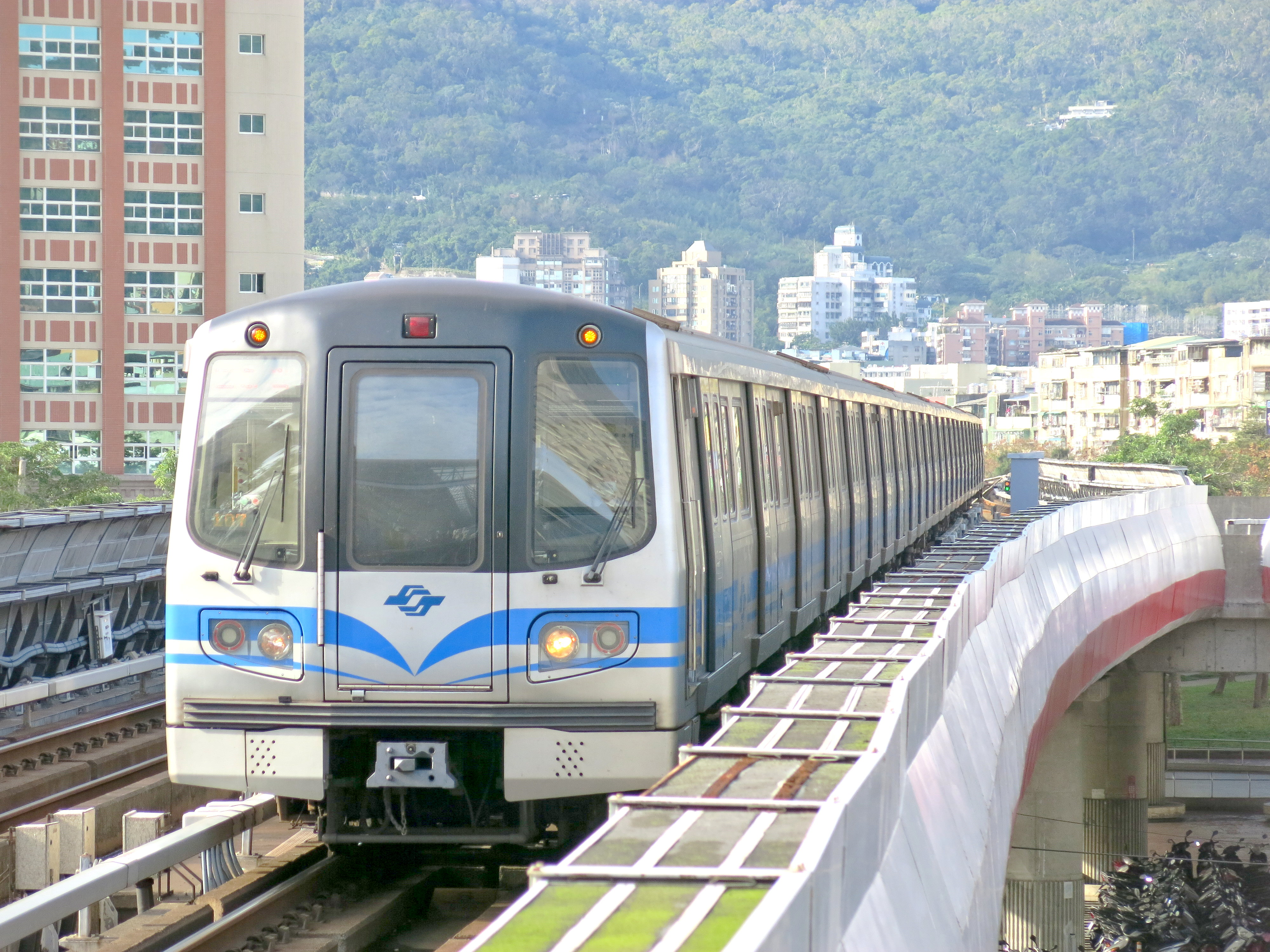

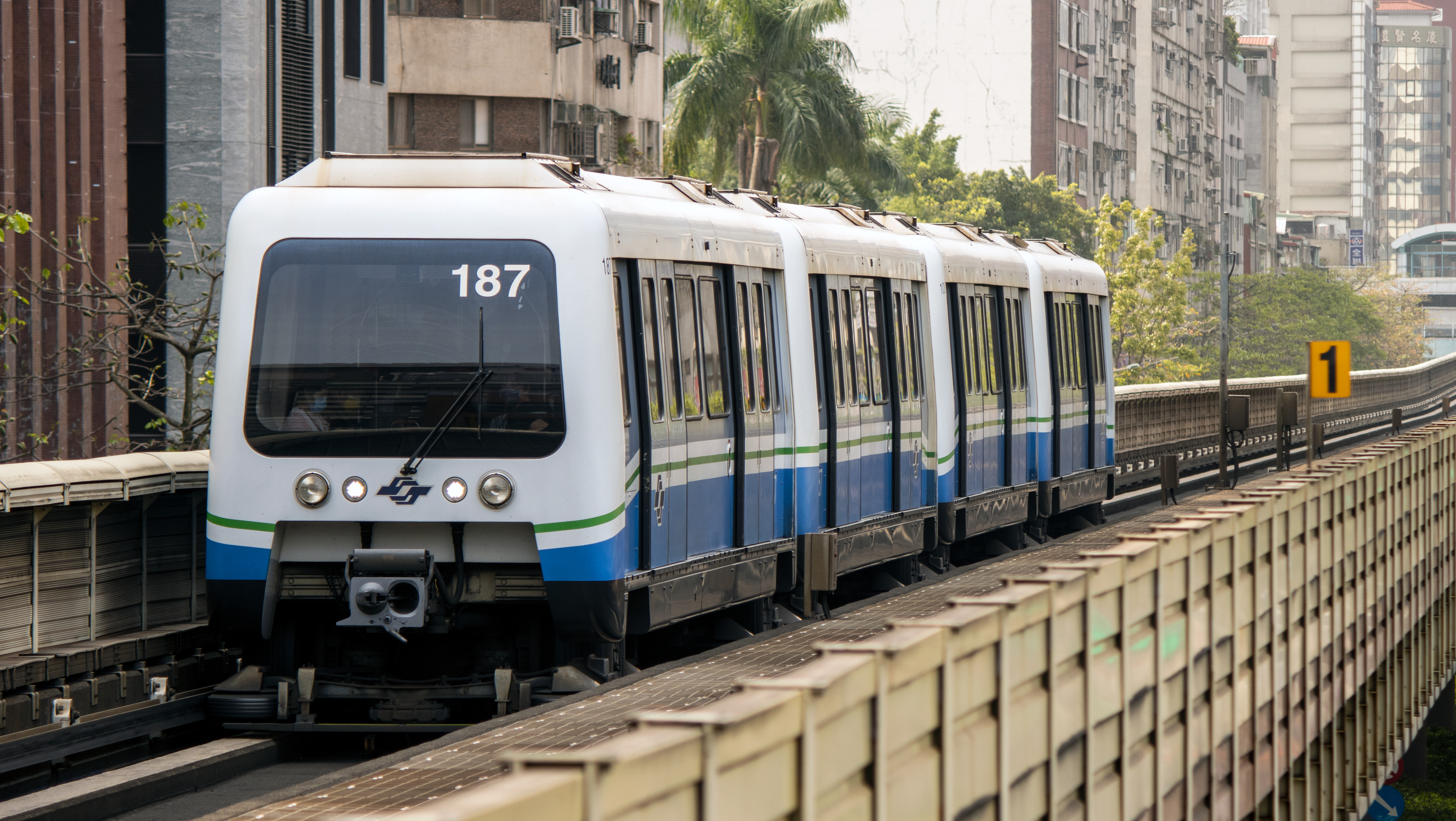
- Top: High-capacity Taipei Metro C381; Bottom: Medium-capacity Taipei Metro C370

Overview
- Native name: 臺北捷運 (Note: In local languages: Traditional Chinese script: 臺北捷運; Mandarin Pinyin: Táiběi jiéyùn; Hokkien: Tâi-pak chia̍t-ūn; Sixian Hakka: Thòi-pet chia̍p-yun); 臺北都會區大眾捷運系統
- Owner: Taipei City Government
- Area served: Taipei, New Taipei
- Locale: Taipei metropolitan area, Taiwan
- Transit type: Rapid transit Rubber-tyred metro (Wenhu Line)
- Number of lines: 5 (Note: Not including the Circular Line, operated by New Taipei Metro Corporation, nor branch lines.)
- Number of stations: 118 (Note: Excluding New Taipei Metro Corp's Circular Line. The cross-platform interchange stations are counted as a single stations.)
- Daily ridership: 2,101,700 (2025)
- Annual ridership: 767,120,668 (2025) ▲3.69%
- Chief executive: BC Yen
- Headquarters: 7 Lane 48 Sec 2 Zhongshan N Rd, Zhongshan District, Taipei
- Website: english.metro.taipei

Operation
- Began operation: 28 March 1996; 30 years ago
- Operator: Taipei Rapid Transit Corporation
- Character: Grade-separated
- Number of vehicles: 1,153 cars (217.5 trains (Note: Medium-capacity trains consist of 4 carriages, while heavy-capacity trains consist of 3 or 6; excluding Circular Line.))
- Train length: 3–6 carriages (Note: Wenhu Line: 4; Xiaobitan and Xinbeitou branches: 3)
- Headway: 2-9 minutes (Note: Wenhu Line; Peak average 2:01; Off-peak average 4:12; Other lines; Peak average 4:04; Off-peak average 6:08)

Technical
- System length: 138.3 km (85.9 mi)
- No. of tracks: 2
- Track gauge: 1,435 mm (4 ft 8 1/2 in) standard gauge (Note: Wenhu Line: 1,880 mm (6 ft 2 in) broad gauge)
- Minimum radius of curvature: 200 metres (656 ft) (Note: Wenhu Line: 33 metres (108 ft))
- Electrification: 750 V DC third rail
- Average speed: 31.50 kilometres per hour (20 mph) (Note: Wenhu Line: 32.84 kilometres per hour (20 mph))
- Top speed: 80 kilometres per hour (50 mph) (Note: Wenhu Line: 70 kilometres per hour (43 mph))

Taipei Metro
- Traditional Chinese: 臺北捷運
- Simplified Chinese: 台北捷运
Transcriptions
Standard Mandarin
- Hanyu Pinyin: Táiběi Jiéyùn
- Bopomofo: ㄊㄞˊ ㄅㄟˇ ㄐ一ㄝˊ ㄩㄣˋ
- Wade–Giles: T'ai^{2}-pei^{3} Chieh^{2}-yün^{4}
- Tongyong Pinyin: Táiběi Jiéyùn
Hakka
- Romanization: Thòi-pet Chia̍p-yun
Southern Min
- Tâi-lô: Tâi-pak Tsia̍t-ūn

Taipei Rapid Transit System
- Traditional Chinese: 臺北大眾捷運系統
- Simplified Chinese: 台北大众捷运系统
Transcriptions
Standard Mandarin
- Hanyu Pinyin: Táiběi Dàzhòng Jiéyùn Xìtǒng
- Bopomofo: ㄊㄞˊ ㄅㄟˇ ㄉㄚˋ ㄓㄨㄥˋ ㄐ一ㄝˊ ㄩㄣˋ ㄒ一ˋ ㄊㄨㄥˇ
- Wade–Giles: T'ai^{2}-pei^{3} Ta^{4}-chung^{4} Chieh^{2}-yün^{4} Hsi^{4}-t'ung^{3}
Hakka
- Romanization: Thòi-pet Thai-zung Chia̍p-yun He-thúng
Southern Min
- Tâi-lô: Tâi-pak Tāi-tsiòng Tsia̍t-ūn Hē-thóng

The Taipei Metro (Chinese: 臺北捷運), officially the Taipei Mass Rapid Transit (MRT; Chinese: 臺北都會區大眾捷運系統), is a rapid transit system operated by the Taipei Rapid Transit Corporation serving the capital Taipei and New Taipei City in Taiwan.

It was the first rapid transit system to be built on the island. The initial network was approved for construction in 1986, and work began two years later. It began operations on 28 March 1996, and by 2000, 62 stations were in service across three main lines.

Over the next nine years, the number of passengers had increased by 70%. Since 2008, the network has expanded to 131 stations and the passenger count has grown by another 96%. The system has been praised by locals for its effectiveness in relieving growing traffic congestion in Taipei and its surrounding satellite towns, with over two million trips made daily.

== History ==
=== Proposal and construction ===
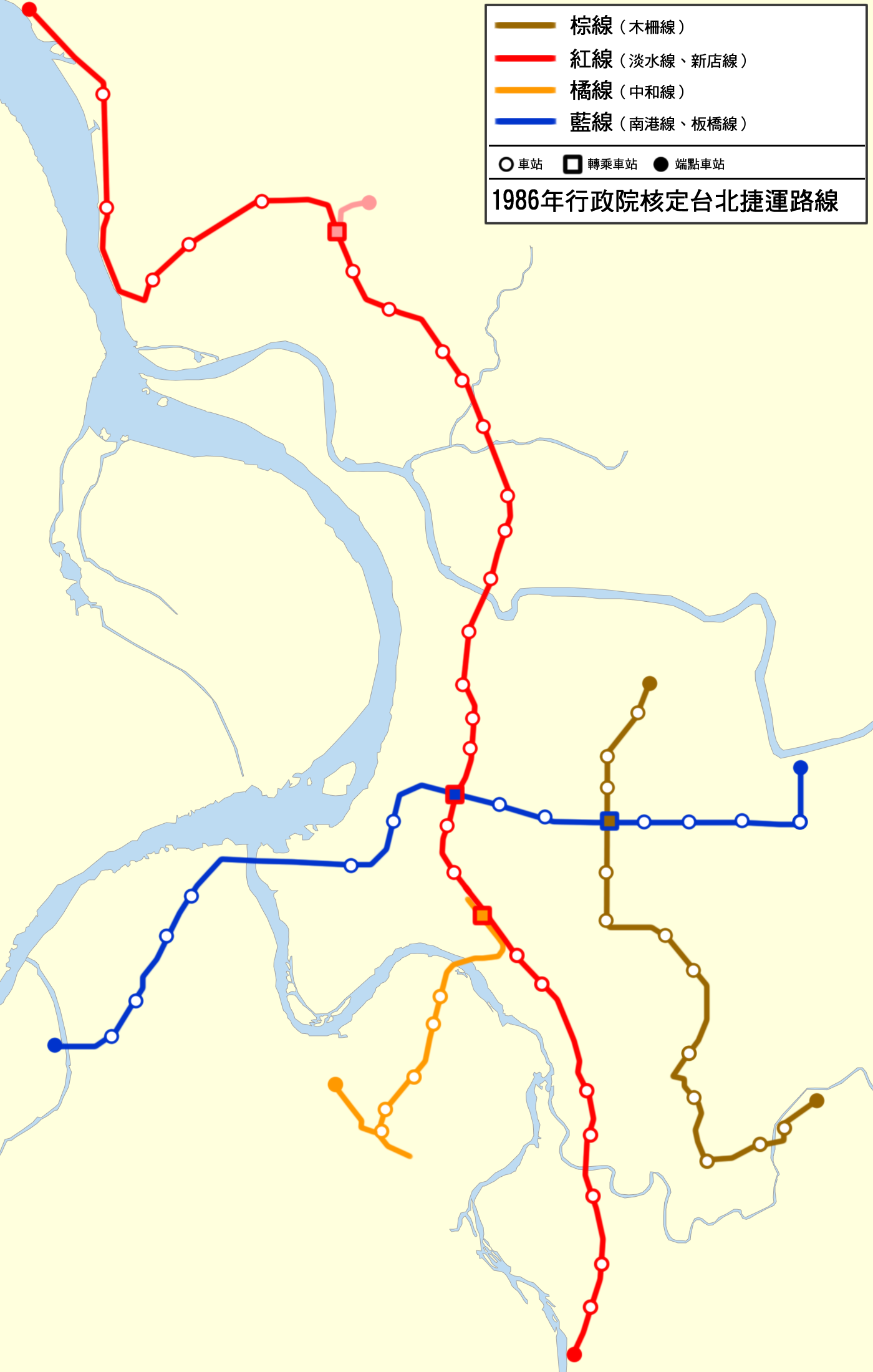
The initial Taipei Metro plan as approved by the Executive Yuan in 1986

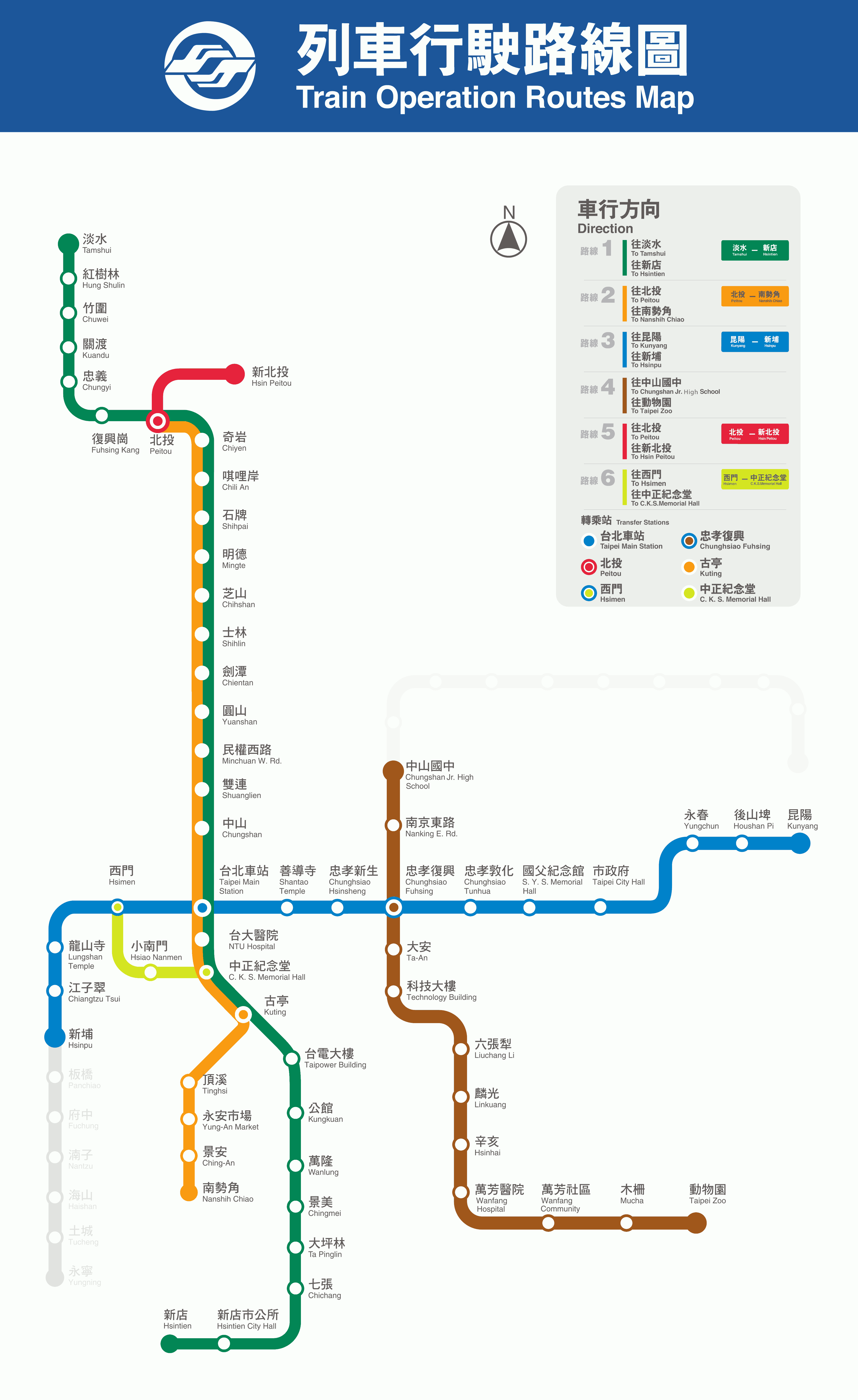
2004 system map

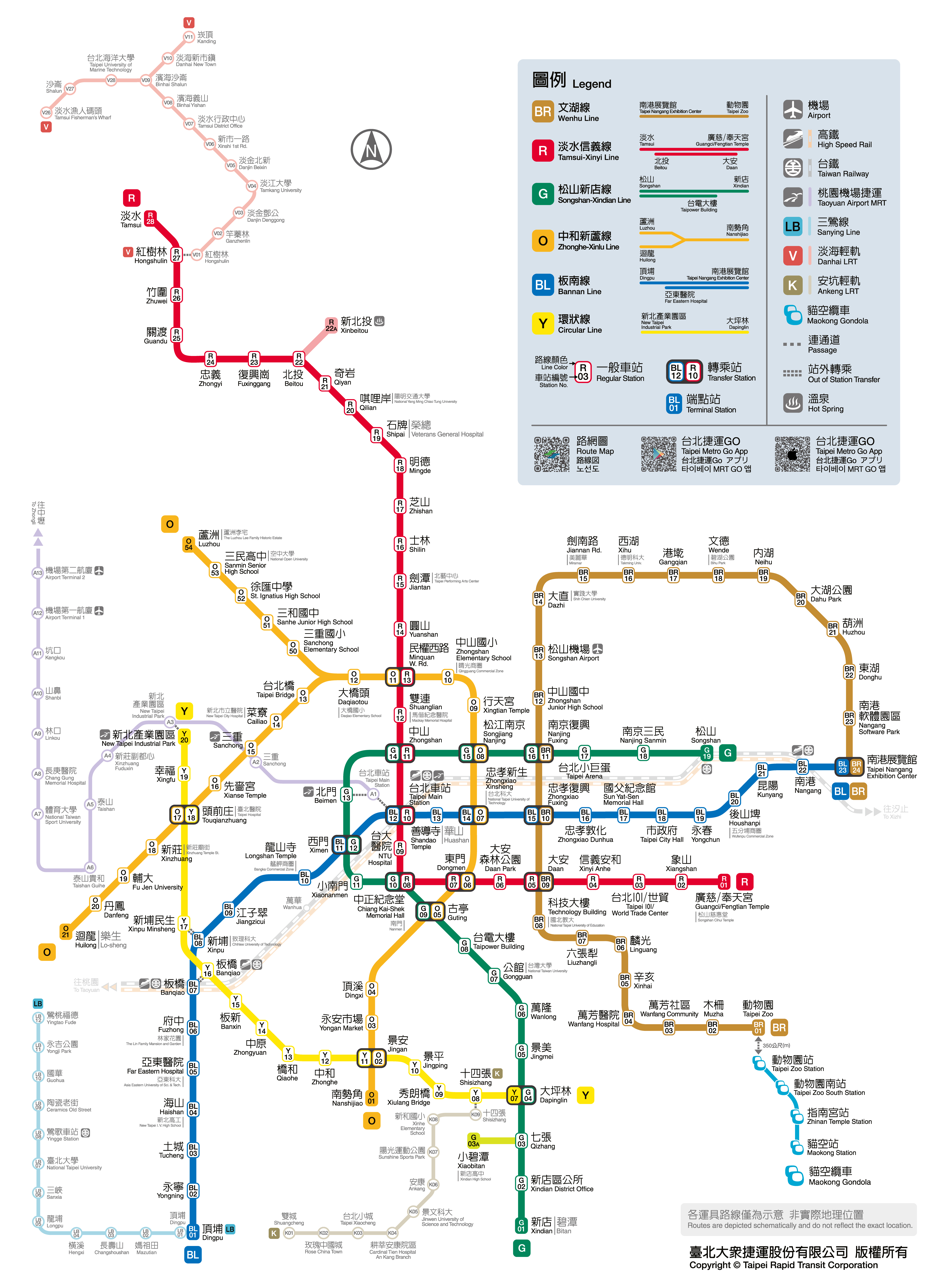
2026 system map

The idea of constructing a rapid transit system in Taipei was first introduced during a press conference on 28 June 1968. Although the Ministry of Transportation and Communications (MOTC) announced plans to research a metropolitan network, the project was shelved due to financial constraints and a perceived lack of urgency. However, as rapid economic growth in the 1970s brought severe traffic congestion, the need for a transit system became pressing. In February 1977, the MOTC's Institute of Transportation (IOT) released a preliminary report proposing five lines: U1, U2, U3, S1, and S2. This initial blueprint, which planned to convert several single-tracked Taiwan Railways Administration (TRA) branch lines, marked the first formal rapid transit plan for Taipei.

On 27 June 1986, the Preparatory Office of Rapid Transit Systems was created, which on 23 February 1987 was formally established as the Department of Rapid Transit Systems (DORTS) for handling, planning, designing, and constructing the system. Apart from preparing for the construction of the metro system, DORTS also made small changes to the metro corridor. The six lines proposed on the initial network were: Tamsui line and Xindian line (Lines U1 and U2), Zhonghe Line (Line U3), Nangang Line and Banqiao Line (Line S1), and Muzha line (now Wenhu line), totaling 79 stations and 76.8 km (47.7 mi) route length, including 34.4 km (21.4 mi) of elevated rail, 9.5 km (5.9 mi) at ground level, and 44.2 km (27.5 mi) underground. The Neihu Line corridor was approved in 1990. On 27 June 1994, the Taipei Rapid Transit Corporation (TRTC) was formed to oversee the operation of the Taipei Metro system.

The Executive Yuan approved the initial network plan for the system on 27 May 1986. Construction began on 15 December 1988. The growing traffic problems of the time, compounded by road closures due to TRTS construction led to what became popularly known as the "dark age of Taipei traffic". The TRTS was the center of political controversy during its construction and shortly after the opening of its first line in 1996 due to incidents such as computer malfunction during a thunderstorm, alleged structural problems in some elevated segments, budget overruns, and fare prices.

=== Opening and initial network ===
The system opened on 28 March 1996, with the 10.5 km (6.5 mi) elevated Wenhu Line, a driverless, medium-capacity line with twelve stations running from Zhongshan Junior High School to Taipei Zoo. The first high-capacity line, the Tamsui–Xinyi Line, began service on 28 March 1997, running from Tamsui to Zhongshan, then extended to Taipei Main Station at the end of the year. On 23 December 1998, the system passed the milestone of 100 million passengers.

=== 1999–2006 expansions ===
On 24 December 1999, a section of the Bannan Line was opened between Longshan Temple and Taipei City Hall. This section became the first east–west line running through the city, connecting the two previously completed north–south lines. On 31 May 2006, the second stage of the Banqiao–Nangang section and the Tucheng section began operation. The service was then named Bannan after the districts that it connects (Banqiao and Nangang).

=== Maokong Gondola ===
On 4 July 2007, the Maokong Gondola, a new aerial lift/cable-car system, was opened to the public. The system connects the Taipei Zoo, Zhinan Temple, and Maokong. Service was suspended on 1 October 2008 due to erosion from mudslides under a support pillar following Typhoon Jangmi. The gondola officially resumed service as of 31 March 2010, after relocation of the pillar and passing safety inspections.

=== 2009–2014 expansions ===
On 4 July 2009, with the opening of the Neihu segment of Wenhu Line, the last of the six core segments was completed. Due to debate on whether to construct a medium-capacity or high-capacity line, construction of the line did not begin until 2002.

Zhonghe–Xinlu Line was extended from Guting to Luzhou and Huilong in 2012. The Xinyi section of Tamsui–Xinyi Line and Songshan section of Songshan–Xindian Line were opened on 24 November 2013 and 15 November 2014 respectively.

Prior to 2014, only physical lines had official names; services did not. In 2008, all full-run and short-turn services were referred to by termini while Bannan and Wenhu services were referred to by the physical lines on which they operated.

Following the completion of the core sections of the system in 2014, the naming scheme for services was set and 'lines' started to refer to services. Between 2014 and 2016, lines were given alternative number names based on the order of the dates the lines first opened. Brown, Red, Green, Orange and Blue lines were named lines 1 to 5 respectively. The planned Circular, Wanda–Shulin and Minsheng–Xizhi lines were to be lines 6 to 8 respectively. In 2016, the number names were replaced by colour names. Today, on-board announcements in Chinese use full official names, whereas in English, colour names are used instead.

In June 2023, due to an increasing number of South Korean tourists, the metro announced the addition of Korean announcements at stations where there are high amounts of tourists.

On 3 April 2024, following a magnitude 7 earthquake hitting the island, all active MRT trains were suspended for safety checks to be conducted. All Taipei Metro routes resumed operations later that day.

== Lines ==
Geographical map

Track diagram of Taipei Metro

The system is designed based on the spoke-hub distribution paradigm, with most rail lines running radially outward from central Taipei. The MRT system operates daily from 06:00 to 00:00 the following day (the last trains finish their runs by 01:00), with extended services during special events (such as New Year festivities). Trains operate at intervals of 1:30 to 15 minutes depending on the line and time of day. Smoking is forbidden in the entire metro system, while eating, drinking, and chewing gum and betel nuts are forbidden within the paid area.

Stations can become extremely crowded during rush hours, especially at transfer stations such as Taipei Main Station, Zhongxiao Fuxing, and Minquan West Road. Automated station announcements are recorded in Mandarin, English, Taiwanese, and Hakka, with Japanese at busy stations. Japanese coverage across the network was expanded on 24 August 2023. Select stations also received Korean announcements to accommodate for the high influx of South Korean tourists to the capital. Subsequently, announcement order was changed to Mandarin, English, Japanese, Korean, then Taiwanese and Hakka.

Lines	Start and end	Length	Stations	Type	Depot	Date opened	Last extension
Wenhu Line	Taipei Zoo－Nangang Exhib Center	25.7 kilometres (16.0 mi)	24	Rubber-tyred metro (medium-capacity)	Muzha; Neihu	March 28, 1996	July 4, 2009
Tamsui–Xinyi Line	Guangci/Fengtian Temple－Tamsui	31.6 kilometres (19.6 mi)	29	Railway track (high-capacity)	Beitou	March 28, 1997	August 30, 2026
Xinbeitou Branch Line	Xinbeitou－Beitou	31.6 kilometres (19.6 mi)	1	Railway track (high-capacity)	Beitou	March 28, 1997	—N/a
Songshan–Xindian Line	Xindian－Songshan	19.7 kilometres (12.2 mi)	19	Railway track (high-capacity)	Xindian	December 24, 1998	November 15, 2014
Xiaobitan Branch Line	Xiaobitan－Qizhang	19.7 kilometres (12.2 mi)	1	Railway track (high-capacity)	Xindian	September 29, 2004	—N/a
Zhonghe–Xinlu Line	Nanshijiao－Huilong or Luzhou	31.5 kilometres (19.6 mi)	26	Railway track (high-capacity)	Zhonghe; Xinzhuang; Luzhou	December 24, 1998	June 29, 2013
Bannan Line	Dingpu－Nangang Exhib Center	28.2 kilometres (17.5 mi)	23	Railway track (high-capacity)	Tucheng; Nangang	December 24, 1999	July 6, 2015
Circular Line	Dapinglin－NT Industrial Park (Note: Nowadays, this line is operated by New Taipei Metro Corporation.)	15.4 kilometres (9.6 mi)	14	Railway track (medium-capacity)	South	January 31, 2020	—N/a

== Fares and tickets ==
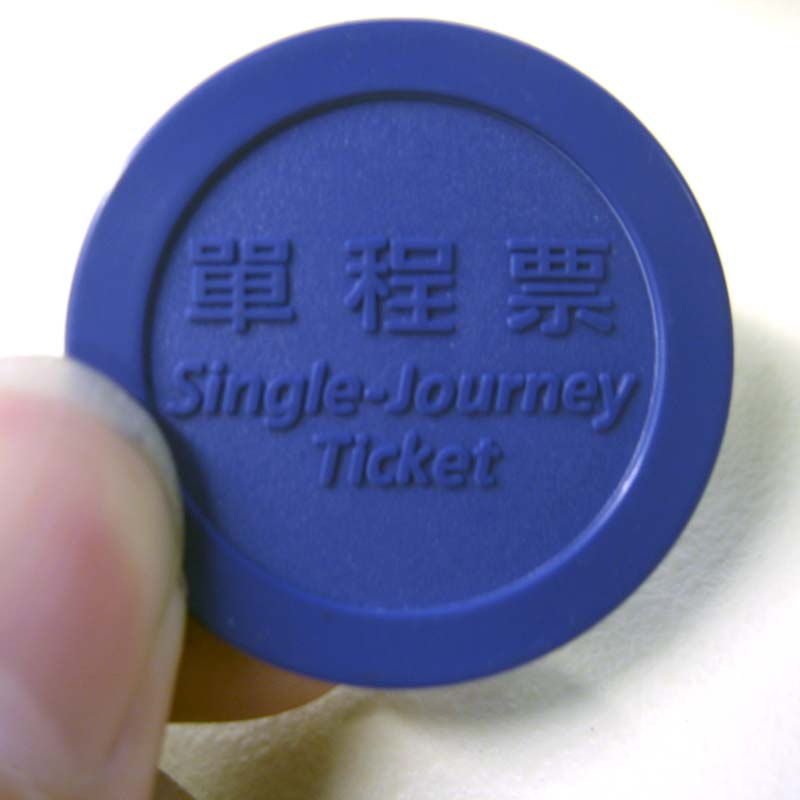
Single-journey RFID IC token

Fares range between NT$20–65 per trip as of 2018. RFID single-journey tokens and rechargeable IC cards (such as the EasyCard and the iPASS), as well as NFC-based mobile payments (only Google Wallet and Samsung Wallet), are used to collect fares for day-to-day use.

=== Discounts and concessions ===
A 20% discount was given to all IC card users, but it was cancelled at the start of February 2020. The discount program was instead switched to an intensity-based scheme. The more times passengers take the MRT, the higher the level of discount they could receive. From February 2020 until February 2025, the following rebate scheme was used: 10% discount for 11–20 rides; 15% discount for 21-30 rides; 20% discount for 31–40 rides; 25% discount for 41-50 rides; and 30% off for more than 50 rides. Effective March 2025, the rebate scheme was modified as follows: 5% discount for 11–20 rides; 10% discount for 21–40 rides; and 15% off for more than 40 rides. The discount is considered a rebate and the rebate from a previous month is deposited to the user's card on the first ride of each month; the rebate must be collected within 6 months. Those with welfare cards issued by local governments could receive 60% off per ride. Children aged 6 or over pay adult fares. Other ticket types include passes, joint tickets with other services and tickets for groups, and discounts for YouBike rentals at the Taipei Main Station.

=== Ticketing system ===
Taipei Metro faregates

Turnstiles of Taipei Metro are being replaced by the end of 2025 to enable contactless, QR code and mobile wallet payments. Contactless cards and mobile wallets are accepted starting from July 1, 2026.

== Infrastructure ==
Platform of Taipei Main Station

The Taipei Metro provides an obstacle-free environment within the entire system; all stations and trains are handicap accessible. Features include accessible restrooms, ramps and elevators for wheelchairs and strollers, tactile guide paths, extra-wide faregates, and trains with a designated wheelchair area.

Beginning in September 2003, the English names for Taipei Metro stations were converted to use Hanyu pinyin before the end of December, with brackets for Tongyong Pinyin names for signs shown at station entrances and exits. However, after the conversion, many stations were reported to have multiple conflicting English station names caused by inconsistent conversions, even for stations built after enactment of the new naming policy. The information brochures (臺北市大眾捷運系統捷運站轉乘公車資訊手冊) printed in September 2004 still used Wade–Giles romanizations. The updated names were actually poorly romanized for some stations (notably Daan and Qilian, formerly Ta'An and Chili An respectively), as they lack an apostrophe or other separator between ambiguous syllables as recommended in Hanyu Pinyin.

To accommodate increasing passenger numbers, all metro stations have replaced turnstiles with speed gates since 2007, and single-journey magnetic cards have been replaced by RFID tokens. TRTS provides free mobile phone connections in all stations, trains, and tunnels and also provides WiFi WLAN connections at several station hotspots. The world's first WiMAX-service metro trains were introduced on the Wenhu Line in 2007, allowing passengers to access the internet and watch live broadcasts. Several stations are also equipped with mobile charging stations.

=== Platforms ===
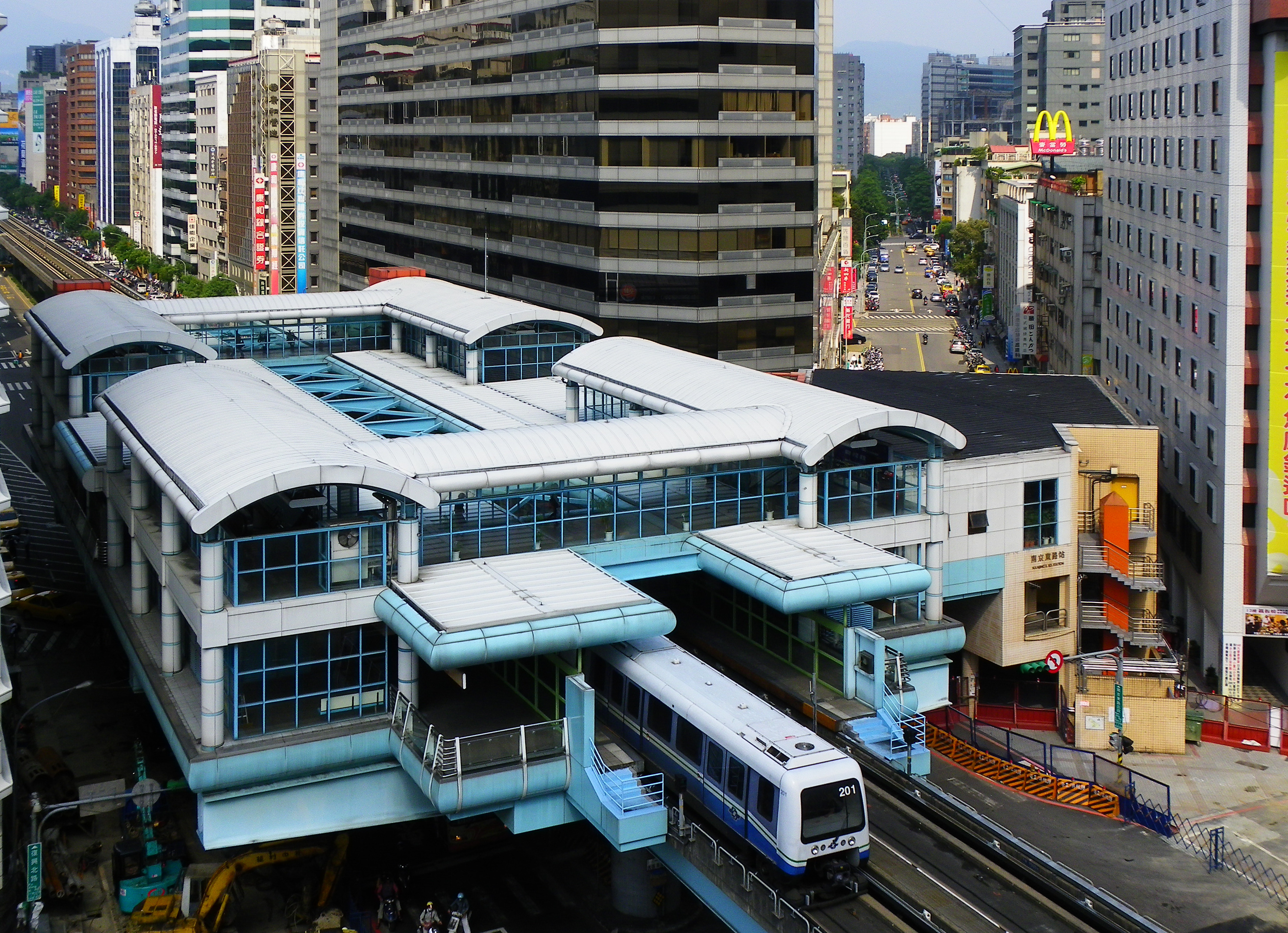
Nanjing Fuxing metro station

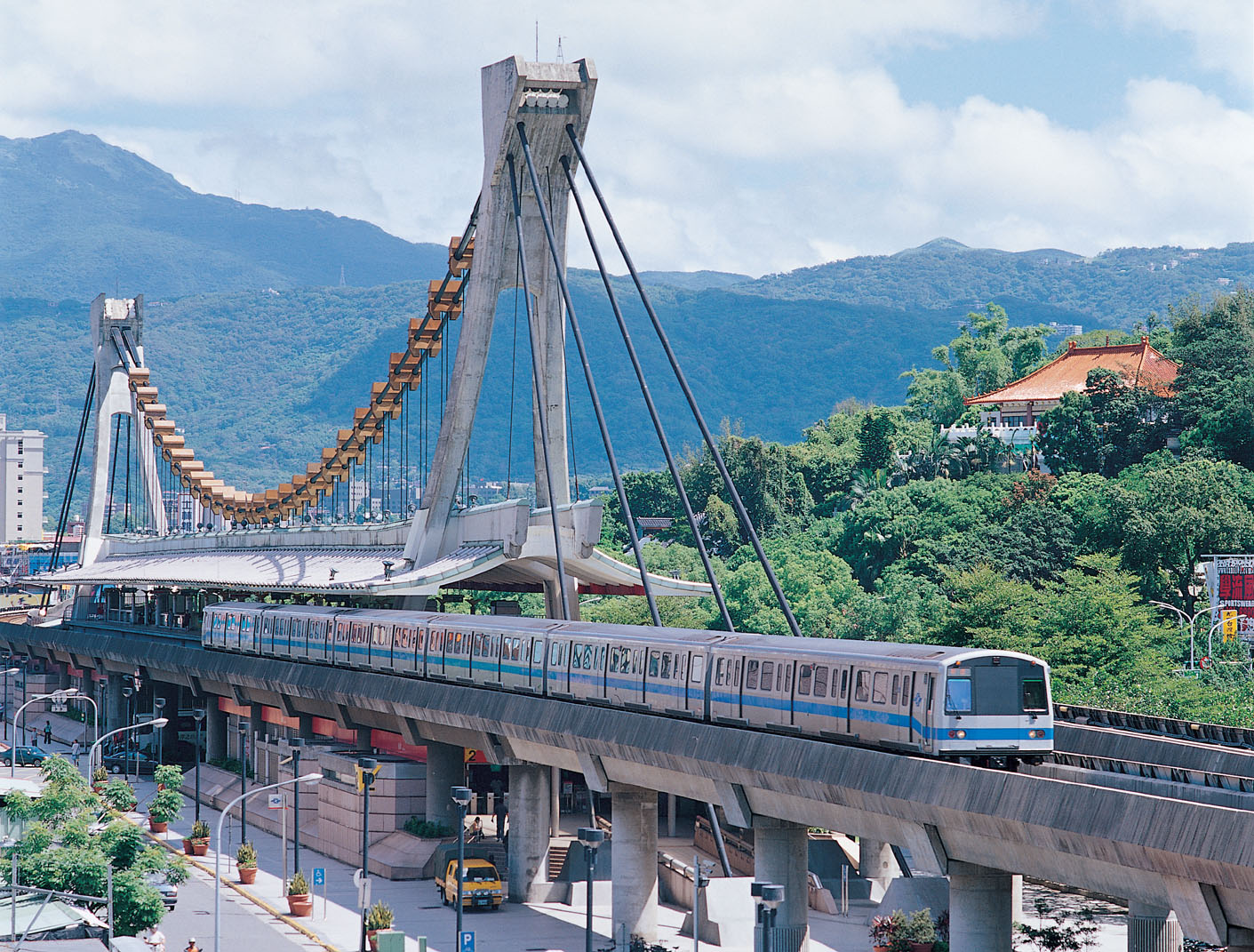
Unique dragon boat architecture of Jiantan on Tamsui–Xinyi Line

Platform at Taipei Nangang Exhibition Center

Most underground stations have island platform configurations while a few have side platform configurations. Most elevated and at-grade stations have side platform configurations, while a few have island platform configurations. All high-capacity metro stations have a 150 m (490 ft) long platform to accommodate all six-train cars on a typical metro train (with the exception of Xiaobitan). The width of the platform and concourse depends on the volume of transit; the largest stations include Taipei Main Station, Taipei City Hall, and Ximen. Some other transfer stations, including Chiang Kai-shek Memorial Hall, Guting, and Songjiang Nanjing, also have wide platforms.

Several stations have a cross-platform interchange: Chiang Kai-Shek Memorial Hall, Guting, Dongmen and Ximen. Both lines' tracks in one direction use the lower floor, while both lines' tracks in the other direction use the upper floor. Dongmen station is unique in that the directions of travel on each floor are reversed, so that there's a cross-platform interchange when travelling between the city center and the suburbs.

Each station is equipped with LED displays and LCD TVs both in the concourse and on the platforms which display the time of arrival of the next train. At all stations, red lights on or above automatic platform gates at stations flash prior to a train arrival to alert passengers and an arrival melody would play (except on the Wenhu Line and certain elevated and at-grade stations). Similarly, before platform screen doors were retrofitted, stations would have lights on the edges of platforms which would flash upon a train's arrival. This can still be seen on other metro systems such as the Washington Metro.

As of September 2018, all stations have automatic platform gates. Before 2018, all the stations on the Wenhu line and most stations on the Zhonghe–Xinlu Line, as well as a few stations on other lines, were equipped with platform screen doors. A track intrusion detection system has been installed to improve passenger safety at stations without platform doors. The system uses infrared and radio detectors to monitor unusual movement in the track area.

=== Signalling ===
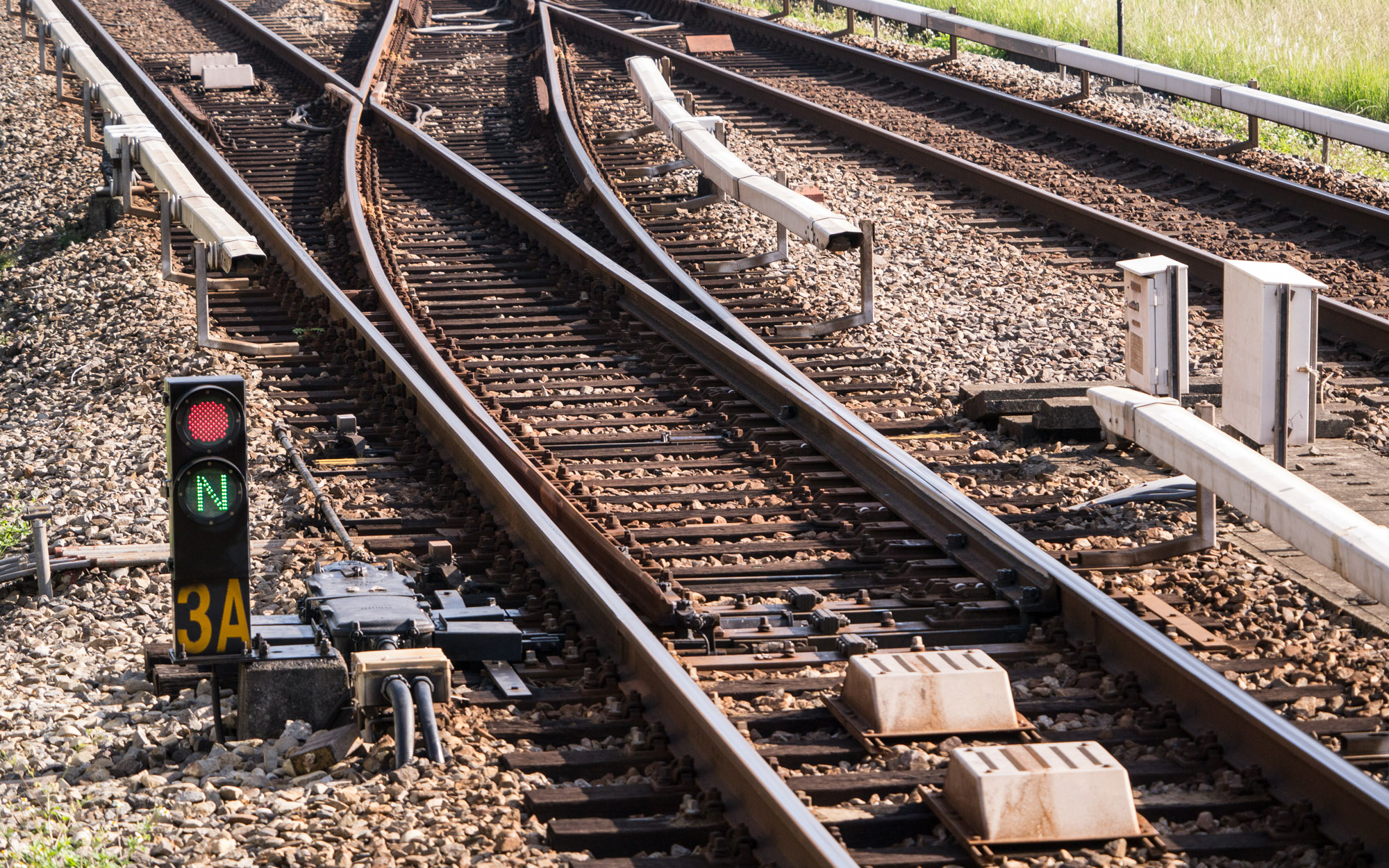
A wayside two-aspect signal and a track point on the Tamsui-Xinyi line

When the Muzha Line first opened in 1996, the line was initially equipped with automatic train operation (ATO) and automatic train control (ATC), which in turn comprised automatic train protection (ATP) and automatic train supervision (ATS); in particular the ATP relied on transmission coils and wayside control units whereas the ATO relied on dwell operation control units. The transmission coils are controlled by the Control Centre to ensure safety of the line and were positioned on the guideway. Among such coils included the PD loop, safety frequency loop, stopping program loop, vehicle station link and station vehicle link; these loops were cross-arranged to produce electromagnetic induction with the interval between two cross points being 0.3 seconds to both monitor the train and control its speed. However this fixed-block ATC system used on the Muzha Line was plagued with problems in its early years of operation and was replaced with the new moving-block Cityflo 650 CBTC that was supplied by Bombardier Transportation of Canada for the Neihu Line.

On the other hand, the heavy-capacity lines use the traditional fixed block system design, which were initially supplied by General Railway Signal of Rochester, New York, for the Tamsui, Xindian, Zhonghe, and Bannan lines; and later by Alstom for the Tucheng, Xinzhuang, Luzhou, Xinyi and Songshan lines. Key components of the system include impedance bond, 4-foot loops, marker coils, alignment antennae and two-aspect light signals for the wayside as well as automatic train supervision which utilises centralized traffic control.

=== Public art ===
In the initial network, important stations such as transfer stations, terminal stations, and stations with heavy passenger flow were chosen for the installation of public art. The principles behind the locations of public art were visual focus and non-interference with passenger circulation and construction schedules. The artworks included murals, children's mosaic collages, sculptures, hung forms, spatial art, interactive art, and window displays. The selection methods included open competitions, invitational competitions, direct assignments, and cooperation with children.

Stations with public art displays include Shuanglian, NTU Hospital, Chiang Kai-shek Memorial Hall, Guting, Gongguan, Xindian, Xiaobitan, Dingxi, Nanshijiao, Taipei City Hall, Kunyang, Songshan Airport, Nangang, Haishan, and Tucheng. Stations with art galleries include Zhongshan, Chiang Kai-shek Memorial Hall, Zhongxiao Fuxing, and Taipei Main Station. Beimen station contains a small archeological museum.

=== Other facilities ===
In addition to the rapid transit system itself, Taipei Metro operates several public facilities such as underground shopping malls, parks, and public squares in and around stations, including:

- Zhongshan Metro Mall: Shuanglian – Zhongshan – Taipei Main Station (815 m, 81 shops)
- Taipei main station underground mall: on floor B1 of the station
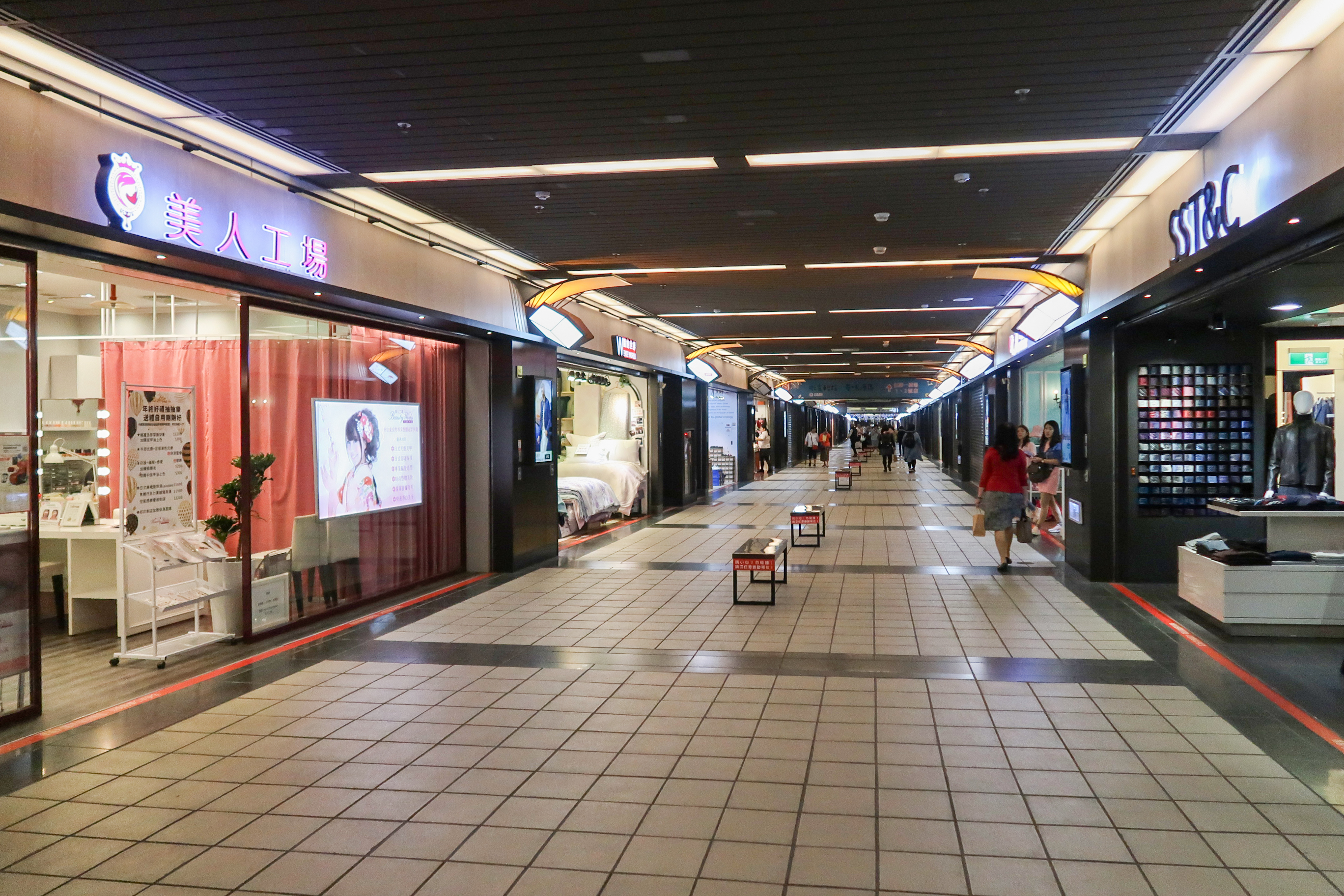
- Taipei East Metro Mall
  Taipei New World Shopping Center: Between the metro and TRA sections of Taipei Station.
- Station front metro mall: West of Taipei main station, beneath Zhongxiao W Road
- Taipei City Mall: Northwest of Taipei main station, beneath Zhengzhou Rd and Civic Blvd
- East Metro Mall: Between Zhongxiao Fuxing and Zhongxiao Dunhua (825 m, 35 shops)
- Ximen Underground Mall: north of Ximen (currently used as an office building and library)
- Longshan Temple Underground Mall: Longshan Temple north and south sides
- Global Mall: Banqiao floors B1 to 2F

As of 2022, there were 229 shops within the stations themselves.

=== Transit ===
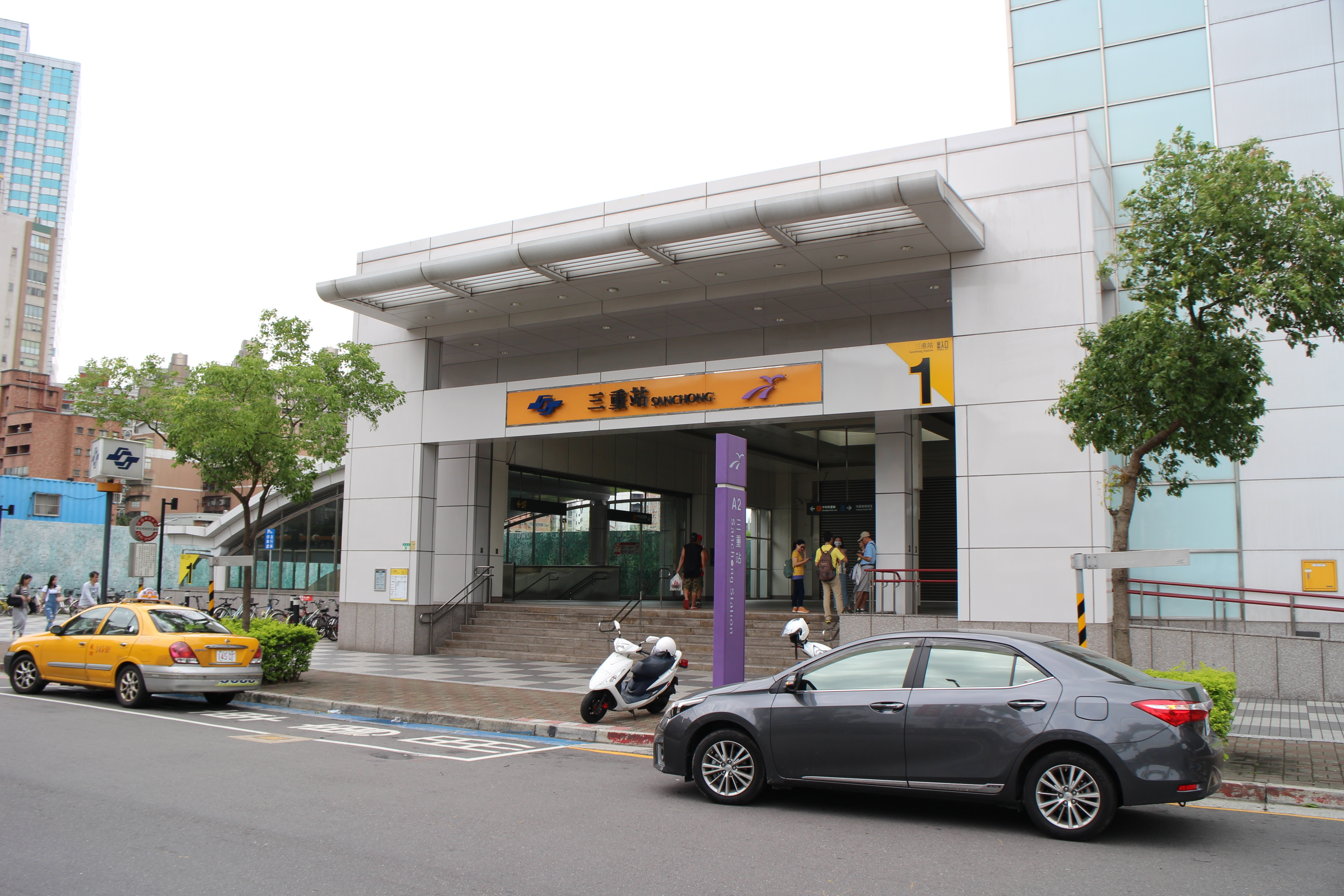
Sanchong is a transfer station between the Taipei Metro and the Taoyuan Airport MRT.

Transfers to city bus stations are available at all metro stations. In 2009, transfer volume between the metro and bus systems reached 444,100 transfers per day (counting only EasyCard users). Connections to Taiwan Railway Administration and Taiwan High Speed Rail trains are available at Taipei Main Station, Banqiao and Nangang. Connections to Taipei Bus Station and Taipei City Hall Bus Station are available at Taipei Main Station and Taipei City Hall stations, respectively. The Maokong Gondola is accessible from Taipei Zoo.

Taipei Songshan Airport is served by the Songshan Airport station. A metro system to connect Taipei to Taoyuan International Airport has also been available since March 2017.

Connections with the New Taipei Metro are also available, specifically with the Circular line and Danhai LRT.

== Rolling stock ==
All rolling stock on the Taipei Metro are electric multiple units, powered by a third rail at 750 volts direct current. Each train is equipped with automatic train operation (ATO) for a partial or complete automatic train piloting and driverless functions.

=== Medium-capacity trains ===
The medium-capacity trains of Wenhu Line are 1,880 mm (6 ft 2 in) broad gauge rubber-tired trains with no onboard train operators but are operated remotely by the medium-capacity system operation control center. It initially used a fixed-block automatic train control (ATC) system. Each train consists of two 2-car electric multiple unit (EMU) sets, with a total of 4 cars. The Wenhu line is the only line on the system to have no open-gangway carriages, meaning that passengers cannot move between carriages when the train is moving.

The Wenhu Line was initially operated with VAL 256 trains cars, where two VAL 256 cars in the same set would share the same road number. As a result of this numbering scheme, the 102 cars of the VAL fleet have car numbers from 1 to 51. In June 2003, Bombardier was awarded a contract to supply the Wenhu Line with 202 INNOVIA APM 256 train cars, to install the CITYFLO 650 moving-block communications-based train control (CBTC) system to replace the fixed-block ATC system and also to retrofit the existing 102 VAL 256 cars with the CITYFLO 650 CBTC system. Integration of Bombardier's trains with the existing Wenhu Line proved to be difficult in the beginning, with multiple system malfunctions and failures during the first three months of operation. Retrofitting older trains also took longer than expected, as the older trains must undergo several hours of reliability tests during non-service hours. The VAL 256 trains resumed operations in December 2010.

=== High-capacity trains ===
The high-capacity trains have steel wheels and are operated by an on-board train operator. The trains are computer-controlled. The operator, who is both driver and conductor, is responsible for opening and closing the doors and making (not all) announcements. Most announcements are pre-recorded in Mandarin, English, Hokkien and Hakka, with Japanese and Korean at busy stations. The ATC provides the functions of ATP, ATO and ATS and controls all train movements, including braking, acceleration and speed control, but can be manually overridden by the operator in case of an emergency. Newer trains also use a Train Supervision Information System (TSIS) supplied by Mitsubishi Electric that allows the operator to monitor the conditions of the train and identify any faults.

Each train consists of two 3-car Electric Multiple Unit (EMU) sets, with a total of 6 cars. Each 3-car EMU set is permanently coupled as DM–T–M, where DM is the motor car with full-width cab, T is a trailer car and M is the motor car without cab. Each motor car has four 3-phase AC traction motors. The configuration of a 6-car train is DM–T–M+M–T–DM, not interchanged with other car types. Like many contemporary metro rolling stock designs such as the MOVIA by Bombardier, each train features open gangways, allowing passengers to move freely between cars.

All carriages of the heavy-capacity trains are 3.2 metres (10 ft 6 in) wide by 3.6 metres (11 ft 9 3/4 in) high, and have a total capacity of 368 passengers, 60 of which seated. Their design maximum speed is 90 km/h (56 mph), which is limited to 80 km/h (50 mph) in service.

The first digit of a DM car is 1, while that of a T car is 2 and that of an M car is 3. This digit then follows the three digits of the set number. For example, C301 set 001/002 consists of carriages 1001-2001-3001+3002-2002-1002.

A single set cannot be in revenue service except C371 single sets 397–399, where their M car is exactly a DM car despite its first digit being 3. These single sets run exclusively on the Xinbeitou and Xiaobitan branch lines. Before the C371 single sets were in revenue service on 22 July 2006, the M cars of C301 sets 013/014 were converted to temporary cab cars to run the Xinbeitou branch.

In 2010, the new C381 was built for Taipei Metro to cope with increasing passenger ridership and the expansion of its network route. Upon entering service on 7 October 2012, three C381 trainsets are servicing the Beitou – Taipower Building segment of the Tamsui and Xindian Lines, with the remaining fleet being put into service on 20 October 2012. These trains provided much-needed capacity increase when the Xinyi and Songshan extensions opened in late 2013. After November 2014, the C381 trains are serving both Tamsui–Xinyi Line and Songshan–Xindian Line. Whereas the earlier heavy capacity train types have largely retained the same design, the C381 sets are more distinctive with double blue stripes and the re-positioning of the logo from the driver's door to well below the passenger's windows, right on the stripe. Also placed were the more "sleeker" cab and the new advertising screens (as seen in newer Japanese commuter trains such as the E233 series) to improve energy efficiency, although it retains the same propulsion as the C371s.

In March 2024, it was announced that seven additional trains (42 cars) would be built by Hyundai Rotem and introduced between 2026 and 2028 to further cope with increasing passenger ridership. These trains are expected to contain fewer seats per carriage, but in turn increase total capacity per carriage.The first two sets are expected to enter service on the Red line in 2027.

=== Fleet roster ===
==== Medium-capacity fleet ====
Car type	Photo	Year built	Builder(s)	Train length (m)	Capacity (seated/standing)	Max. speed (Note: Design/Service) (km/h)	Fleet total	Car set numbers	Line(s)	Depot(s)	Notes
VAL256		1989–1993	Matra, GEC Alsthom	55.12	24/114	80/70	102	01–51	Wenhu line	Muzha, Neihu	Formed of two married pairs; closed end cars
Innovia APM 256		2006–2007	Bombardier	55.12	20/142	90/70	202	101–201	Wenhu line	Muzha, Neihu	Formed of two married pairs; closed end cars
Alstom Metropolis		2023-	Alstom	70		90/80	140	1101-	Wanda–Zhonghe–Shulin line	Jincheng	

==== Heavy-capacity fleet ====
Car type	Photo	Year built	Builder(s)	Train length (m)	Fleet total	Car set numbers	Line(s)	Depot(s)	Notes
C301		1992–1994	Kawasaki, URC	141	132	001–044	Tamsui–Xinyi line	Beitou	6-car train in DM–T–M+M–T–DM configuration as two 3-car sets
C321 (Modular Metro)		1998–1999	Siemens	141	216	101–116; 175/176 (Note: Originally 117/118, number change due to 2014 Taipei Metro attack); 119–172	Bannan line	Nangang, Tucheng	6-car train in DM–T–M+M–T–DM configuration as two 3-car sets
C341 (Modular Metro)		2003	Siemens	141	36	201–212	Bannan line	Nangang, Tucheng	6-car train in DM–T–M+M–T–DM configuration as two 3-car sets
C371		2005–2009	Kawasaki, TRSC (Note: Second batch only)	141	321	301–338 (1st batch); 401–466 (2nd batch); 397–399 (for branch lines only)	Songshan–Xindian line Zhonghe–Xinlu line Xinbeitou branch line Xiaobitan branch line	Xindian (Note: 301–338, 397, 398); Zhonghe, Luzhou, Xinzhuang (Note: 401–466); Beitou (Note: 399)	Sets 301–338, 401–466: 6-car train in DM–T–M+M–T–DM configuration as two 3-car sets; Sets 397–399: 3-car train in DM–T–DM configuration as one 3-car set
C381		2010–2013	Kawasaki, TRSC	141.42	144	501–548	Tamsui–Xinyi line Songshan–Xindian line Bannan line	Beitou, (Note: 501–530) Xindian (Note: 531–548)	6-car train in DM–T–M+M–T–DM configuration as two 3-car sets
CR381A		2026–2028	Hyundai Rotem		60		Tamsui–Xinyi line	Beitou	6-car train in DM–T–M+M–T–DM configuration as two 3-car sets

=== Engineering trains ===
Taipei Metro also uses a fleet of specialised trains for maintenance of way purposes:

Car type	Purpose	Builder	Max. speed (km/h)	Length (m)	Lines used on
Barclay locomotive	Traction for maintenance rolling stock	Hunslet-Barclay	35	13.5	Tamsui–Xinyi line Xinbeitou branch line Songshan–Xindian line Xiaobitan branch line Zhonghe–Xinlu line Bannan line
Tamping machine	Track ballast tamping	Plasser & Theurer	0.25	29.2	Tamsui–Xinyi line Xinbeitou branch line Songshan–Xindian line Xiaobitan branch line Zhonghe–Xinlu line Bannan line
Railgrinder	Restore the profile and remove irregularities from worn tracks	Speno, Harsco	2–7	33	Tamsui–Xinyi line Xinbeitou branch line Songshan–Xindian line Xiaobitan branch line Zhonghe–Xinlu line Bannan line
Rail inspection vehicle	Measure and record rail track-related data	Plasser & Theurer	30	12.5	Tamsui–Xinyi line Xinbeitou branch line Songshan–Xindian line Xiaobitan branch line Zhonghe–Xinlu line Bannan line
Ultrasonic rail testing vehicle	Detects internal cracks within rail tracks using ultrasound	Speno	25	8.4	Tamsui–Xinyi line Xinbeitou branch line Songshan–Xindian line Xiaobitan branch line Zhonghe–Xinlu line Bannan line
High pressure cleaning car	Cleaning of rail tracks and third rail	China Steel Corporation	2–7	26	Tamsui–Xinyi line Xinbeitou branch line Songshan–Xindian line Xiaobitan branch line Zhonghe–Xinlu line Bannan line
Water storage and power car	Provides water source and propulsion for high pressure cleaning car	China Steel Corporation	2–7	26	Tamsui–Xinyi line Xinbeitou branch line Songshan–Xindian line Xiaobitan branch line Zhonghe–Xinlu line Bannan line
Vacuum cleaning vehicle	Remove tunnel sludge	China Steel Corporation	—N/a	19	Tamsui–Xinyi line Xinbeitou branch line Songshan–Xindian line Xiaobitan branch line Zhonghe–Xinlu line Bannan line
Flash welding vehicle	Rail welding	Plasser & Theurer	—N/a	16.24	Tamsui–Xinyi line Xinbeitou branch line Songshan–Xindian line Xiaobitan branch line Zhonghe–Xinlu line Bannan line
Rail crane wagon	Lifting heavy spare parts	China Steel Corporation	45	11.2/11.4/16.4/18.7	Tamsui–Xinyi line Xinbeitou branch line Songshan–Xindian line Xiaobitan branch line Zhonghe–Xinlu line Bannan line
Flat wagon	Carry spare parts	—N/a	—N/a	18.7	Tamsui–Xinyi line Xinbeitou branch line Songshan–Xindian line Xiaobitan branch line Zhonghe–Xinlu line Bannan line
Open wagon	Carry ballast	China Steel Corporation	—N/a	19.8	Tamsui–Xinyi line Xinbeitou branch line Songshan–Xindian line Xiaobitan branch line Zhonghe–Xinlu line Bannan line
Water tanker	Store water used for cleaning purposes	—N/a	2–7	—N/a	Tamsui–Xinyi line Xinbeitou branch line Songshan–Xindian line Xiaobitan branch line Zhonghe–Xinlu line Bannan line
Maintenance locomotive	Maintenance of way	Nicolas	—N/a	—N/a	Wenhu line

=== Depots ===
The system currently has nine depots, with more under construction.

Depot name	Year opened	Location	Rolling stock housed	Line(s) served
Muzha	1996	Wenshan, northeast of Taipei Zoo	VAL256, BT370	Wenhu line
Beitou	1997	Beitou, southwest of Fuxinggang	C301, C371 (single), C381	Tamsui–Xinyi line Xinbeitou branch line
Zhonghe	1998	Zhonghe, east of Nanshijiao	C371	Zhonghe–Xinlu line
Xindian	1999	Xindian, northwest of Xiaobitan	C371, C381	Songshan–Xindian line Xiaobitan branch line
Nangang	2000	Nangang, southeast of Kunyang	C321, C341	Bannan line
Tucheng	2006	Tucheng, southwest of Far Eastern Hospital	C321, C341	Bannan line
Neihu	2009	Nangang, northeast of Taipei Nangang Exhibition Center	VAL256, BT370	Wenhu line
Luzhou	2010	Luzhou, northwest of Luzhou	C371	Zhonghe–Xinlu line
Xinzhuang	2021	Xinzhuang, north of Huilong	C371	Zhonghe–Xinlu line

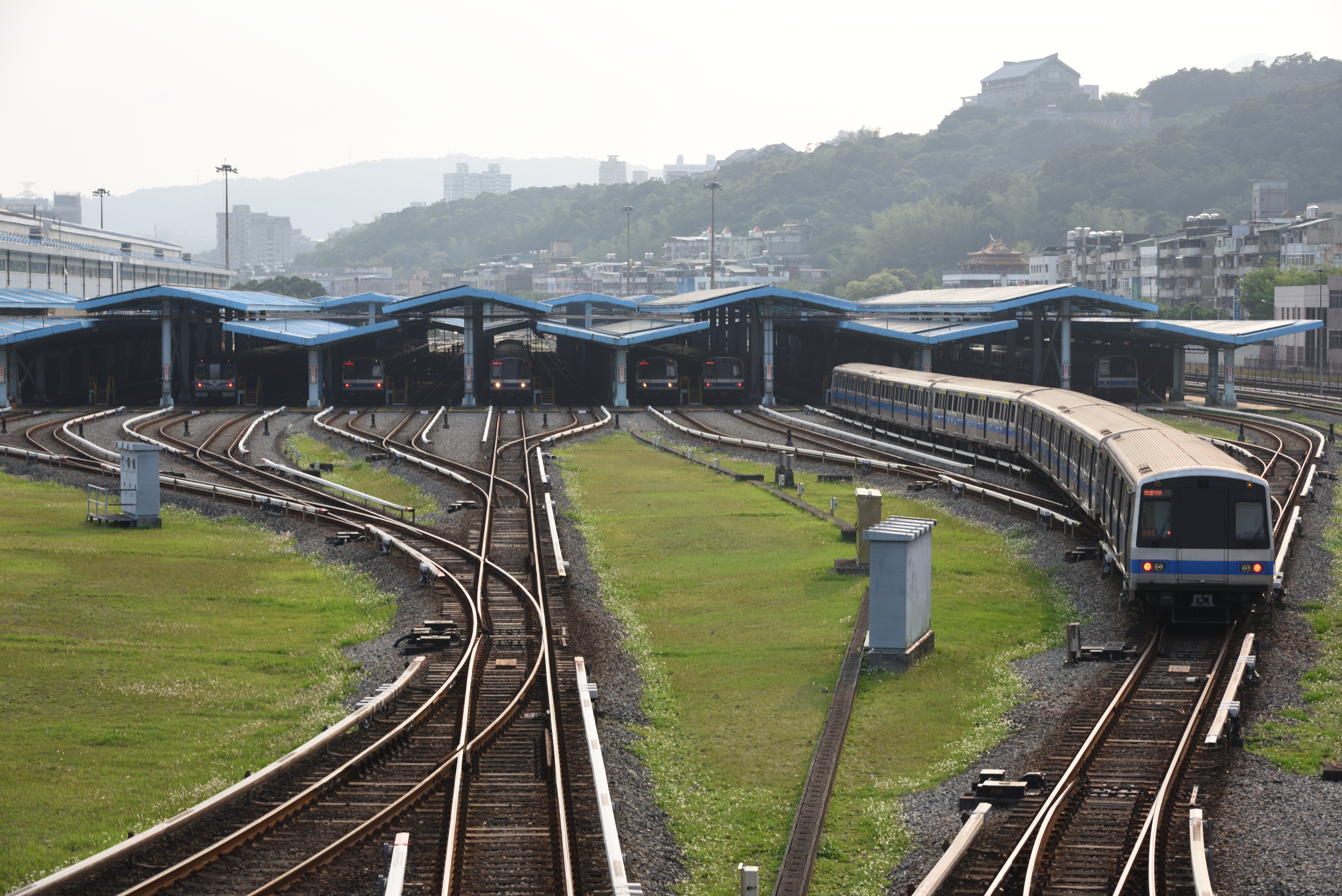
Beitou Depot stabling tracks

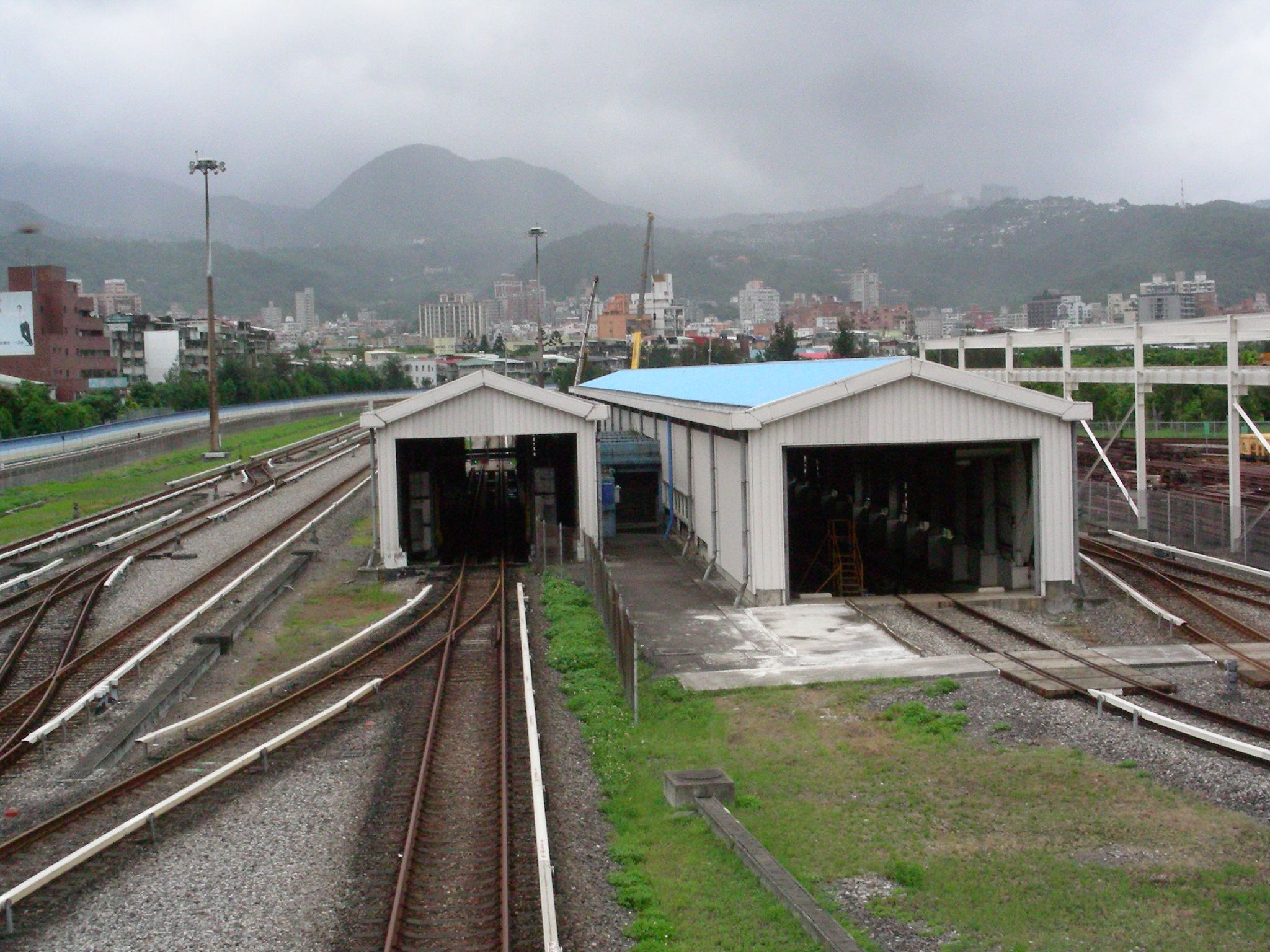
Train wash at Beitou Depot

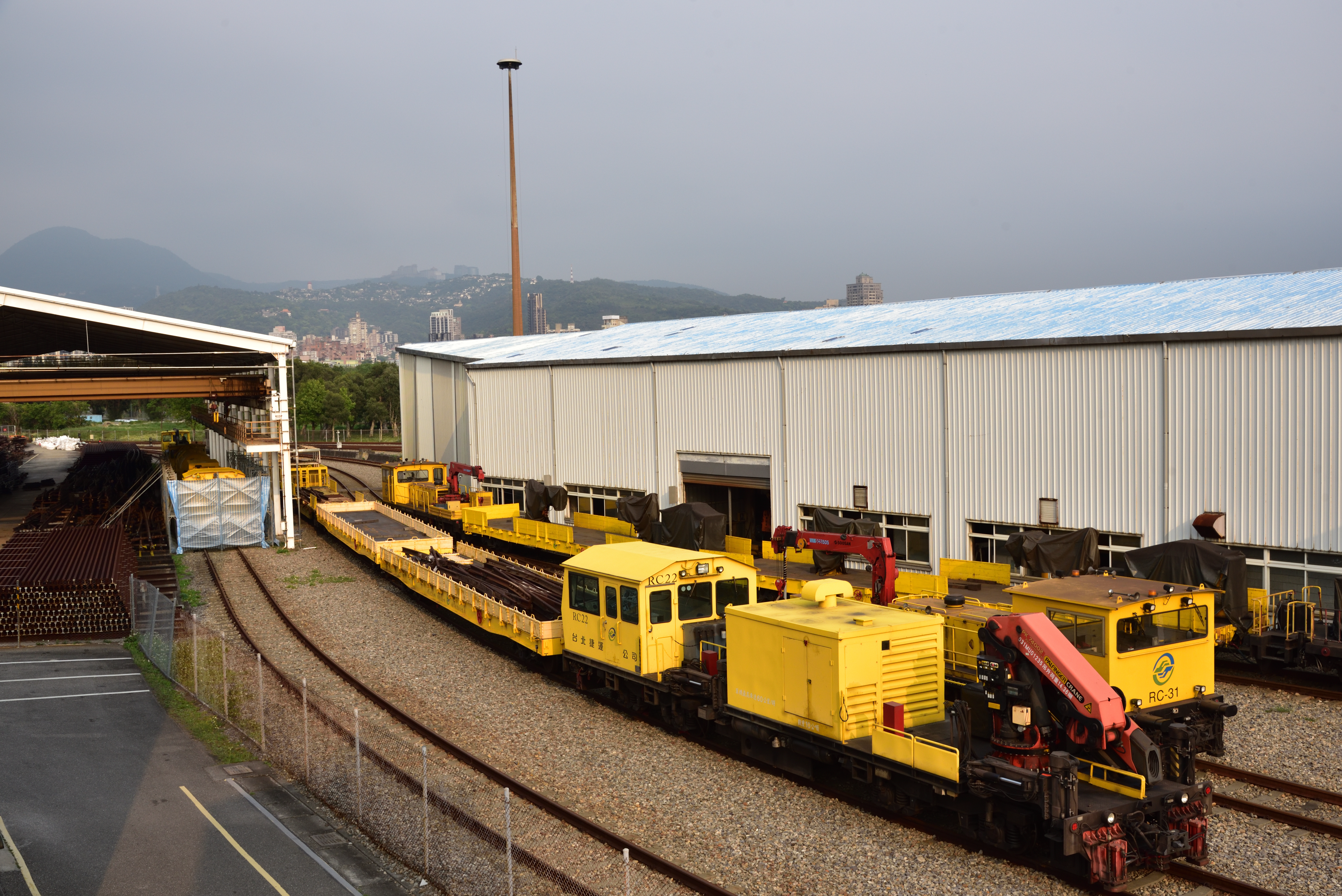
Engineering trains stabled at Beitou Depot

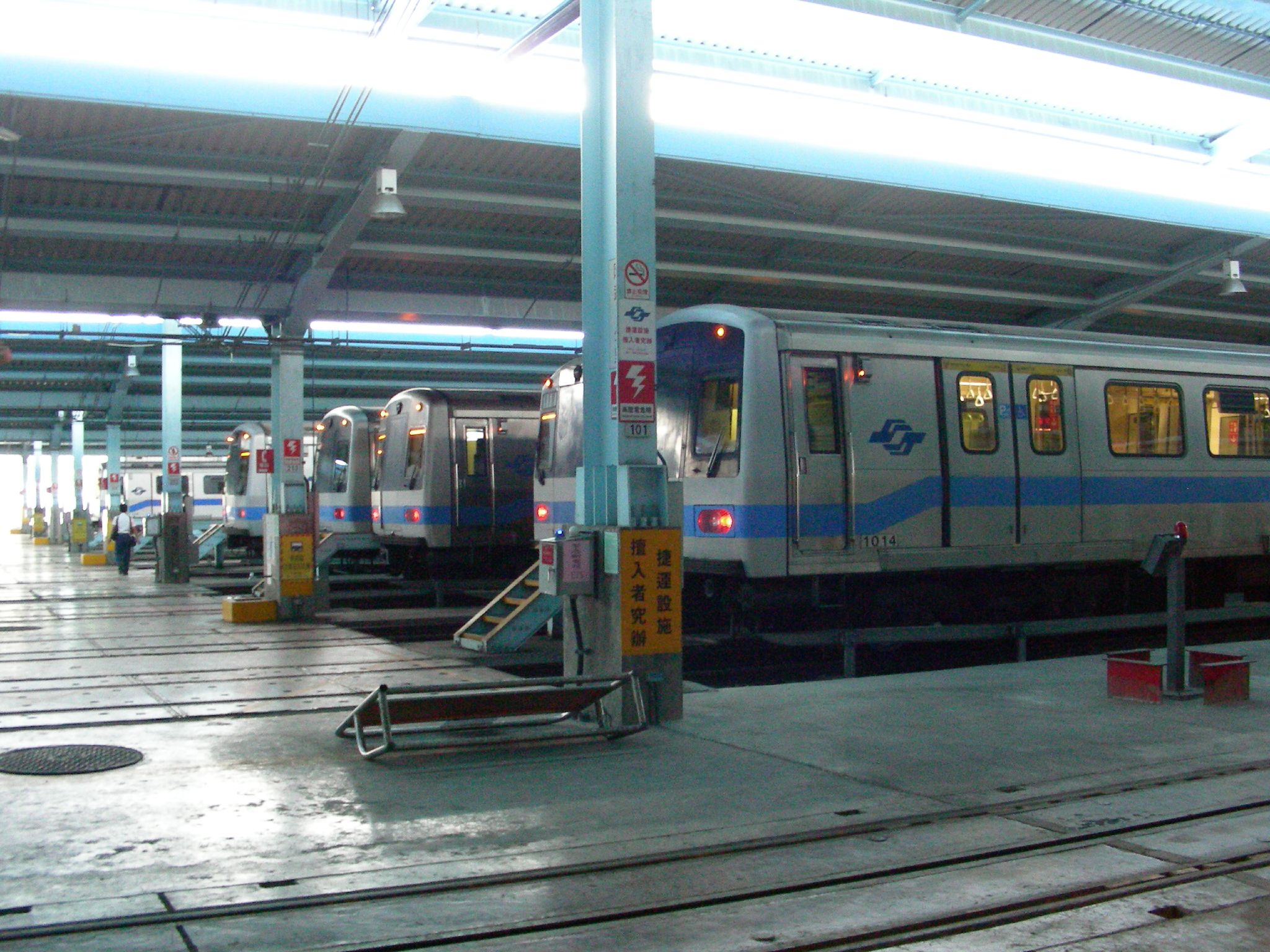
Inside Beitou Depot

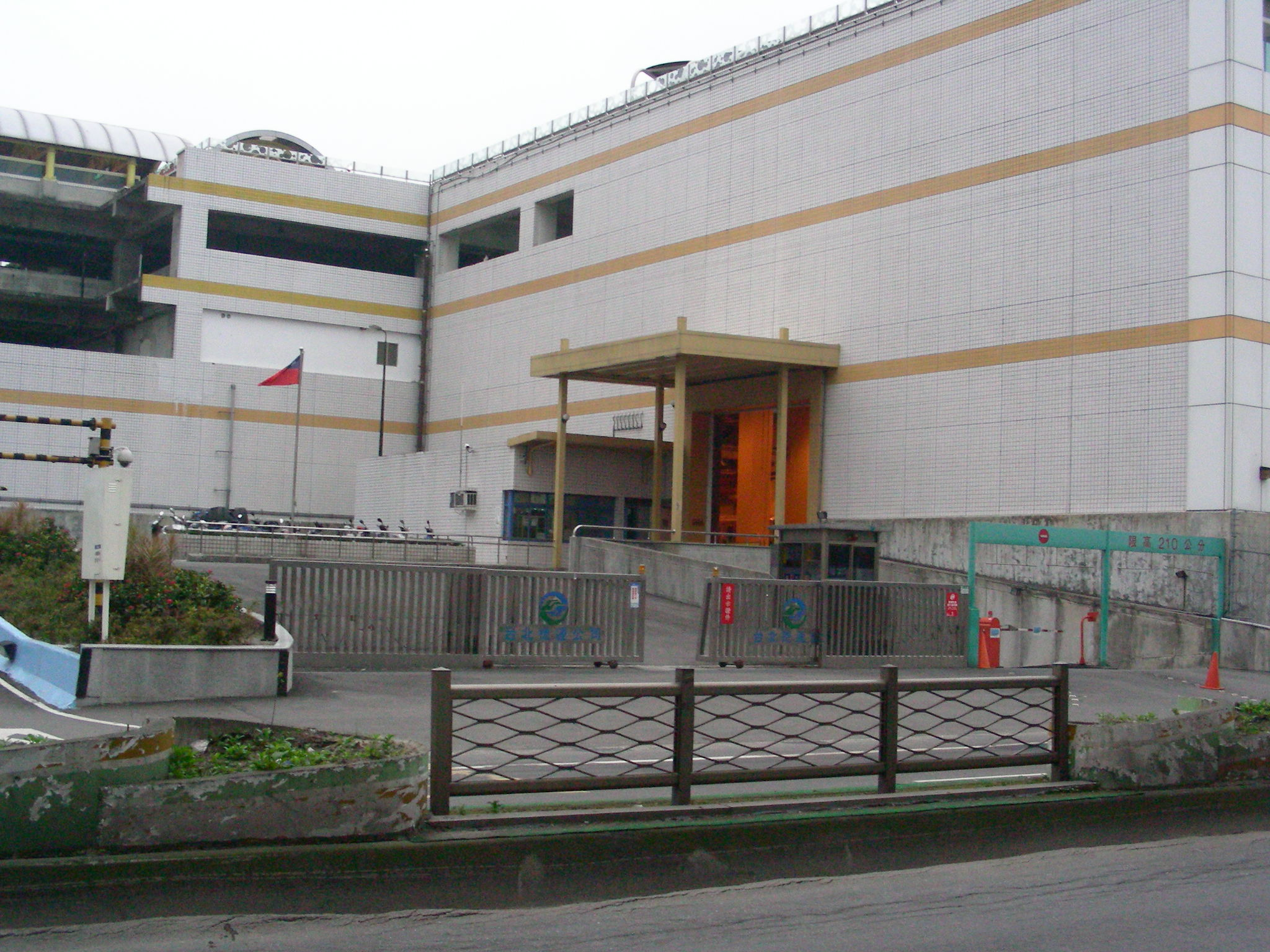
Xindian Depot building

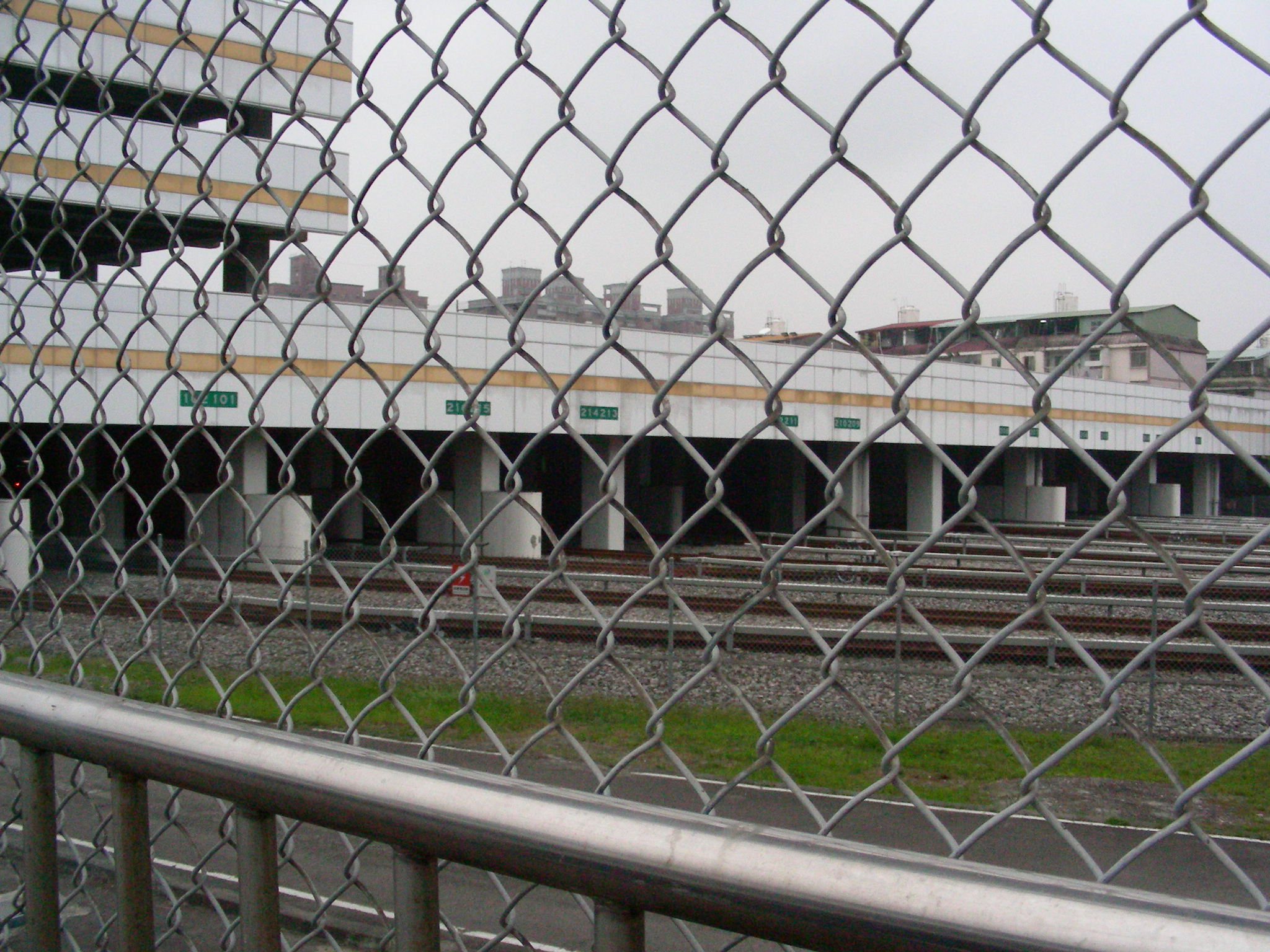
Xindian Depot stabling tracks

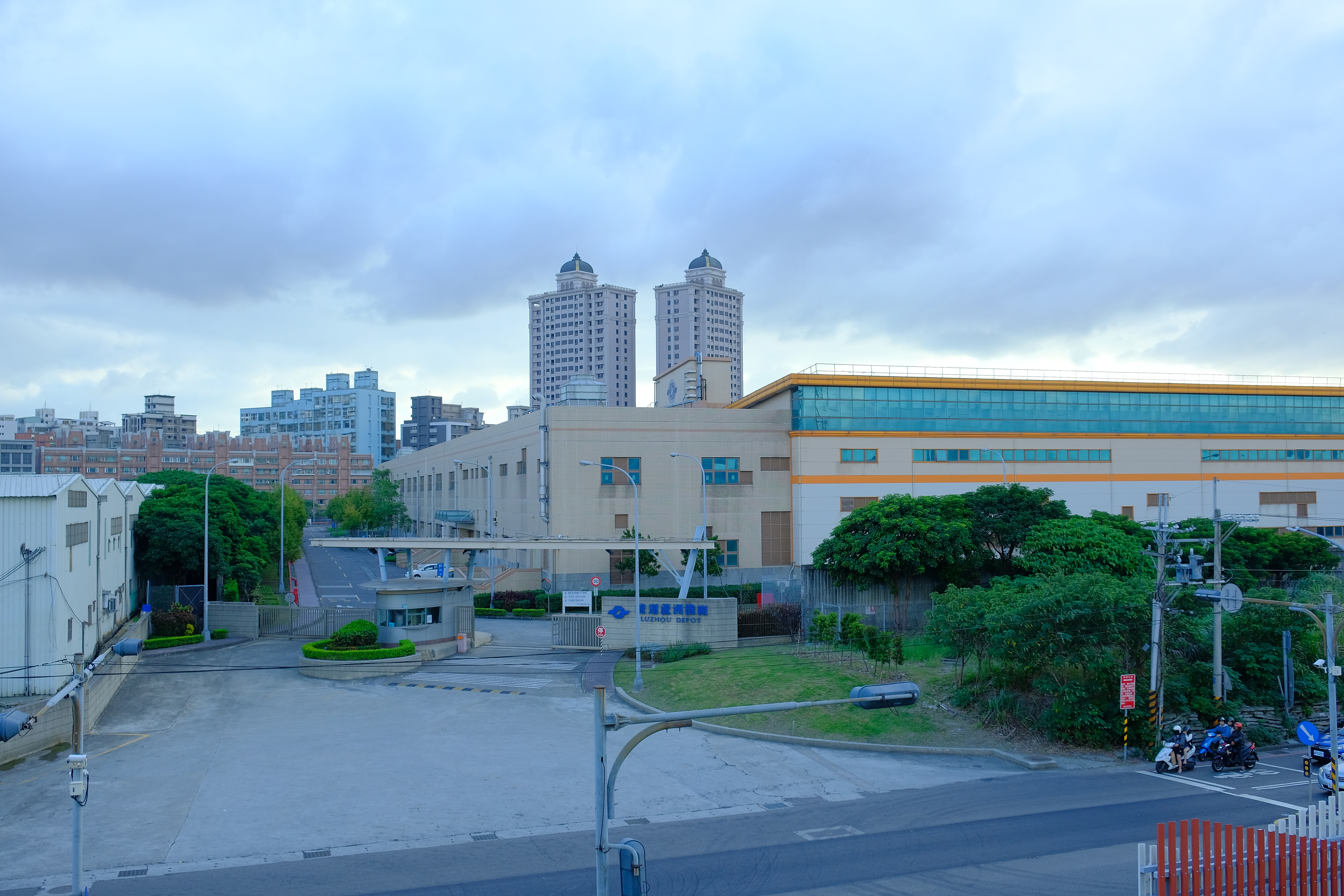
Entrance of Luzhou Depot

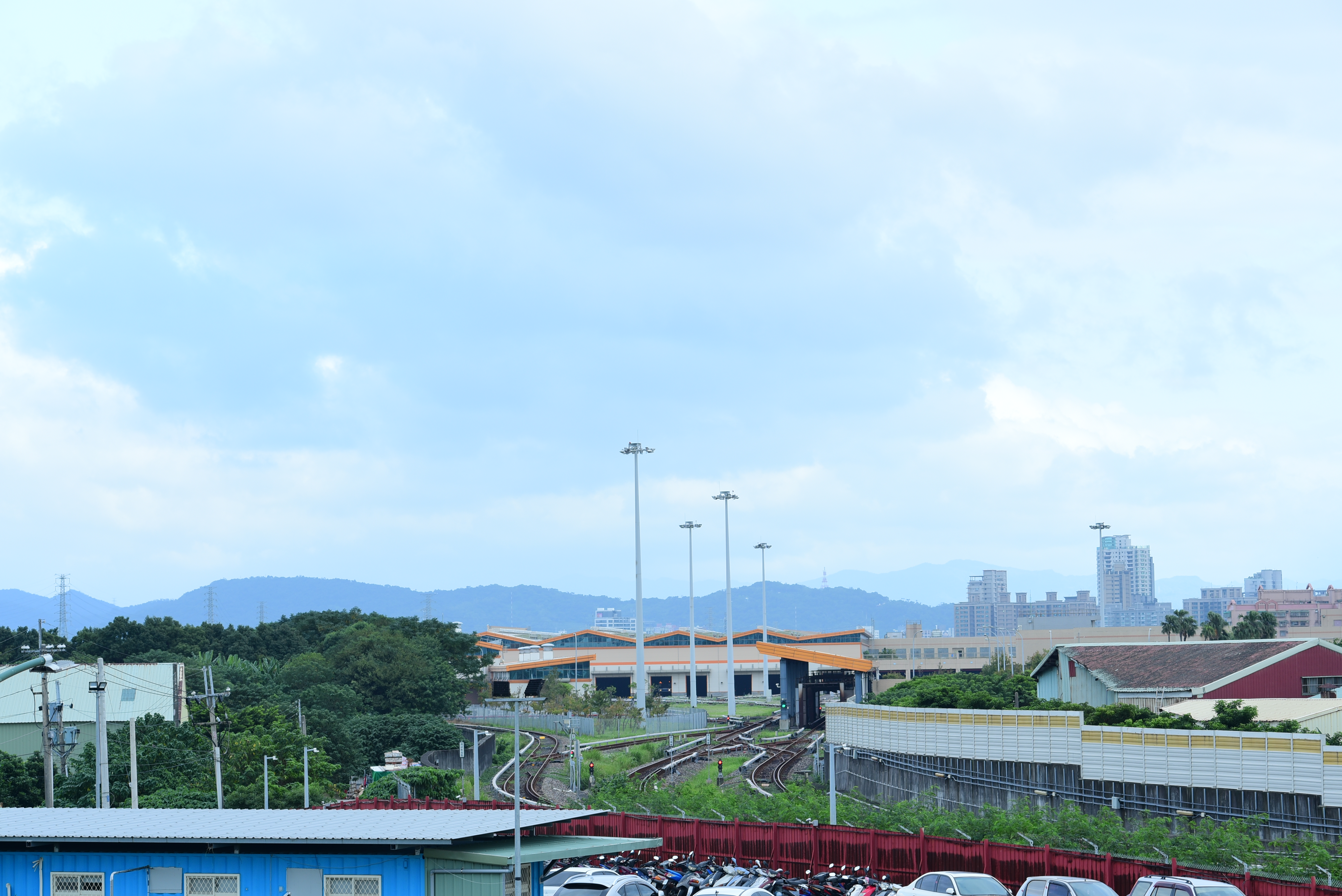
Luzhou Depot

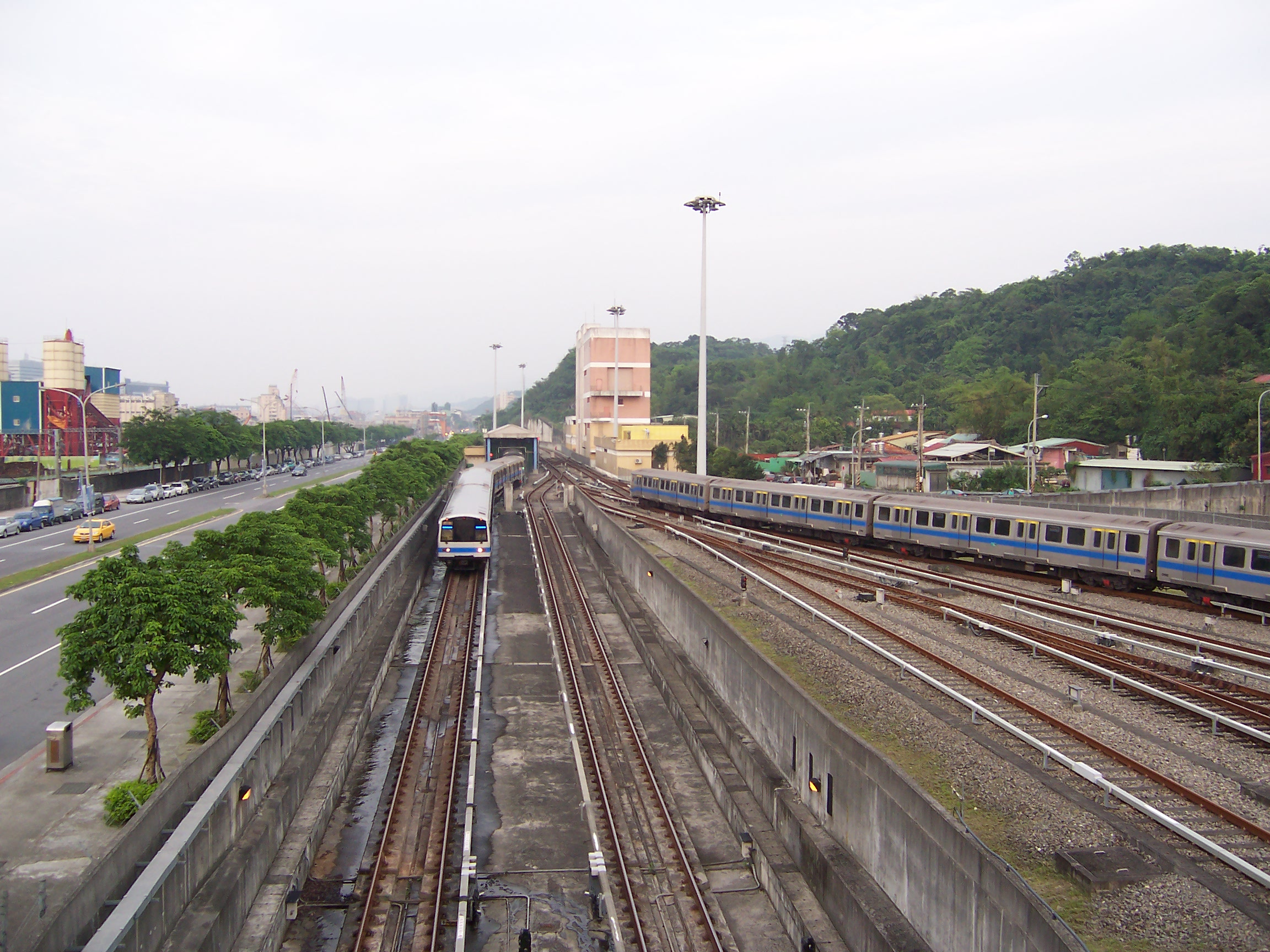
Nangang Depot reception and stabling tracks

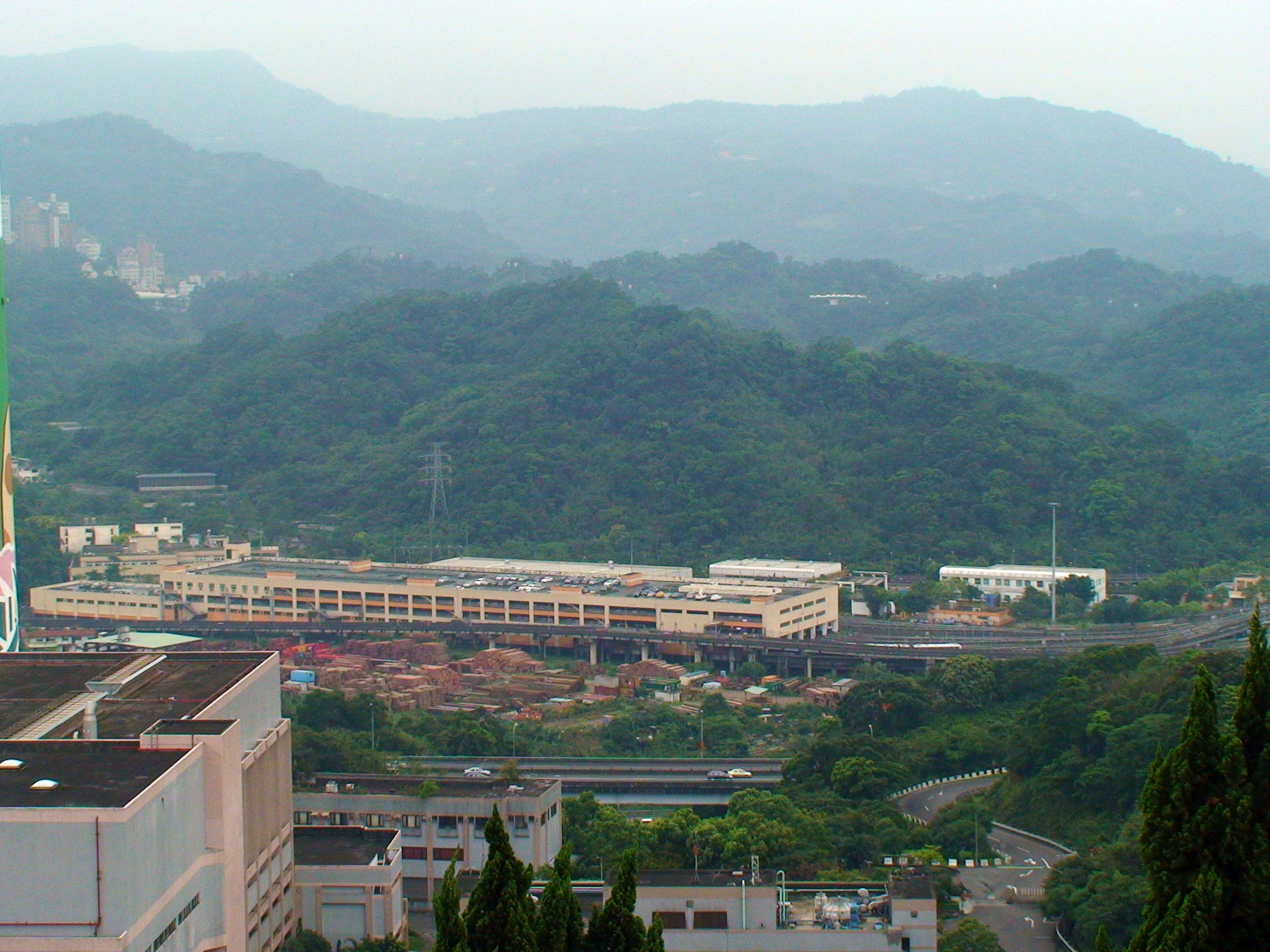
Birds-eye view of Muzha Depot

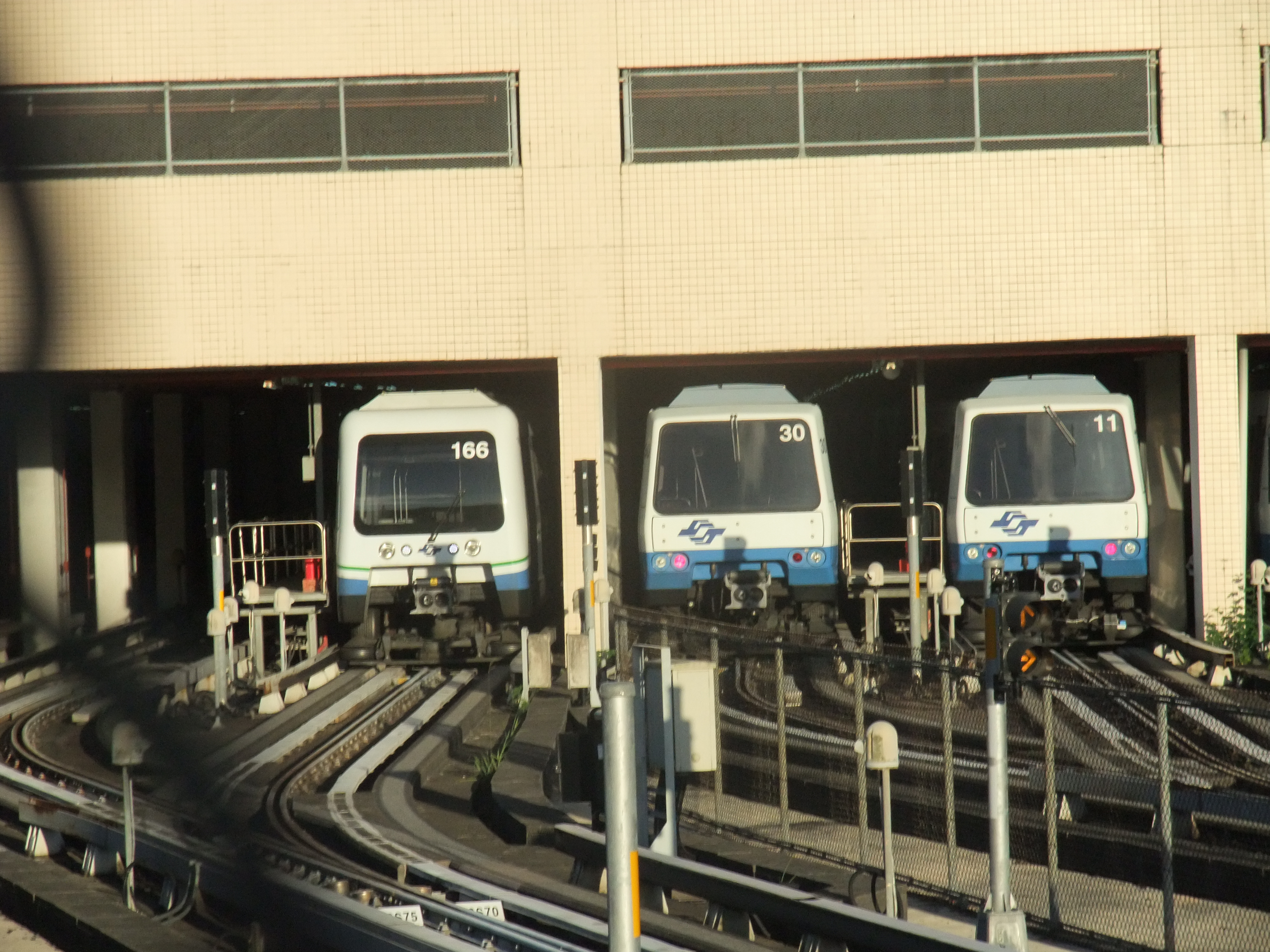
Trains stabled at Muzha Depot

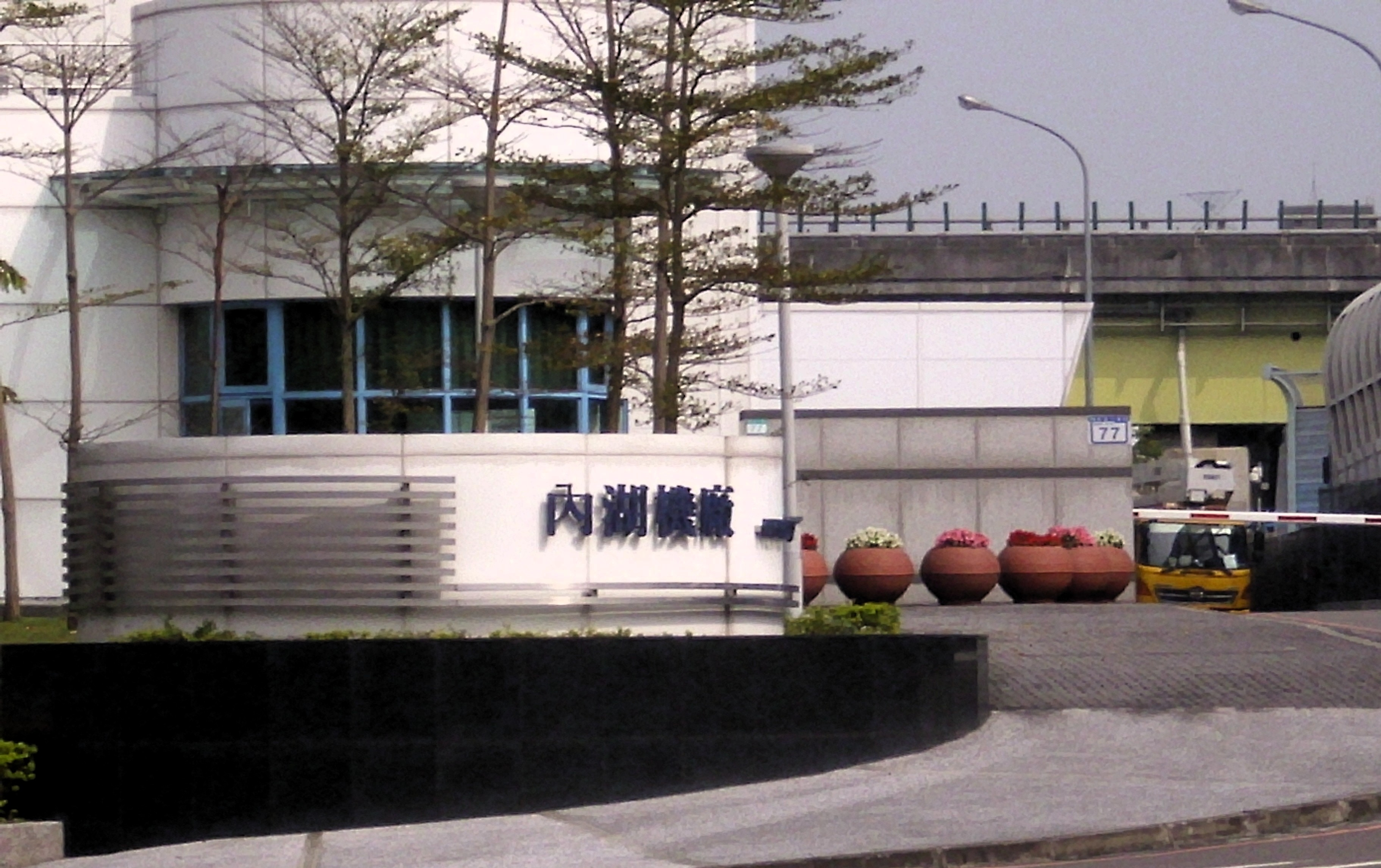
Entrance of Neihu Depot

== Reception ==
View source data.

Rapid transit ridership
Year	Millions of journeys	±% p.a.
2012	602.2	—
2013	635	+5.45%
2014	679.5	+7.01%
2015	717.5	+5.59%
2016	740	+3.14%
2017	746.1	+0.82%
2018	765.5	+2.60%
2019	789.6	+3.15%
2020	695.7	−11.89%
2021	531.1	−23.66%

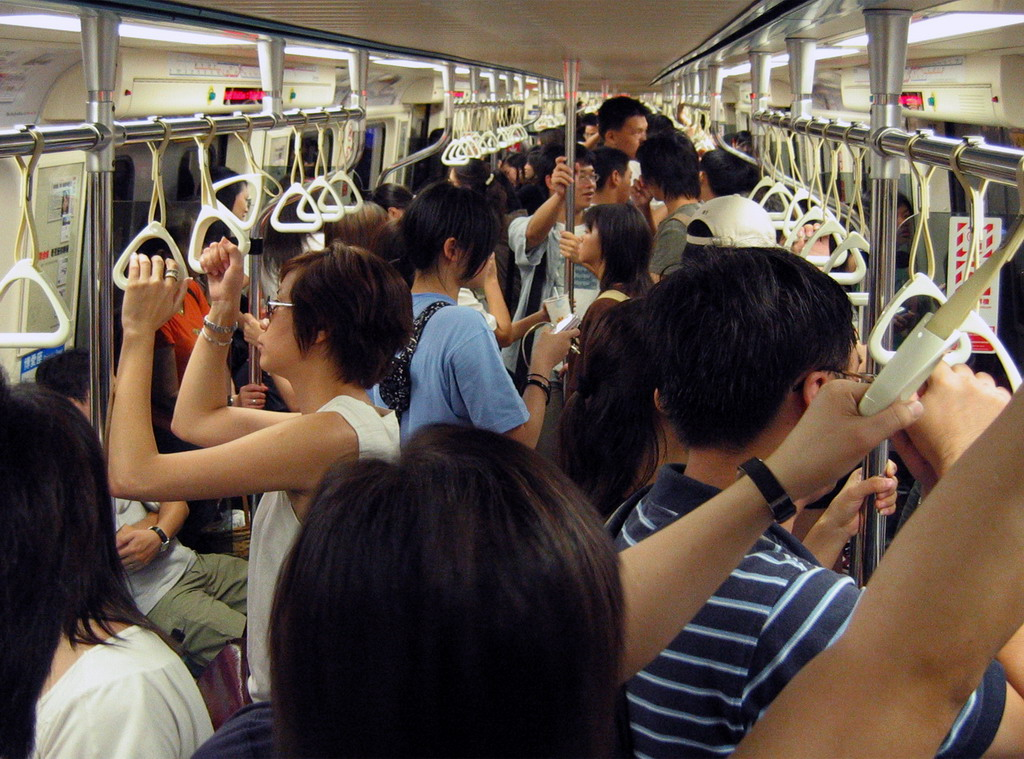
Inside a Taipei Metro train during rush hour

Taipei Metro is one of the most expensive rapid transit systems ever constructed, with phase one of the system costing US$18 billion and phase two estimated to have cost US$13.8 billion.

Despite earlier controversy, by the time the first phase of construction was completed in 2000, it was generally agreed that the metro project was a success, and it has since become an essential part of life in Taipei. The system has been effective in reducing traffic congestion in the city and has spurred the revival of satellite towns (like Tamsui) and development of new areas (like Nangang). The system has also helped to increase average vehicle speed for routes running from New Taipei into Taipei. Property prices along metro routes (both new and existing) tend to increase with the opening of more lines.

Since the Taipei Metro joined the Nova International Railway Benchmarking Group and the Community of Metros (Nova/CoMET) in 2002, it has started collecting and analysing data of the 33 Key Performance Indicators set by Nova/CoMET in order to compare them with those of other metro systems around the world, as a reference to improve its operation. Taipei Metro also has gained keys to success from case studies on different subjects such as safety, reliability, and incidents, and from the operational experiences of other metro systems.

According to a study conducted by the Railway Technology Strategy Center at Imperial College London, and data gathered by Nova/CoMET, the Taipei Metro has ranked number 1 in the world for four consecutive years in terms of reliability, safety, and quality standards (2004–2007). The most congested route sections handle over 38,000 commuters per hour during peak times.

On New Year's Eve 2009 and New Year's Day 2010, the Metro system transported 2.17 million passengers in 42 consecutive hours. On 22 April 2010 after 14 years of service, the system achieved the milestone of 4 billion cumulative riders. On 29 December 2010, the system passed the benchmark of 500 million annual passengers for the first time. The record for single day ridership hit 2.5 million passengers during the New Year's Eve celebrations on 31 December 2010. Following opening of the Xinyi section of Tamsui–Xinyi Line, the system reached another record of 2.75 million passengers on 31 December 2013.

In May 2016, the Singapore Transport Minister, Khaw Boon Wan, said that his country's rail operators, SBS Transit and SMRT, should emulate the example of Taipei Metro. Speaking at a rail engineering forum, he cited the Taipei Metro's timely maintenance and replacement of assets, as well as its fast response to rail network problems. Khaw said the Singapore Land Transport Authority (LTA) is working with the TRTC to attach staff from SBS and SMRT to its metro workshops, so they can learn from its asset maintenance practices and engineering improvements.

== Future expansions ==
Taipei Rail Map showing current lines, lines under construction, and planned lines. Other rail systems are also shown.

Several lines and extensions will expand the Taipei Metro system.

=== Phases 2 and 3 of the Circular line ===
Phase 2 of the Circular line is under construction and planned to be completed in June 2031. Phase 2 consists of a northern and southern section. The northern section will continue from New Taipei Industrial Park to Jiannan Road. This section will service Wugu, Luzhou, Sanchong, Shilin, and Neihu. The southern section will continue from Dapinglin to Taipei Zoo and will mainly service Wenshan. A year before completion of Phase 2 of the Circular line, the Circular line will be handed back to Taipei Metro from New Taipei Metro.

Phase 3 has begun construction in 2025 and is expected to finish in 2032. Phase 3 consists of the eastern section, which will connect Jiannan Road and Taipei Zoo in Phase 2, making the line a complete loop.

=== Wanda–Zhonghe–Shulin line (Light Green line) ===
Wanda–Zhonghe–Shulin is a metro line under construction. Phase 1 will run from CKS Memorial Hall to Juguang, Zhonghe, New Taipei. Phase 1 is expected to be completed in 2027.

Phase 2 will connect Zhonghe Senior High School, the previous station of Juguang, to Huilong, making the part between Zhonghe Senior High School and Juguang a branch line. The entire line is expected to be fully completed in 2033.

=== Minsheng–Xizhi line (Sky Blue line) ===
The Minsheng–Xizhi line is a planned metro line. As of February 2011, New Taipei was pursuing the construction of the 17.52-km Minsheng–Xizhi line, though the most recent plan was rejected by the Ministry of Transportation and Communications, citing the need for further evidence for the line's viability. The city plans to re-submit the proposal, and the project is estimated to cost NT$42.2 billion (US$1.44 billion). A possible 4.25-km extension of the line to connect with the planned Keelung Light Rail is also being considered. The line is planned to be built partially underground and partially elevated. It will begin from Dadaocheng Harbour beneath Minsheng West Road in Taipei, run along Minsheng East and West Roads, pass through Minsheng Community and journey under the Keelung River towards the Neihu District. The line will then change to an elevated mode and reach its termini at Xintai 5th Road in Xizhi District, New Taipei City. As of May 2018, the proposal for this line had been submitted to the Ministry of Transportation and Communications, but has yet to be approved.

In 2020, it was decided that the eastern section of the line would be built first from Donghu to Xizhi District Office under the purview of New Taipei Metro, now called the Xizhi-Donghu line. It would interline with the Keelung Metro (upgraded from light rail to a medium-capacity metro) and share a depot at Shehou. In 2023, it received final approval from the Executive Yuan, and broke ground on 20 March 2025, with expected completion in 2032.

=== Proposed lines ===
Note: these lines are likely subject to change as they are still in the initial stages of planning.

==== Zhonghe-Guangfu line ====
The proposed 8-kilometre (5 mi) medium-capacity line would start at Xiulang Bridge and terminate at Sun Yat-sen Memorial Hall station, providing rapid transit access to the eastern portion of Yonghe District, and relieving traffic on existing bridges across the Xindian River. It would also connect to five existing metro lines, serve NTU at Gongguan station and provide a second metro line to the Taipei Dome. Most of the route replicates a former proposal known as the North-South line, that eventually evolved into the eastern section of the Circular line. It is currently unknown whether this line will be operated and constructed by Taipei Metro or New Taipei Metro, as 3.1 km (1.9 mi) of the route is situated within the boundaries of New Taipei City, and the remainder within Taipei City, with the feasibility study of the New Taipei section expected to release in the second half of 2026.

== Incidents ==
=== 2001 typhoon flooding ===
On 17 September 2001, Typhoon Nari flooded all underground tracks as well as 16 stations, the heavy-capacity system operation control center, the administration building, and the Nangang Depot. The elevated Wenhu Line was not seriously affected and resumed operations the next day. However, the heavy-capacity lines were not restored to full operational status until three months later.

=== 2014 stabbing attack ===
On 21 May 2014, 28 people were stabbed in a mass stabbing by a knife-wielding college student on the Bannan Line. The attack occurred on a train near Jiangzicui, resulting in 4 deaths and 24 injured. It was the first fatal attack on the metro system since it began operations in 1996. The suspect was 21-year-old Cheng Chieh (鄭捷), a university student at Tunghai University, who was arrested at Jiangzicui immediately after the incident. On 6 March 2015, Cheng Chieh was found guilty on multiple counts of murder and attempted murder, and was sentenced to death. He was subsequently executed on 10 May 2016.

=== 2025 stabbing attack ===
On 19 December 2025, an attacker killed three people and injured five in Taipei Main Station and Zhongshan metro station with a machete. He also released smoke bombs, and died later in a police chase where he fell from a building. Besides smoke grenades, the man likely possessed items such as petrol bombs that appeared to have burned at the ‍scene and he was also wearing what appeared to be body armour and a mask.

== Controversies ==
In early 2021, it was discovered that a pornographic film production company had created a series of sets which copied the design of MRT trains and stations. This caused a brief stir when it was first released as many were concerned that the films had been shot on actual MRT trains and stations. Nevertheless, it was still condemned by Taipei MRT for imitating its train carriages.

On 30 December 2021, Taipei MRT rejected an Amnesty International advertisement which featured detained human rights activist Lee Ming-che.

== See also ==
- Maokong Gondola
- Rail transport in Taiwan
- Lists of rapid transit systems
- List of metro systems
