= Community of Metros =

The Community of Metros Benchmarking Group (COMET), formerly CoMET and Nova groups, is a multinational collection of metro systems focusing on international benchmarking, facilitated by the Transport Strategy Centre (TSC) at Imperial College London. The Community of Metros consist of 47 metro systems in 44 cities around the world. The groups are jointly owned and steered by the various members.

== History ==
In 1994, London Underground and four other metro systems formed a small group to share performance data with each other. In 1996, the Community of Metros (CoMET) group was formed with 8 metro systems, to allow benchmarking between them.

== COMET benchmarking ==
The four main objectives of the metro benchmarking groups are:

1. To share knowledge and identify best practices in a confidential environment
2. To support members in achieving their operational and strategic goals – focusing on improvements
3. To build systems of measures for use by management and to establish public transport best practices
4. To prioritise areas for improvement and support decision-making for management, boards, government, and other stakeholders

The key performance indicator (KPI) system is used by the COMET during the benchmarking process in order to compare performance across the member metro systems. The purpose of benchmarking is to search for best practices that lead to superior performance. There are approximately 30 top-level indicators, which are designed to measure the overall performance of the organisation in six distinct areas:

- Growth, learning, and innovation
- Financial
- Customer
- Internal processes
- Safety and security
- Environment

The indicators are reviewed by members on an annual basis. The group members operate under a full confidentiality agreement. This allows for full data and information exchange within the COMET but not externally.

Statistical analyses are used to provide greater understanding of the results, while time series analyses allow for trends in performance to be identified. This helps to highlight which members are changing their practices and what improvements are relatively achievable. Where clear differences or improvements in performance are identified, detailed analysis is carried out through case studies. Multiple case studies are conducted in the COMET each year; these studies include detailed data analysis, questionnaires, and interviews with functional experts. Case studies are further supported by expert workshops where appropriate. In many cases, best practices may be found outside the metro industry, so other public transport operations and even other industries are reviewed for relevant practices.

== Membership ==
As of August 2025 the Community of Metros consisted of 47 metro systems located in 44 cities around the world.

=== Americas ===
- (United States) MARTA, since 21 April 2023
- (Argentina) Buenos Aires Underground
- (United States) Honolulu Skyline, since 28 May 2022
- Mexico City Metro
- (Canada) Montreal Metro
- (United States) New York City Subway
- (United States) PATH, since 7 April 2022
- (Chile) Santiago Metro
- (Brazil) São Paulo Metro
- (Canada) OC Transpo, since 15 May 2019
- (Brazil) Metro Rio
- (United States) San Francisco BART, since 18 January 2018
- (Canada) Toronto Subway
- (United States) Washington Metro, since 2 January 2018
- (Canada) Vancouver Skytrain, since 30 September 2016

=== Asia and Oceania ===
- (India) Bangalore Namma Metro, since 24 February 2020
- (Thailand) Bangkok MRT
- (China) Beijing Subway
- (China) Chengdu Metro, since 1 March 2025
- (India) Chennai Metro, since 25 October 2024
- (China) Chongqing Rail Transit, since 1 March 2025
- (India) Delhi Metro
- (United Arab Emirates) Dubai Metro
- (China) Guangzhou Metro
- Hong Kong MTR
- (Indonesia) Jakarta MRT, since 30 September 2021
- (Malaysia) Kuala Lumpur RapidKL Rail, since 4 November 2013
- (China) Nanjing Metro, since 4 October 2013
- (South Korea) Seoul Metro, since 1 September 2013
- (China) Shanghai Metro
- (China) Shenzhen Metro, since 10 July 2015
- Singapore MRT
- (Australia) Sydney Metro, since 29 December 2019
- (Taiwan) Taipei Metro
- (Japan) Tokyo Metro, since 20 January 2020

=== Europe ===
- (Spain) Barcelona Metro
- (Germany) Berlin U-Bahn
- (Belgium) Brussels Metro
- (Turkey) Istanbul Metro, since 20 February 2014
- (Portugal) Lisbon Metro
- (United Kingdom) London DLR, since 4 December 2013
- (United Kingdom) London Underground
- (Spain) Madrid Metro
- (United Kingdom) Newcastle Tyne & Wear Metro
- (Norway) Oslo Metro, since 23 September 2014
- (France) Paris Metro and the RER

=== Former members ===
- (Russia) Moscow Metro (membership ceased in March 2022 due to military invasion)
- (Australia) Sydney Trains (joined International Suburban Rail Benchmarking Group (ISBeRG) in 2011, and terminated its parallel CoMET membership in 2024)

== Major publications ==
Some of the major publication journals by COMET include:

- Canavan S, Barron A, Cohen J, Graham DJ, Anderson RJ et al. (2019). Best Practices in Operating High Frequency Metro Services, Transportation Research Record.
- Anupriya A, Graham D, Anderson R, Carbo JM et al. (2018). Cost Function for Urban Rail Transport Systems, Transportation Research Board 98th Annual Meeting.
- Canavan, S., Graham, D.J., Anderson, R.J., Barron, A. (2017). Urban Metro Rail Demand: Evidence from Dynamic Generalised Method of Moments (GMM) Estimates using Panel Data.
- Hörcher, D., Graham, D. J., and Anderson, R. J. (2017). Crowding cost estimation with large scale smart card and vehicle location data. TRANSPORTATION RESEARCH PART B: METHODOLOGICAL, 95, 105–125.
- Singh, R., Graham, D.J., Anderson, R. (2017) Characterising journey time performance on urban metro systems. TransitData conference, Santiago, Chile, 22 May 2017.
- Hörcher, D., Graham, D.J., Anderson, R., (2017) Crowding cost estimation with large scale smart card and vehicle location data, Transportation Research Part B: Methodological, pp. 105–125.
- Brage-Ardao, R., Graham, D.J., Anderson, R.J., Barron, A. (2017). Metro Operating Costs: Main Patterns and Determinants. Transportation Research Board 96th Annual Meeting.
