= LG2 =

LG2 or variation, may refer to:

- La Grande-2 generating station (LG-2), Quebec, Canada
- Lehrgeschwader 2 (LG 2; German: Demonstration Wing 2), German WWII Luftwaffe air wing
- Lechia II Gdańsk (LG2) soccer team
- Gibson LG-2 acoustic guitar, see Gibson L Series
- Buick LG2, a Buick V6 engine
- binary logarithm (lg_{2})
- Laminin G domain 2 (LG2)
- Lg2, a virulent strain of the fish pathogen Lactococcus garvieae
- Second late glacial (LG2), a period of the Older Dryas ice age
- Lower Group 2, of the Bushveld Igneous Complex
- Taipei Botanical Garden metro station (station code LG02) on the Wanda–Zhonghe–Shulin line in Taipei, Taiwan
- Alūksne district (LG02), Latvia; see List of FIPS region codes (J–L)

== See also ==
- 2LG
- LG (disambiguation)
- LGG (disambiguation)
- IG2
