= LG4 =

LG4 or variation, may refer to:

- La Grande-4 generating station (LG-4), Quebec, Canada
- Chevrolet LG4, a Chevrolet small-block engine
- Laminin G domain 4 (LG4)
- Lower Group 4, of the Bushveld Igneous Complex
- Kalah metro station (station code LG04) on the Wanda–Zhonghe–Shulin line in Taipei, Taiwan
- Bauskas District (LG04), Latvia; see List of FIPS region codes (J–L)

== See also ==
- LG (disambiguation)
- 4LG
- IG4
- 1g4
- 1.g4
