= LG3 =

LG3 or variation, may refer to:

- La Grande-3 generating station (LG-3), Quebec, Canada
- Lehrgeschwader 3 (LG 3; German: Learning Wing 3), WWII German Luftwaffe air wing; that became Gruppe II of Kampfgeschwader 1
- Gibson LG-3 acoustic guitar, see Gibson L Series
- Chevrolet LG3, a Chevrolet small-block engine
- Buick LG3, a Buick V6 engine
- Laminin G domain 3 (LG3)
- Lower Group 3, of the Bushveld Igneous Complex
- Xiaan metro station (station code LG03) on the Wanda–Zhonghe–Shulin line in Taipei, Taiwan
- Balvi district (LG03), Latvia; see List of FIPS region codes (J–L)

== See also ==
- LG (disambiguation)
- IG3
- 1G3
