= LG8 =

LG8 may refer to:

- GM LG8 engine
- Oldsmobile LG8, an Oldsmobile V8 engine
- Zhonghe Senior High School metro station (station code LG08) on the Wanda–Zhonghe–Shulin line in New Taipei, Taiwan
- Dobele district (LG08), Latvia; see List of FIPS region codes (J–L)

== See also ==
- LG (disambiguation)
- LGB (disambiguation)
