= LG7 =

LG7 or variation, may refer to:

- Buick LG7, a Buick V6 engine
- Lower Group 7, of the Bushveld Igneous Complex
- Liancheng Jinhe metro station (station code LG07) on the Wanda–Zhonghe–Shulin line in New Taipei, Taiwan
- Daugavpils district (LG07), Latvia; see List of FIPS region codes (J–L)
- Mayhem, 2025 studio album by Lady Gaga, commonly referred to as "LG7" prior to the reveal of its title

== See also ==
- LG (disambiguation)
