= Lg1 =

lg1 or variation, may refer to:

- La Grande-1 generating station (LG-1), Quebec, Canada
- Lehrgeschwader 1 (LG 1; German: Training Wing 1), WWII German Luftwaffe air wing
- GIAT LG1, 105 mm towed howitzer
- Gibson LG-1 acoustic guitar, see Gibson L Series
- First late glacial (LG1), a period of the Older Dryas ice age
- Laminin G domain 1 (LG1)
- Lower Group 1, of the Bushveld Igneous Complex
- Chiang Kai-shek Memorial Hall metro station (station code LG01) on the Tamsui–Xinyi line, Songshan–Xindian line, and Wanda–Zhonghe–Shulin line in Taipei, Taiwan
- Aizkraukle district (LG01), Latvia; see List of FIPS region codes (J–L)

== See also ==
- LG (disambiguation)
- LGI (disambiguation)
