= Zhonghe metro station =

Metro station on the Taipei Metro's Circular line

Zhonghe / LG06 中和
- Exterior of Zhonghe Station

Chinese name
- Chinese: 中和
Transcriptions
Standard Mandarin
- Hanyu Pinyin: Zhōnghé
- Bopomofo: ㄓㄨㄥ ㄏㄜˊ
- Wade–Giles: Chung¹-hê²
Hakka
- Pha̍k-fa-sṳ: Chûng-fò
Southern Min
- Tâi-lô: Tiong-hô

General information
- Location: No. 271, Sec. 2, Zhongshan Rd. Zhonghe, New Taipei; Taiwan
- Coordinates: 25.0024°N 121.4962°E
- Operator: New Taipei Metro
- Line: Circular line (Y12)
- Connections: Bus stop

Construction
- Structure type: Elevated

Other information
- Station code: / LG06

History
- Opened: 31 January 2020

Services
Preceding station	New Taipei Metro	Following station
Jingan towards Dapinglin	Circular line	Qiaohe towards NT Industrial Park
Future services
Preceding station	Taipei Metro	Following station
Yonghe Yongping Elementary School towards Chiang Kai-Shek Memorial Hall	Wanda–Shulin line	Liancheng Jinhe towards Huilong or Juguang
Location

Zhonghe station (Chinese: 中和站) is a metro station on the Taipei Metro's Circular line. It opened on 31 January 2020. It is located in Zhonghe District, New Taipei, Taiwan, at the intersection of Zhongshan Road and Jingping Road. It will become a transfer station with Wanda–Zhonghe–Shulin line in 2027.

== Station layout ==
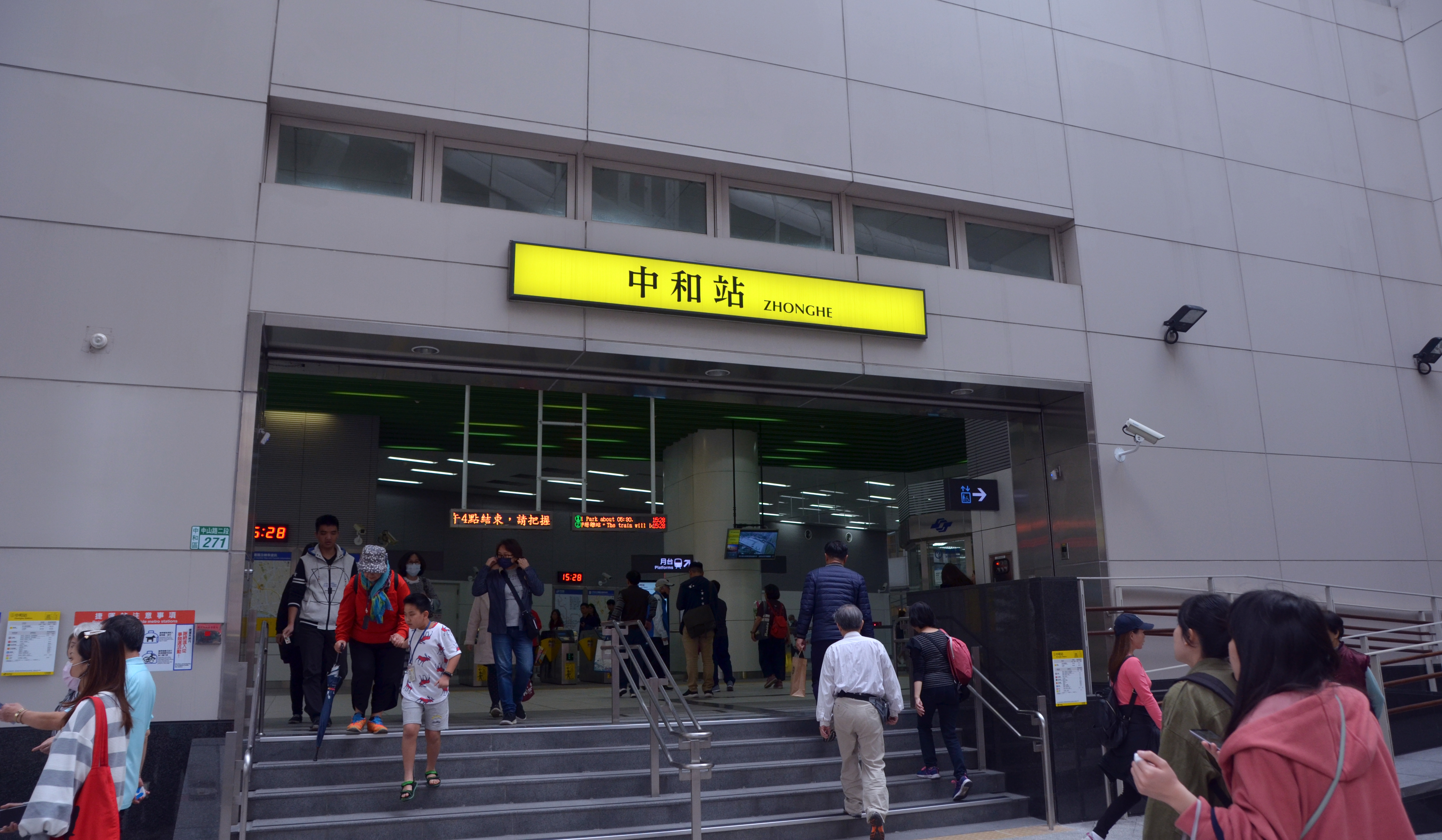
Exit of Zhonghe Station

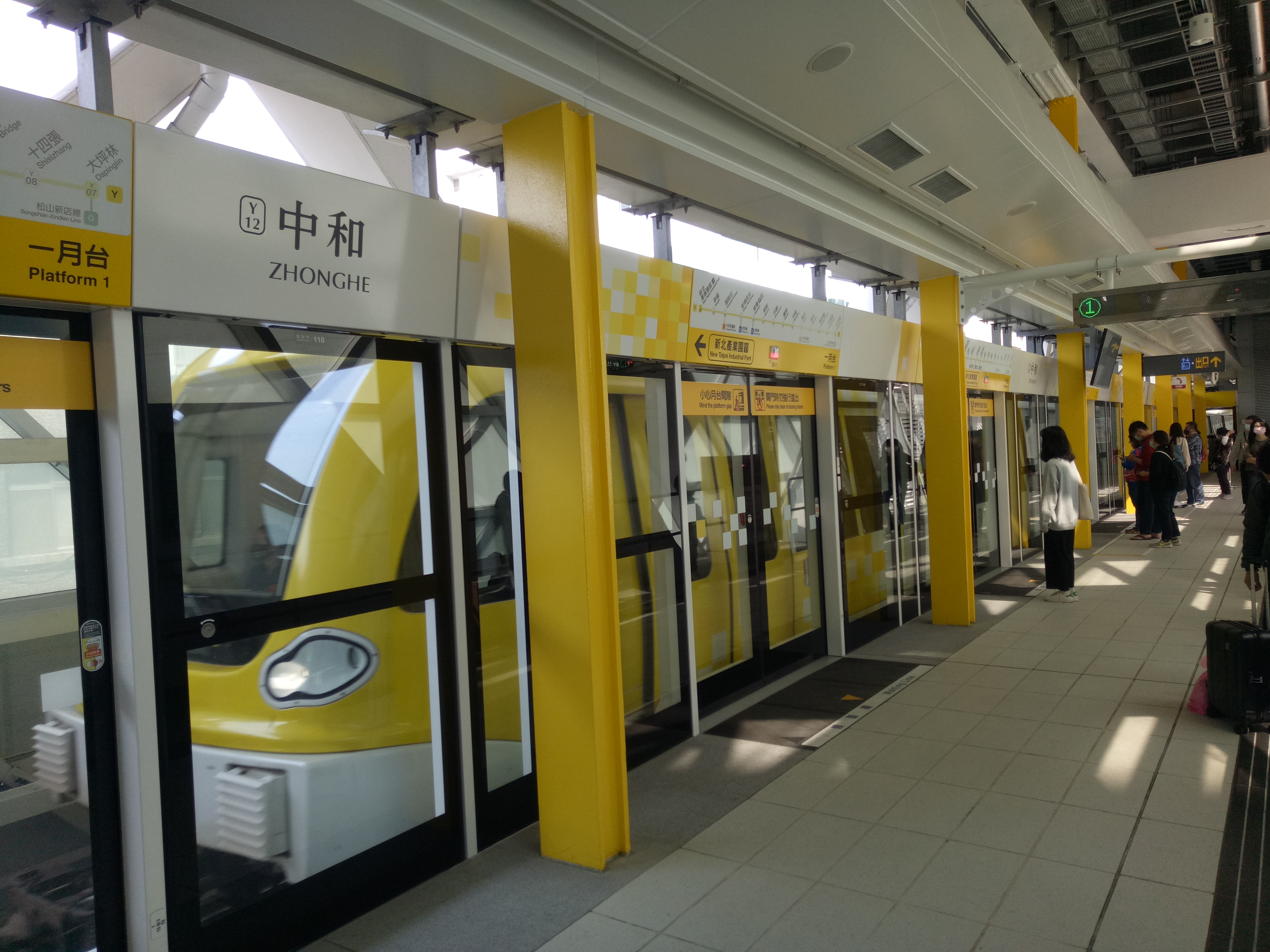
Platform 1

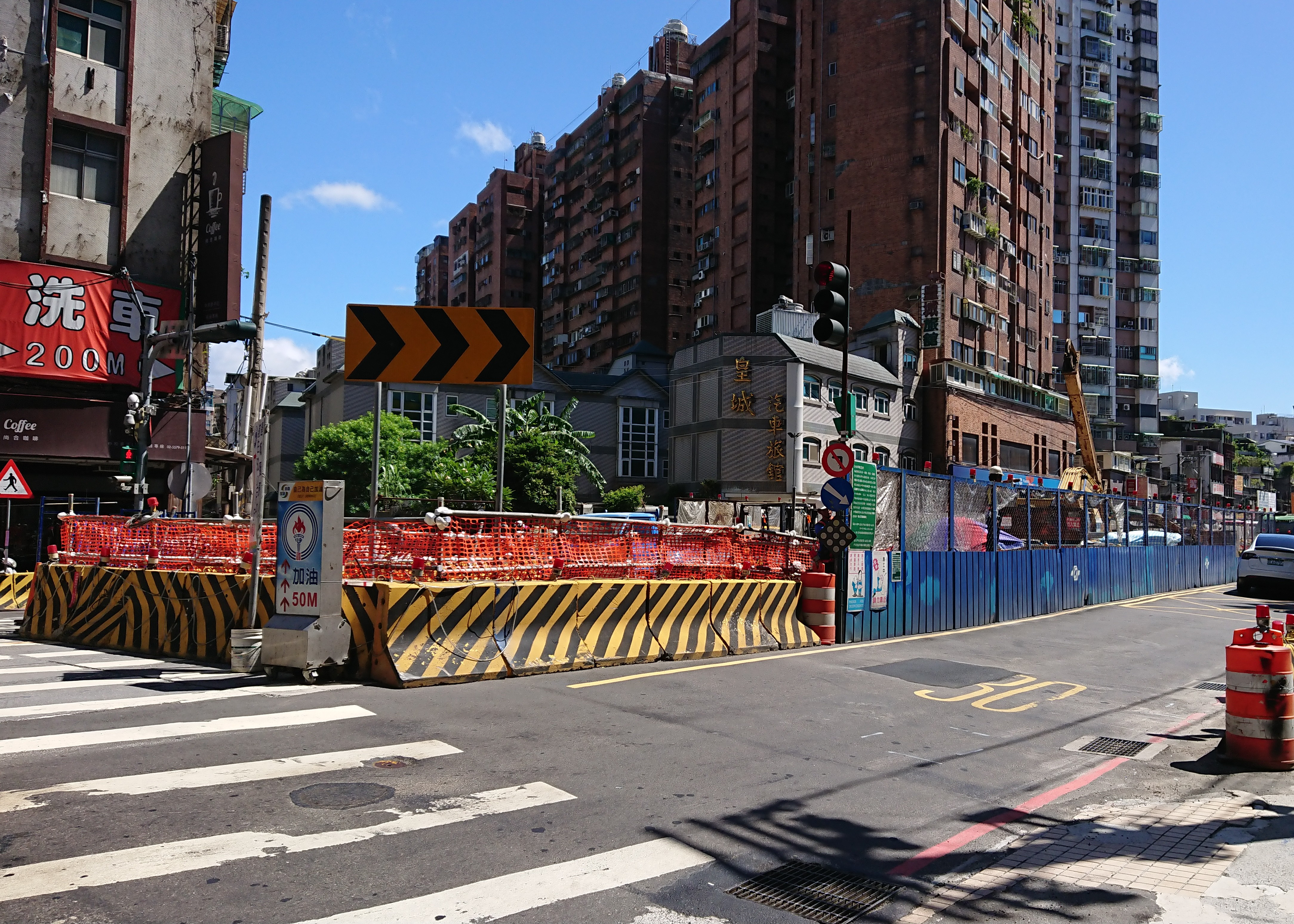
Under-construction Wanda–Zhonghe–Shulin line

5F	Platform 2	Circular line toward Dapinglin (Y11 Jingan) →
5F	Side platform, doors will open on the right
3F	Platform 1	Circular line toward New Taipei Industrial Park (Y13 Qiaohe) ←
3F	Side platform, doors will open on the left
Street level	Circular line Concourse	Entrance/exit, lobby, information desk, automatic ticket dispensing machines, one-way faregates
B1	Wanda–Zhonghe–Shulin line Concourse	Lobby, information desk, automatic ticketing dispensing machines, one-way faregates (under construction)
B1	Wanda–Zhonghe–Shulin line Concourse	Restrooms (under construction)
B2	Side platform, under construction
B2	Platform 1	Wanda-Zhonghe-Shulin line toward Chiang Kai-shek Memorial Hall (LG05 Yonghe Yongping Elementary School)→
B4	Side platform, under construction
B4	Platform 2	← Wanda-Zhonghe-Shulin line toward Juguang (LG07 Liancheng Jinhe)

== Exits ==
- Exit 1: Southwest side of the intersection of Sec. 2, Zhongshan Rd. and Jingping Rd.
- Exit 2: Under construction
- Exit 3: Under construction

== Around the station ==
- Huazhong Bridge (300m north of the station)
- Nan Shan Power Center (next to the station)
- Gonglu 2nd. Village Park (550m southwest of the station)
- Dinosaur Park (650m north of the station)
- An Bang Park (700m south of the station)
- Biheli Park (750m southwest of the station)
- Zhonghe District Office (700m southeast of the station)
- Zhonghe District Comprehensive Sports Ground (750m southeast of the station)
- Zhonghe Elementary School (650m southeast of the station)
- Guangji Temple (600m southeast of the station)
- Nanshan High School (800m east of the station)
