= LG9 =

LG9 or variation, may refer to:

- Diamond Creek (LG9), Grand Canyon Backcountry Camping
- Tingliao MRT Station (station code LG09) on the Wanda–Zhonghe–Shulin line, Taipei, Taiwan
- Gulbene district (LG09), Latvia; see List of FIPS region codes (J–L)

== See also ==
- LG (disambiguation)
