= Yonghe Yongping Elementary School metro station =

Wanda-Zhonghe-Shulin Line's under-construction MRT Station

Yonghe Yongping Elementary School LG05 永和永平國小

Chinese name
- Traditional Chinese: 永和永平國小
- Simplified Chinese: 永和永平国小
Transcriptions
Standard Mandarin
- Hanyu Pinyin: Yǒnghéyǒngpíngguóxiǎo
- Bopomofo: ㄩㄥˇㄏㄜˊㄩㄥˇㄆㄧㄥˊㄍㄨㄛˊㄒㄧㄠˇ

General information
- Location: Yonghe, New Taipei; Taiwan
- Coordinates: 25.00874°N 121.50526°E
- Operated by: Taipei Metro
- Line: Wanda–Zhonghe–Shulin line (LG05)

Construction
- Structure type: Underground

Other information
- Station code: LG05

History
- Opening: December 2025 (expected)

Services
Preceding station	Taipei Metro	Following station
Kalah towards Chiang Kai-shek Memorial Hall	Wanda–Shulin line Future Service	Zhonghe towards Juguang
Kalah towards Chiang Kai-shek Memorial Hall	Wanda–Shulin line Future Service, after Phase 2	Zhonghe towards Huilong
Location

Yonghe Yongping Elementary School is an under-construction metro station on the Wanda–Zhonghe–Shulin line located in the western part of Yonghe, New Taipei, Taiwan. It is scheduled to open in June of 2027.

== Station overview ==
This will be a three-level, underground station with an island platform. The station's design will be based on the integration and expansion of green environments in schools. An underground botanical garden will be introduced in this station as well.

Originally, the name of this station was planned to be "Yonghe Station." However, after considering that this station is still quite a distance from Central Yonghe, it was decided that the name should be changed to Yonghe Yongping Elementary School. The station name originates from Yonghe, the name of the district, and the nearby Yongping Elementary School.

== Station layout ==
1F	Street level	Entrance/exit
B1	Mezzanine level
B2	Concourse	Lobby, information desk, automatic ticketing dispensing machines, one-way faregates (under construction); Restrooms (under construction)
B3	Platform 1	Wanda-Zhonghe-Shulin line toward Chiang Kai-shek Memorial Hall (LG18 Kalah)
B3	Island platform, under construction
B3	Platform 2	Wanda-Zhonghe-Shulin line toward Juguang (LG16 Zhonghe)

== Around the station ==
- Yongping Elementary School
- Renai Park
- Museum of World Religions
