= Kalah metro station =

Wanda-Zhonghe-Shulin Line's under-construction MRT Station

Kalah LG04 加蚋

Chinese name
- Traditional Chinese: 加蚋
- Simplified Chinese: 加蚋
Transcriptions
Standard Mandarin
- Hanyu Pinyin: Jiālà
- Bopomofo: ㄐㄧㄚㄌㄚˋ

General information
- Location: Wanhua, Taipei; Taiwan
- Coordinates: 25.0214597°N 121.4986533°E
- Operated by: Taipei Metro
- Line: Wanda–Zhonghe–Shulin line (LG04)

Construction
- Structure type: Underground

Other information
- Station code: LG04

History
- Opening: December 2025 (expected)

Services
| Preceding station | Taipei Metro | Following station |
|---|---|---|
| Xiaan towards Chiang Kai-shek Memorial Hall | Wanda–Shulin line under construction | Yonghe Yongping Elementary School towards Juguang |
Location

Kalah (MetroMan calls it Jiala) is an under-construction metro station on the Wanda–Zhonghe–Shulin line located in Wanhua, Taipei, Taiwan. It was scheduled to open at the end of 2025.

== Station overview ==
This will be a three-level, underground station with an island platform. The design theme of the station will be based on "Colorful MRT Rhythm - Fruit and Vegetable Rhapsody", which originates from the observation findings of the natural and cultural uniqueness of the station.

== Station layout ==
| 1F | Street level | Entrance/exit |
| B1 | Concourse | Lobby, information desk, automatic ticketing dispensing machines, one-way faregates (under construction); Restrooms (under construction) |
| B3 | Platform 1 | Wanda-Zhonghe-Shulin line toward Chiang Kai-shek Memorial Hall (LG19 Xiaan) |
| B3 | Island platform, under construction |
| B3 | Platform 2 | Wanda-Zhonghe-Shulin line toward Juguang (LG17 Yonghe Yongping Elementary School) |

== Around the station ==
- Taipei Municipal Wanda Elementary School
- Taipei Municipal Dongyuan Elementary School
- Taipei First Fruit & Vegetable Wholesale Market
