= LGI (disambiguation) =

LGI or lgi may refer to:

- LGI Mle F1, a French grenade launcher
- Leeds General Infirmary, England, a hospital
- Lengilu language (ISO code: lgi), a language of Borneo
- LGI Homes, United States, a construction company
- Lion Global Investors, a subsidiary of OCBC Bank
- Late Glacial Interstadial (c. 14,670 BP to c. 12,890 BP)
- Deadman's Cay Airport (IATA code: LGI), Long Island, Bahamas

== See also ==
- Lg1 (disambiguation)
