= Liancheng Jinhe metro station =

Wanda-Zhonghe-Shulin Line's under-construction MRT Station

Liancheng Jinhe LG07 連城錦和

Chinese name
- Traditional Chinese: 連城錦和
- Simplified Chinese: 连城锦和
Transcriptions
Standard Mandarin
- Hanyu Pinyin: Liánchéngjǐnhé
- Bopomofo: ㄌㄧㄢˊㄔㄥˊㄐㄧㄣˇㄏㄜˊ

General information
- Location: Zhonghe, New Taipei; Taiwan
- Coordinates: 24.996303°N 121.489924°E
- Operator: Taipei Metro
- Line: Wanda–Zhonghe–Shulin line (LG07)

Construction
- Structure type: Underground

Other information
- Station code: LG07

History
- Opening: June 2027 (expected)

Services
Preceding station	Taipei Metro	Following station
Zhonghe towards Chiang Kai-shek Memorial Hall	Wanda–Shulin line under construction	Zhonghe Senior High School towards Juguang
Location

Liancheng Jinhe is an under-construction metro station on the Wanda–Zhonghe–Shulin line located in Zhonghe, New Taipei, Taiwan. It is expected to open in June 2027.

== Station overview ==
This will be a two-level, underground station with an island platform. The station will demonstrate the power of industrial transformation based on the "industrial movement."

Originally, the name of this station was planned to be "Shuang-Ho Hospital Station." However, after considering that this station is 600 meters from Shuang-Ho Hospital, it was decided that the name of the station be changed to Liancheng Jinhe. The name originates from the location of the station, at Liancheng Jinhe Intersection.

== Station layout ==
1F	Street level	Entrance/exit
B1	Concourse	Lobby, information desk, automatic ticketing dispensing machines, one-way faregates (under construction); Restrooms (under construction)
B2	Platform 1	Wanda-Zhonghe-Shulin line toward Chiang Kai-shek Memorial Hall (LG06 Zhonghe)
B2	Island platform, under construction
B2	Platform 2	Wanda-Zhonghe-Shulin line toward Juguang (LG08 Zhonghe Senior High School)
