= Xiaan metro station =

Wanda-Zhonghe-Shulin Line's under-construction MRT Station

Xiaan 廈安

Chinese name
- Traditional Chinese: 廈安
- Simplified Chinese: 厦安
Transcriptions
Standard Mandarin
- Hanyu Pinyin: Xià'ān
- Bopomofo: ㄒㄧㄚˋㄢ

General information
- Location: Zhongzheng, Taipei; Taiwan
- Coordinates: 25.03014252°N 121.50456466°E
- Operator: Taipei Rapid Transit Corporation
- Line: Wanda–Shulin Line
- Platforms: 1 (Island)

Construction
- Structure type: Underground
- Accessible: Yes

Other information
- Station code: LG03

History
- Opening: December 2025 (expected)

Services
Preceding station	Taipei Metro	Following station
Taipei Botanical Garden towards Chiang Kai-shek Memorial Hall	Wanda–Shulin Line under construction	Kalah towards Juguang
Location

Xiaan station (Chinese: 廈安站) is an under-construction metro station on the Wanda–Zhonghe–Shulin line located in Zhongzheng, Taipei, Taiwan. It was scheduled to open at the end of 2025.

== Station overview ==
This will be a two-level, underground station with an island platform. The theme of the station will be based on "Lohas Taipei", while the architectural design of the station is based on the creation of lightweight visual effects.

== Station layout ==
1F	Street level	Entrance/exit
B1	Concourse	Lobby, information desk, automatic ticketing dispensing machines, one-way faregates (under construction); Restrooms (under construction)
B2	Platform 1	Wanda-Zhonghe-Shulin line toward Chiang Kai-shek Memorial Hall (LG02 Taipei Botanical Garden)
B2	Island platform, under construction
B2	Platform 2	Wanda-Zhonghe-Shulin line toward Juguang (LG04 Kalah)

== Around the station ==
- Nanjichang Night Market
