= Nanmen Market =

Market in Da'an, Taipei, Taiwan

Nanmen Market 南門市場
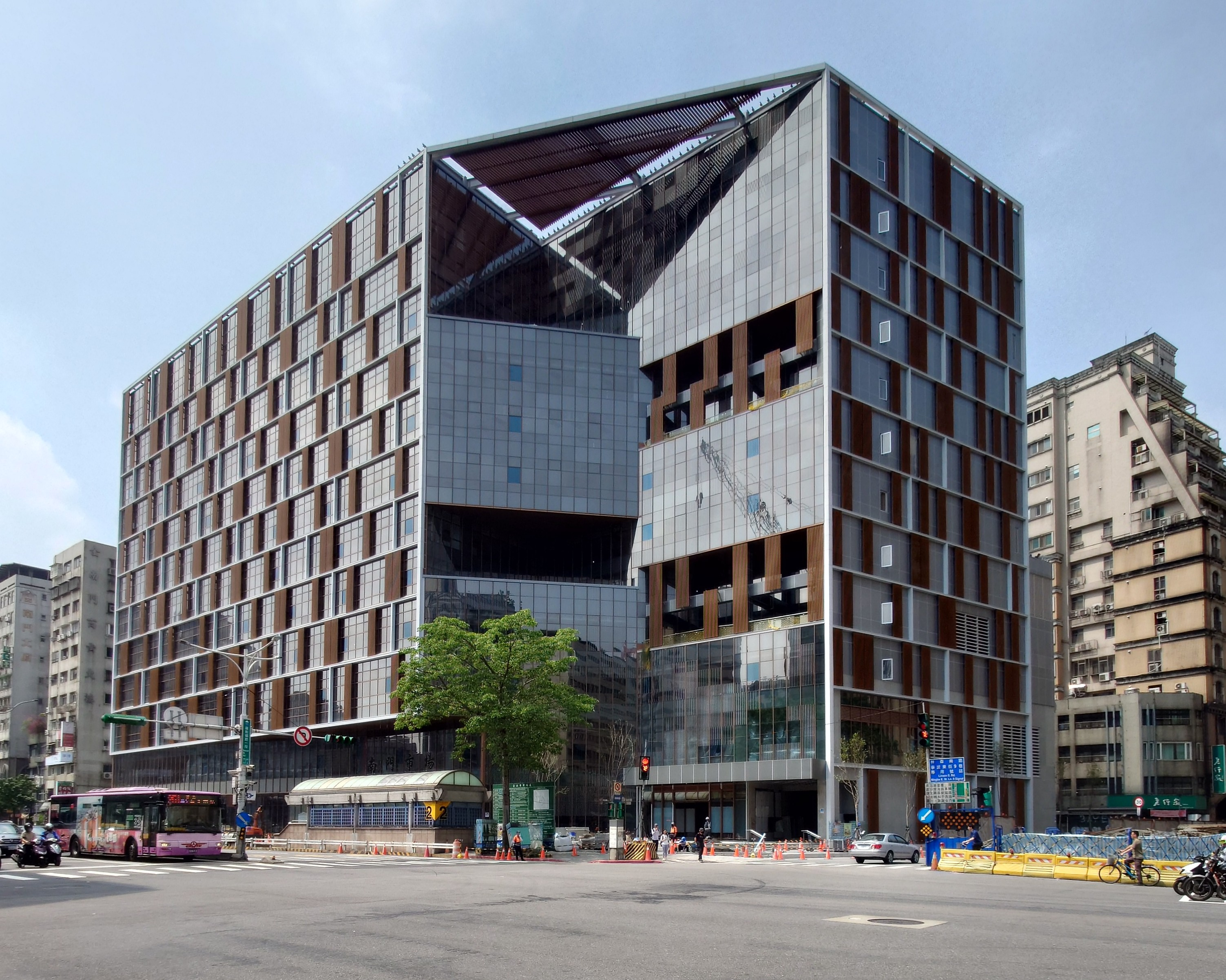
- Location: No. 8號, Section 1, Roosevelt Rd, Zhongzheng District, Taipei City, Taiwan 100; 25°01′56.6″N 121°31′04.9″E
- Opening date: 1907 (first building); 1981 (second building); 2019 (temporary building); 2023 (current building)
- Number of tenants: 254
- Website: Official website (in Chinese)
- Interactive map of Nanmen Market

The Nanmen Market (traditional Chinese: 南門市場; simplified Chinese: 南门市场; pinyin: Nánmén Shìchǎng) is a market in Da'an District, Taipei, Taiwan.

== History ==
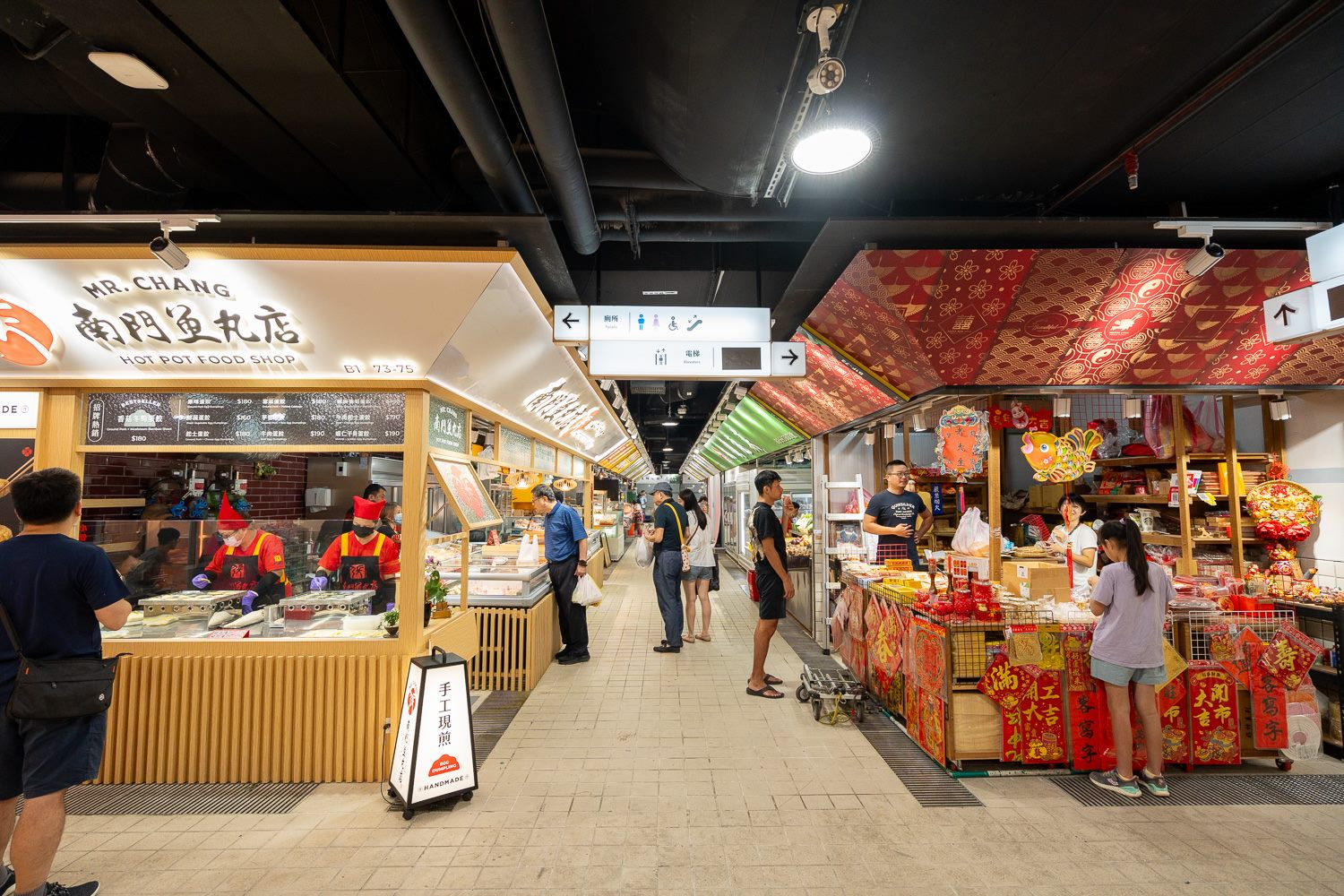
Nanmen Market

The market was originally established in 1907 during the Japanese rule as Chiensui Market. In 1946, after the handover of Taiwan from Japan to the Republic of China, the market was renamed Nanmen Market. In 1981, it moved to its current location at Roosevelt Road in an indoor building. In 2019, the market was closed for renovation works. Tenants were temporarily moved to a facility located in the nearby Hangzhou Road starting 13 November 2019. It will be closed on 30 September 2023. The newly constructed market building on the Roosevelt Road obtained its operating license on 30 May 2023. It will have its soft opening on 7 October 2023 and official opening in early November 2023.

== Architecture ==
The market is located on the lowest 4 floors of a 12-floor building. The remaining upper floors will be occupied by offices from the Taipei City Government. The market will have a total area of 7,452 m^{2} with average area for each stall about 10.5 m^{2}.

== Business ==
The market consists of 254 tenants.

== Transportation ==
The market is accessible from Chiang Kai-shek Memorial Hall Station of Taipei Metro.

== See also ==
- List of tourist attractions in Taiwan
