= Yonghe District =

District in New Taipei, Taiwan

Yonghe 永和區
- District
- Yonghe District
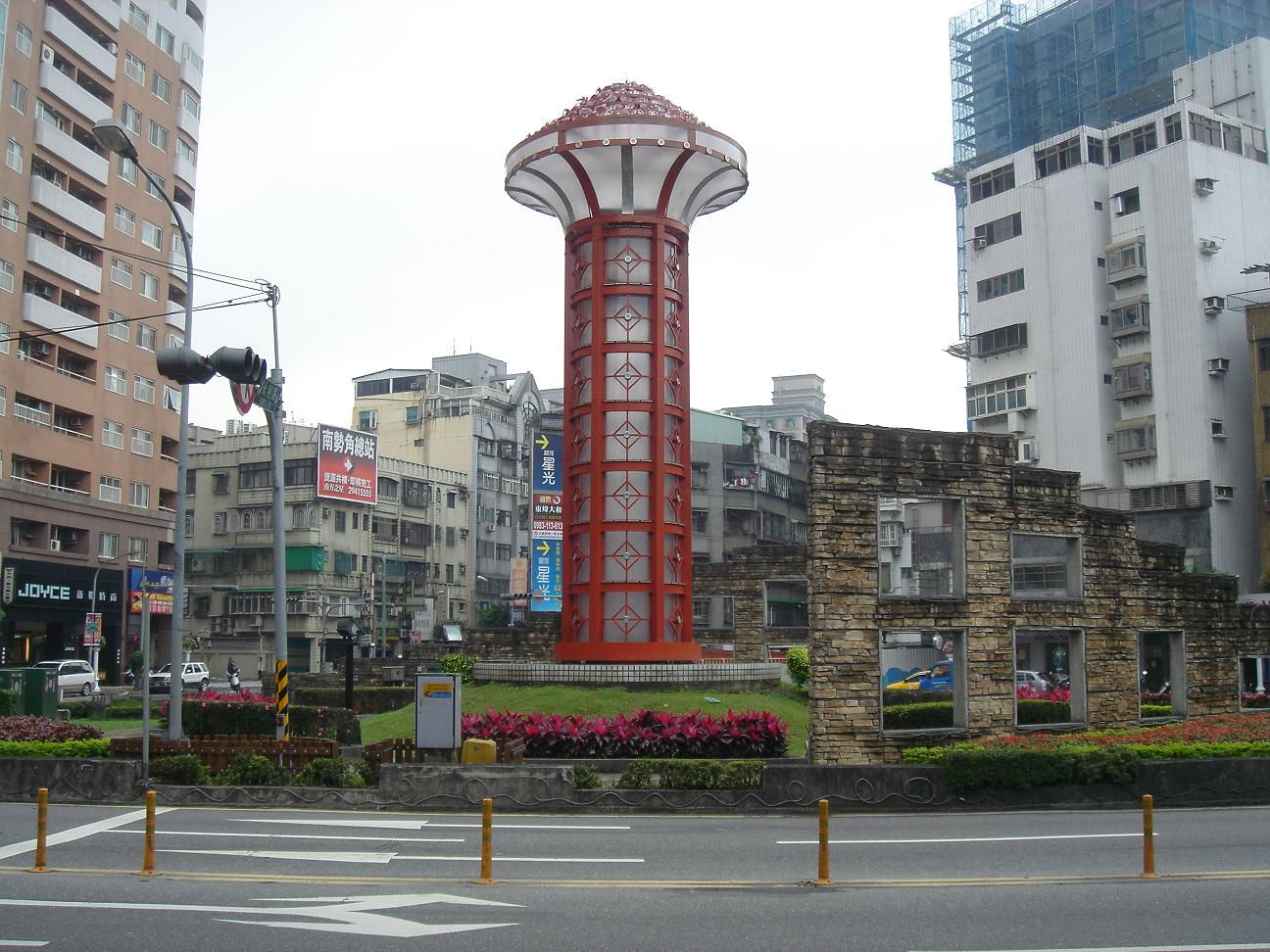

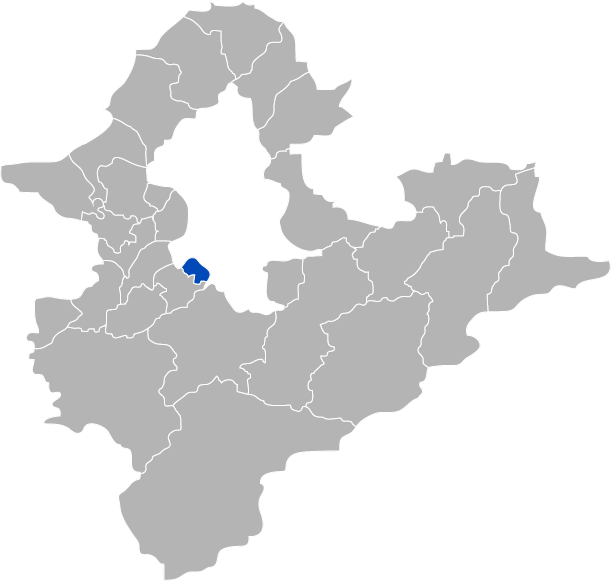
- Yonghe District in New Taipei City
- Coordinates: 25°00′27″N 121°30′59″E
- Country: Republic of China (Taiwan)
- Region: Northern Taiwan
- Special municipality: New Taipei City

Government
  - Mayor: Wu Xingbang (吳興邦)

Area
  - Total: 5.7138 km^{2} (2.2061 sq mi)

Population (February 2023)
  - Total: 213,227
- Time zone: UTC+8 (CST)
- Postal code: 234
- Website: www.yonghe.ntpc.gov.tw (in Chinese)

Yonghe District (Chinese: 永和區; pinyin: Yǒnghé Qū; Pe̍h-ōe-jī: Éng-hô-khu) is an urban area in the southern part of New Taipei, Taiwan. Yonghe District is the smallest district in New Taipei City. It is primarily a mixed residential and commercial area. With around 38,000 inhabitants per square kilometer as of 2019, Yonghe is one of the most densely populated urban areas in the world.

== History ==
On 1 January 1979, Yonghe was upgraded from an urban township to a county-administered city of Taipei County. With the changing of Taipei County to the special municipality of New Taipei City on 25 December 2010, Yonghe City was changed to Yonghe District.

== Geology ==
The Xindian River forms a natural boundary between Yonghe and Taipei City to the north and east, although three bridges connect the two areas. To the south and west lies Zhonghe District, which shares some administration and facilities with Yonghe.

== Notable products ==
The city is famous for its soy milk, and breakfast stores advertising "Yonghe Soy Milk" can be found all over Taiwan.

== Administrative divisions ==
The district comprises 62 villages: Anhe (安和), Bao'an (保安), Baoping (保平), Baoshun (保順), Datong (大同), Daxin (大新), Dehe (得和), Dianjie (店街), Dingxi (頂溪), Fuhe (福和), Fulin (福林), Fuxing (復興), Guangfu (光復), Guangming (光明), Guilin (桂林), Hebin (河濱), Heping (和平), Heti (河堤), Houxi (後溪), Lixing (勵行), Minben (民本), Minfu (民富), Minle (民樂), Minquan (民權), Minsheng (民生), Minzhi (民治), Minzu (民族), Qianxi (前溪), Ren'ai (仁愛), Shanglin (上林), Shangxi (上溪), Shuanghe (雙和), Shuiyuan (水源), Tan'an (潭安), Tanqian (潭墘), Wangxi (網溪), Wenhua (文化), Xiaxi (下溪), Xiehe (協和), Xinbu (新廍), Xinsheng (新生), Xinyi (信義), Xiucheng (秀成), Xiude (秀得), Xiuhe (秀和), Xiulang (秀朗), Xiulin (秀林), Xiuyuan (秀元), Yong'an (永安), Yongcheng (永成), Yongfu (永福), Yongle (永樂), Yongxing (永興), Yongyuan (永元), Yongzhen (永貞), Yüxi (豫溪), Zhengxing (正興), Zhiguang (智光), Zhongxi (中溪), Zhongxing (中興), Zhongyi (忠義), Zhulin (竹林).

== Government agencies ==
- Nuclear Safety Commission

== Tourist attractions ==
- Lehua Night Market
- Museum of World Religions
- Weiming Temple /Hall of Martial Brilliance
- Baofu Temple
- Boai Arts Street
- Renai Park
- Yonghe Community University Wetland Ecology Experimental Farm

== Transportation ==
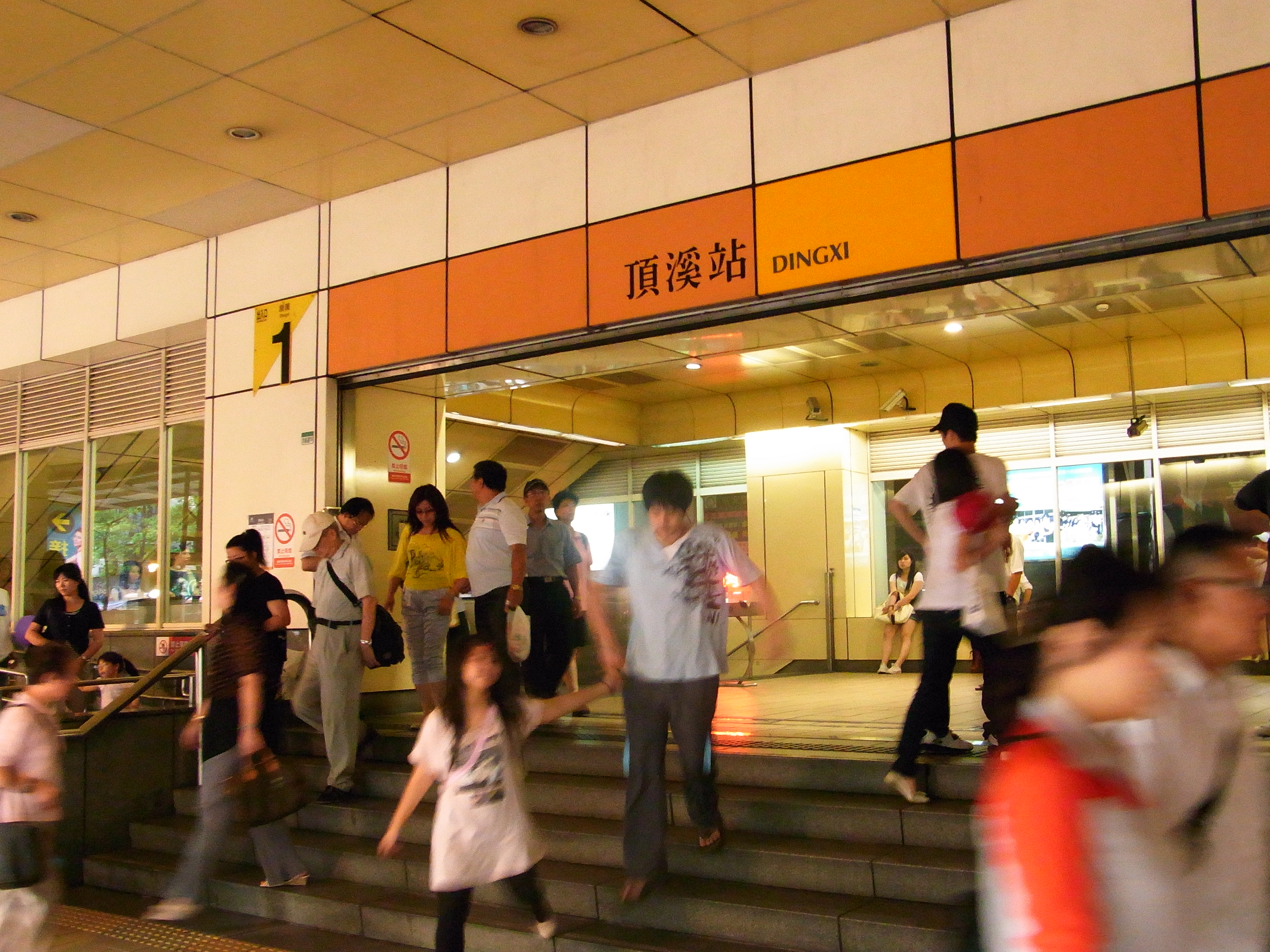
Dingxi Station

Yonghe is served by the Zhonghe–Xinlu Line of the Taipei Metro, one station of which are located in the district: Dingxi. A new station, Yonghe Yongping Elementary School, will open in 2027 on the Wanda–Shulin Line.

In addition, Fuhe Bridge passes through Yonghe and has an interchange there, as does the MacAuthur 1st & 2nd bridges.

Three major bridges connect Yonghe with other districts:

- Yongfu Bridge (永福橋) - Zhongxiao Xinsheng, Zhongzheng and Daan districts, Taipei
- Fuhe Bridge (福和橋) - Gongguan and Taipower Building, Zhongzheng and Daan districts, Taipei
- Zhongzheng Bridge (中正橋) - Xiaonanmen, Zhongzheng District, Taipei
- Yongle Bridge (永利橋) - Guting and Dongmen, Zhongzheng and Daan districts, Taipei

== Education ==
Yonghe is where Xiulang Elementary School (aka Shou-lang Elementary School) is located. Xiulang was once the world's largest elementary school by number of students.

== Notable natives ==
- Jay Shih, actor, singer and TV host
- Megan Lai, singer and actress
- Stephanie Shiao, actress, model, singer and writer
- Yang San-lang, former painter
