= Zhonghe Senior High School metro station =

Wanda-Zhonghe-Shulin Line's under-construction MRT Station

Zhonghe Senior High School LG08 中和高中

Chinese name
- Chinese: 中和高中
Transcriptions
Standard Mandarin
- Hanyu Pinyin: Zhōnghégāozhōng
- Bopomofo: ㄓㄨㄥㄏㄜˊㄍㄠㄓㄨㄥ
Hakka
- Pha̍k-fa-sṳ: Chûng-fò Kô-chûng
Southern Min
- Tâi-lô: Tiong-hô Koo-tiong

General information
- Location: Zhonghe, New Taipei; Taiwan
- Coordinates: 24.99494°N 121.48031°E
- Operated by: Taipei Metro
- Line: Wanda–Zhonghe–Shulin line (LG08)

Construction
- Structure type: Underground

Other information
- Station code: LG08

History
- Opening: December 2025 (expected)

Services
Preceding station	Taipei Metro	Following station
Liancheng Jinhe towards Chiang Kai-shek Memorial Hall	Wanda–Shulin line Future Service	Juguang Terminus
Liancheng Jinhe towards Chiang Kai-shek Memorial Hall	Wanda–Shulin line Future Service Phase 2	Tingliao towards Huilong
Terminus	Wanda–Shulin line Juguang Branch Future Service	Juguang Terminus
Location

Zhonghe Senior High School is an under-construction metro station on the Wanda–Zhonghe–Shulin line located in Zhonghe, New Taipei, Taiwan. It was scheduled to open at the end of 2025.

== Station overview ==
This will be a two-level, underground station with an island platform. The station will possess abundant natural resources and reflect the idea of a living museum throughout the entire line, which is based on the natural mountain forestry concept of the "Rhythm of Ecology."

== Station layout ==
1F	Street level	Entrance/exit
B1	Concourse	Lobby, information desk, automatic ticketing dispensing machines, one-way faregates (under construction); Restrooms (under construction)
B2	Platform 1	Wanda-Zhonghe-Shulin line toward Chiang Kai-shek Memorial Hall (LG07 Liancheng Jinhe)
B2	Island platform, under construction
B2	Platform 2	Wanda-Zhonghe-Shulin line toward Juguang (LG08A Terminus)

== Around the station ==
- New Taipei Municipal Zhonghe Senior High School
