= Nan Shan Power Center =

Shopping mall in Zhonghe, New Taipei, Taiwan

- 南山威力購物廣場
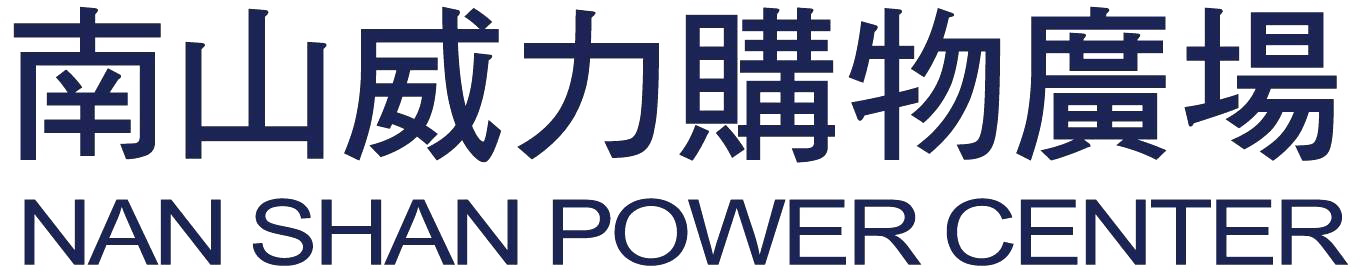

- Location: No. 291, Section 2, Zhongshan Road, Zhonghe District, New Taipei, Taiwan
- Coordinates: 25°0′15″N 121°29′47″E
- Opened: 2003
- Owner: Nan Shan Life Insurance Company, Ltd.
- Floor area: 121,315 m^{2} (1,305,820 sq ft)
- Floors: 10 floors above ground 5 floors below ground
- Parking: 1143
- Public transit: Zhonghe metro station

Nan Shan Power Center (Chinese: 南山威力購物廣場; pinyin: Nán Shān Wēi Lì Gòuwù Guǎngchǎng) is a shopping center in Zhonghe District, New Taipei, Taiwan that opened in 2003. Owned and operated by Nan Shan Life Insurance Company, Ltd., it is the first and largest shopping mall in the district. The total floor area is about 71,395.7 m^{2} (768,497 sq ft), ranging from level ten above ground to level B2. The main core stores of the mall include Carrefour, Tsannkuen and various themed restaurants. The mall is located in close proximity to Zhonghe metro station.

== Floor guide ==
Roof	Parking lot
Level 10	Themed restaurants
Levels 8 & 9	Fitness Center
Level 7	Leisure and sports
Level 6	Toys and manga
Level 5	Home appliances
Levels 3 & 4	Electronics (Hola and Tsannkuen)
Levels 1 & 2	Furniture and home furnishing
B1 & B2	Carrefour supermarket
B3 - B5	Parking spaces

== Gallery ==
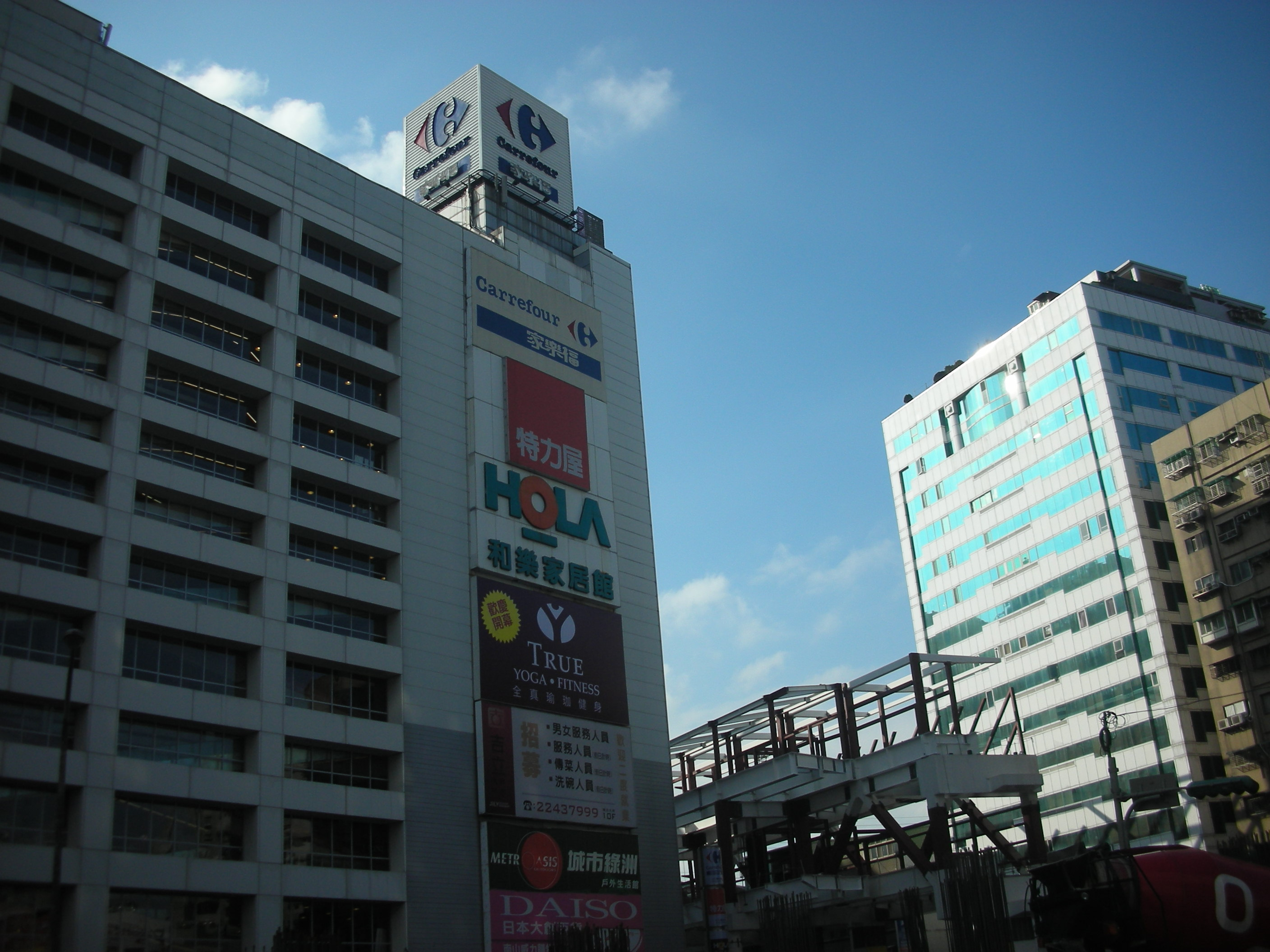

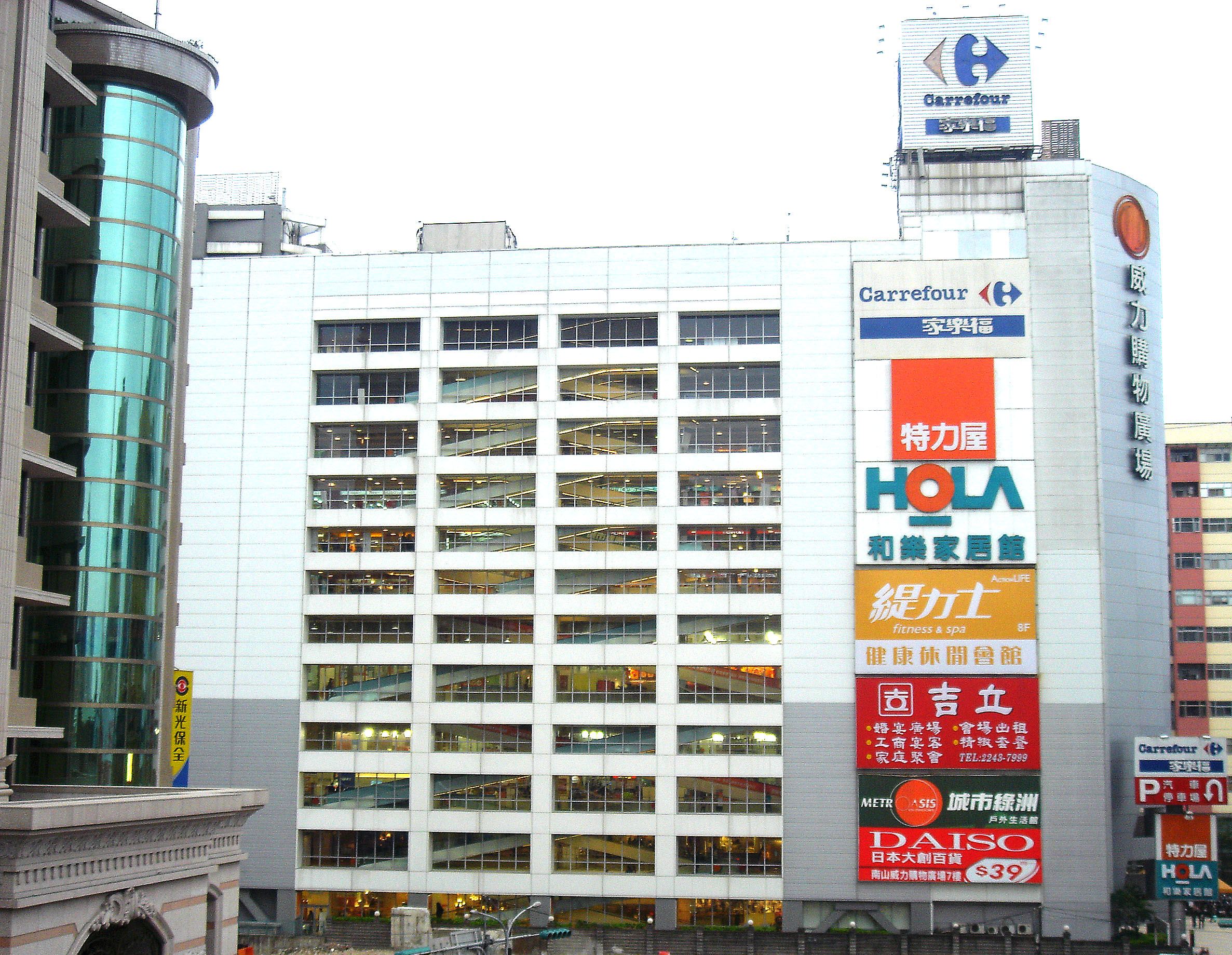
Exterior

== See also ==
- List of tourist attractions in Taiwan
