= Taipei Botanical Garden metro station =

Wanda-Zhonghe-Shulin Line's under-construction MRT Station

Taipei Botanical Garden LG02 植物園
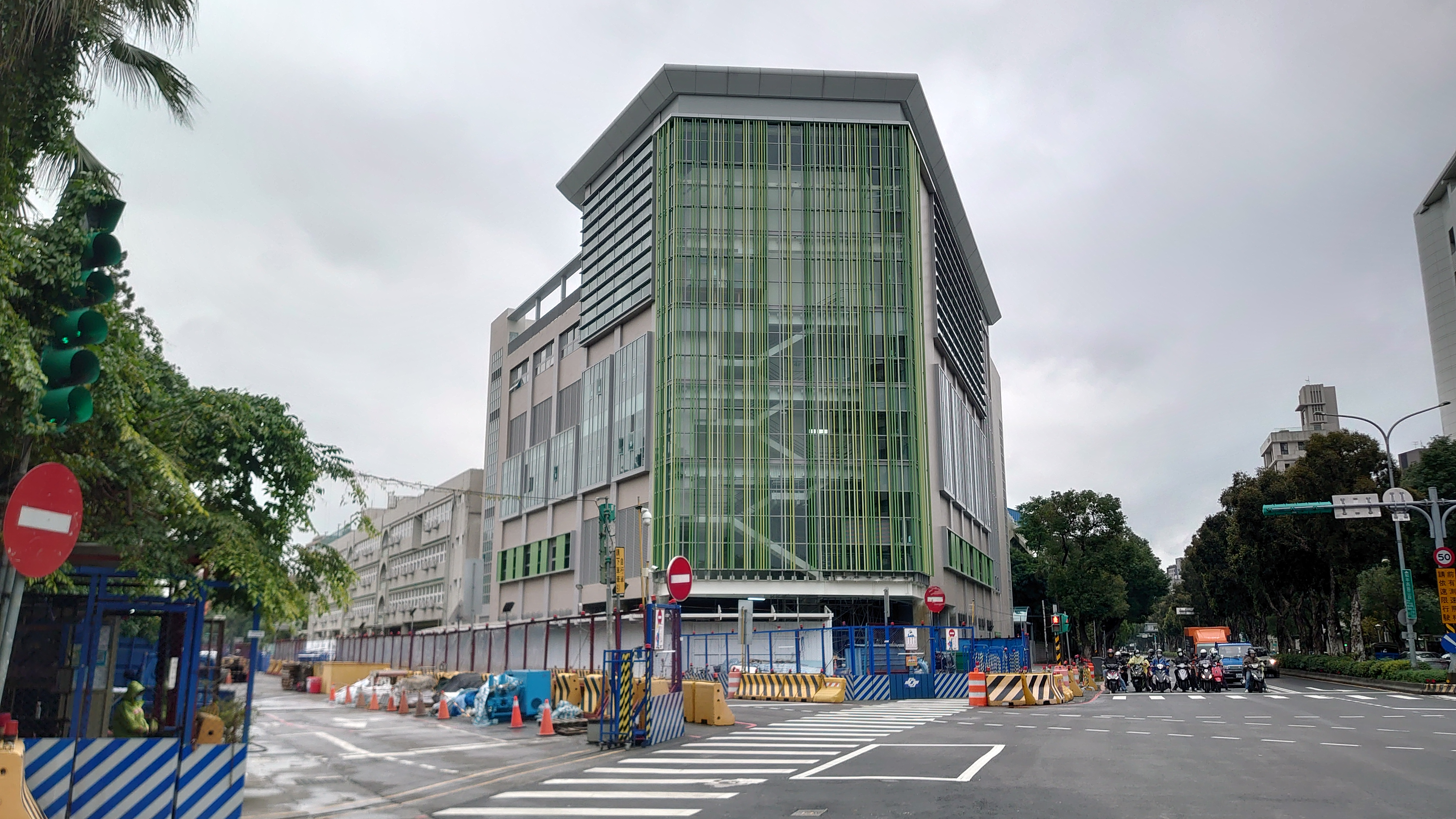

Chinese name
- Traditional Chinese: 植物園
- Simplified Chinese: 植物园
Transcriptions
Standard Mandarin
- Hanyu Pinyin: Zhíwùyuán
- Bopomofo: ㄓˊㄨˋㄩㄢˊ

General information
- Location: No. 53 Nanhai Rd. Zhongzheng, Taipei; Taiwan
- Coordinates: 25.03073118°N 121.50943957°E
- Operated by: Taipei Metro
- Line: Wanda–Zhonghe–Shulin line (LG02)

Construction
- Structure type: Underground

Other information
- Station code: LG02

History
- Opening: June 2027 (expected)

Services
Preceding station	Taipei Metro	Following station
Chiang Kai-shek Memorial Hall Terminus	Wanda–Shulin line under construction	Xiaan towards Juguang
Location

Taipei Botanical Garden is an under-construction metro station on the Wanda–Zhonghe–Shulin line located in Zhongzheng, Taipei, Taiwan. It is scheduled to open in June 2027.

== Station overview ==
This will be a three-level, underground station with an island platform. The theme of the station will be based on the "Recollection of Taipei" while elements of cultural heritage sites and the botanical garden are blended into the space, together with the exhibition area of the cultural heritage site to display the particularity of the station's location in the history and culture of Taipei City.

== Station layout ==
1F	Street level	Entrance/exit
B1	Concourse	Lobby, information desk, ticket vending machines, turnstiles (under construction); Restrooms, artifacts exhibition area (under construction)
B3	Platform 1	Wanda–Shulin line toward Chiang Kai-Shek Memorial Hall (LG01 Terminus)
B3	Island platform, under construction
B3	Platform 2	Wanda–Shulin line toward Huilong or Juguang (LG03 Xiaan)

== Around the station ==
- Taipei Botanical Garden
- Nanhai Academy
- Taipei Mandarin Experimental Elementary School
