= LGB =

LGB may refer to:

== Places ==
- La Grande Boissière, a campus of the International School of Geneva
- Long Beach Airport (IATA code LGB), California, US

== Other uses ==
- Prostephanus truncatus, the larger grain borer
- Laser-guided bomb
- Lectures on Government and Binding, a book by Noam Chomsky
- Lesbian, gay, and bisexual
- Let's Go Bowling, American ska band
- "Let's Go Brandon", a euphemistic expression to replace "Fuck Joe Biden"
- LGB (trains), Lehmann Gross Bahn, a model of garden railroad
- LGB Alliance
- Formula LGB, a racecar category
- Laghu language (ISO 639 code lgb)

== See also ==
- LG8 (disambiguation)
