= LGI Homes =

Housebuilding company in the United States

- Traded as: Nasdaq: LGIH; S&P 600 component
- Industry: Construction
- Founded: 2003 as Lippar Group Inc.
- Headquarters: The Woodlands, Texas, U.S.
- Key people: Thomas Lipar, Founder; Eric Lipar, CEO; Mike Snider, President
- Revenue: ▼US$1.71 billion (2025)
- Number of employees: 1001
- Website: lgihomes.com

LGI Homes is a Texas-based builder of new construction homes and housing developments, with its development projects mostly focused in the southwestern region of the United States. According to Builder Magazine, LGI Homes is the tenth largest home builder in the United States. 2013, the company announced the pricing of its initial public offering: 9,000,000 shares at $11 per share. 2019, LGI Homes closed 7,690 homes, which was an 18.1% increase over 2018. Home sales revenue in 2019 was $1.8 billion, a 22.2% increase over 2018.

== History ==
LGI Homes was founded in 2003 in The Woodlands, Texas by Thomas Lipar and began building in the Houston area. LGI Homes focuses on entry-level housing in the vicinity of major metropolitan areas. Its primary customer is the first-time homebuyer. The company saw sales trend upward from 2006 to 2008, when it was the only builder in the Builder Magazine Top-200 builders to generate unit sales and see revenue growth across that period. The company's growth slowed in 2009, when LGI Homes experienced a 9% drop in home sales, year-over-year.

In 2013, the company announced that they would be expanding to the southeast, and that plans to develop new home communities in Florida and Georgia were in place. LGI Homes began publicly trading shares of their company on 7 November 2013. The share price of the initial 9 million shares rose from $11 per share to $12.26 by market closing, an increase of 11%. The company planned to use the $90 million they raised to grow their company particularly in Texas.

In October 2014, the company purchased Oakmont Home Builders and expanded into North Carolina, South Carolina.

In 2015, they expanded into Colorado, and in 2018 LGI Homes acquired the assets of Wynn Homes. This acquisition earned the homebuilder over 200 under-construction homes and approximately 4,000 lots.

As of 25 February 2020, LGI Homes has operations in 31 markets in 18 states.

== See also ==
- Housing estate
