= LGG =

LGG may refer to:

Popular culture

- Lady Gaga, an American singer
  - Lisa Goes Gaga, a Simpsons episode containing the person above
- The Living Greyhawk Gazetteer, a Dungeons and Dragons sourcebook

Abbreviations for locations

- Lagang Toll Plaza on the Guthrie Corridor Expressway, Malaysia (official abbreviation)
- Langley Green railway station, England (station abbreviation)
- Liège Airport, Belgium (IATA abbreviation)

Science and technology

- Light-gas gun
- Lyons Groups of Galaxies, astronomical catalog
- One trademark for a form of Lactobacillus rhamnosus named after its discoverers Sherwood Gorbach and Barry Goldin
- Low Grade Glioma, i.e. Glioma classified as Low Grade according to a Grading scheme for tumours and other neoplasma

Other uses

- Lugbara language, a language of Uganda and the Democratic Republic of the Congo (ISO 639-3 code)
