= Chiang Kai-shek Memorial Hall metro station =

Metro station in Taipei, Taiwan

Chiang Kai-shek Memorial Hall (Nanmen) / /LG01 中正紀念堂（南門）
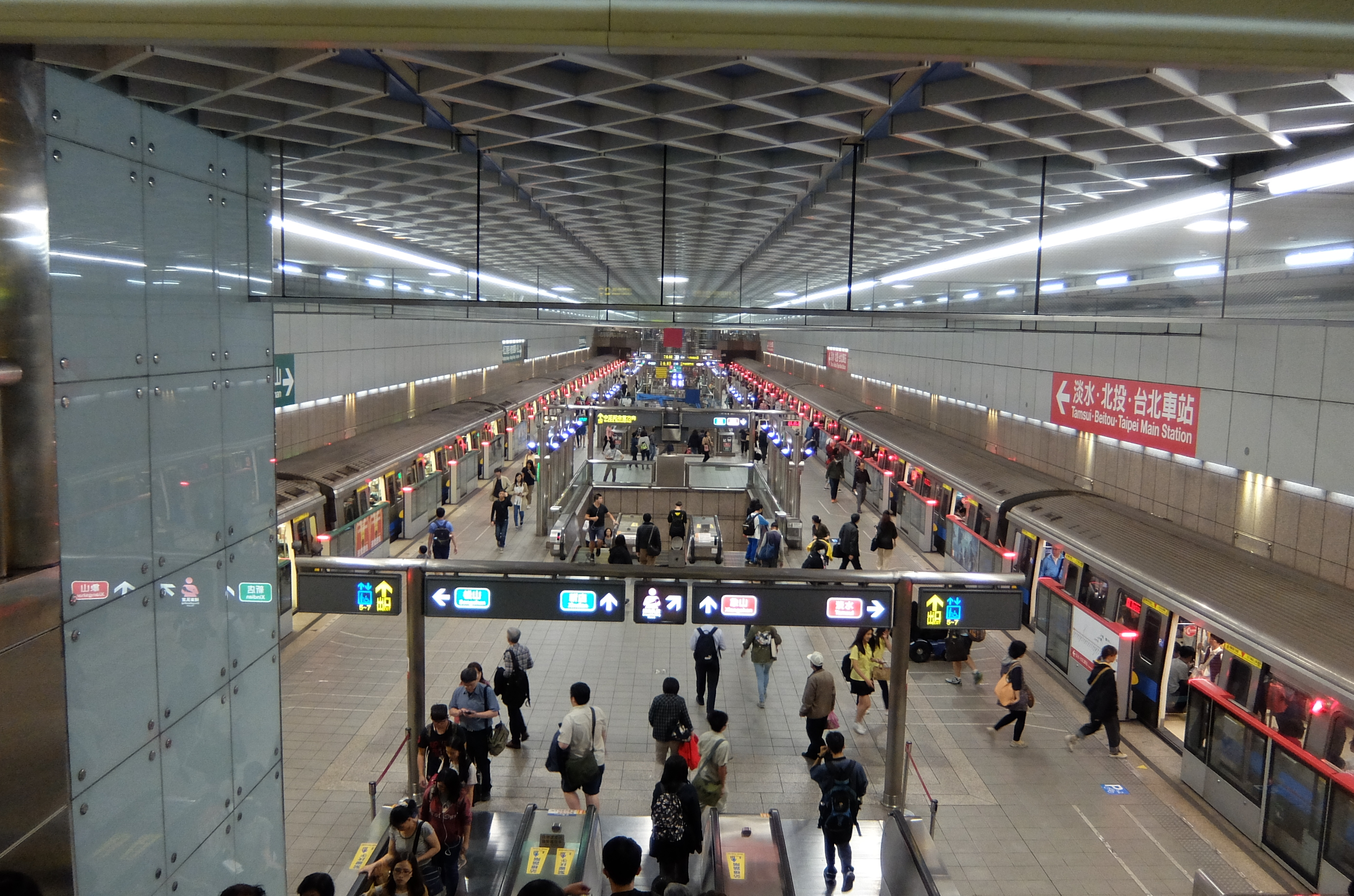
- Platform

Chinese name
- Traditional Chinese: 中正紀念堂 (南門)
- Simplified Chinese: 中正纪念堂 (南门)
- Literal meaning: Chiang Kai-shek Memorial Hall (South Gate)
Transcriptions
Standard Mandarin
- Hanyu Pinyin: Zhōngzhèng Jìniàntáng (Nánmén)
- Bopomofo: ㄓㄨㄥ ㄓㄥˋ ㄐㄧˋ ㄋㄧㄢˋ ㄊㄤˊ (ㄋㄢˊ ㄇㄣˊ)
- Wade–Giles: Chung¹-cheng⁴ Chi⁴-nien⁴-t'ang² (Nan¹-men²)
Hakka
- Pha̍k-fa-sṳ: Chûng-chṳn Ki-ngiam-thòng (Nàm-mùn)
Southern Min
- Tâi-lô: Tiong-tsìng Kì-liām-tn̂g (Lâm-mn̂g)

General information
- Location: B1F 119-3 Sec 1 Roosevelt Rd; Zhongzheng and Da'an, Taipei; Taiwan
- Coordinates: 25.0327°N 121.5183°E
- System: Taipei Metro station
- Lines: Songshan–Xindian line Tamsui–Xinyi line Wanda–Shulin line

Construction
- Structure type: Underground
- Cycle facilities: Access available

Other information
- Station code: ,, LG01
- Website: web.metro.taipei/e/stationdetail2010.asp?ID=G10+R08-042

History
- Opened: 24 December 1998

Key dates
- 31 August 2000: Service to Ximen added
- 15 November 2014: Songshan–Xindian line added
- 2027: Wanda–Shulin line expected to add

Passengers
- 2017: 20.976 million per year ▼1.12%
- Rank: (Ranked 21 of 119)

Services
Preceding station	Taipei Metro	Following station
Dongmen towards Xiangshan or Daan	Tamsui–Xinyi line	NTU Hospital towards Tamsui or Beitou
Xiaonanmen towards Songshan	Songshan–Xindian line	Guting towards Taipower Building or Xindian
Terminus	Wanda–Shulin line	Taipei Botanical Garden towards Huilong or Juguang
Location

Chiang Kai-shek Memorial Hall (Chinese: 中正紀念堂; pinyin: Zhōngzhèng Jìniàntáng), secondary station name Nanmen (Chinese: 南門), is a metro station in Taipei, Taiwan served by the Taipei Metro. It is a transfer station for the Tamsui–Xinyi line and Songshan–Xindian line. While the memorial for which the station is named was embroiled in a controversial renaming in 2007, the name of the station has remained unchanged due to the Taipei City Council being controlled by the then-opposition Kuomintang.

== Station overview ==
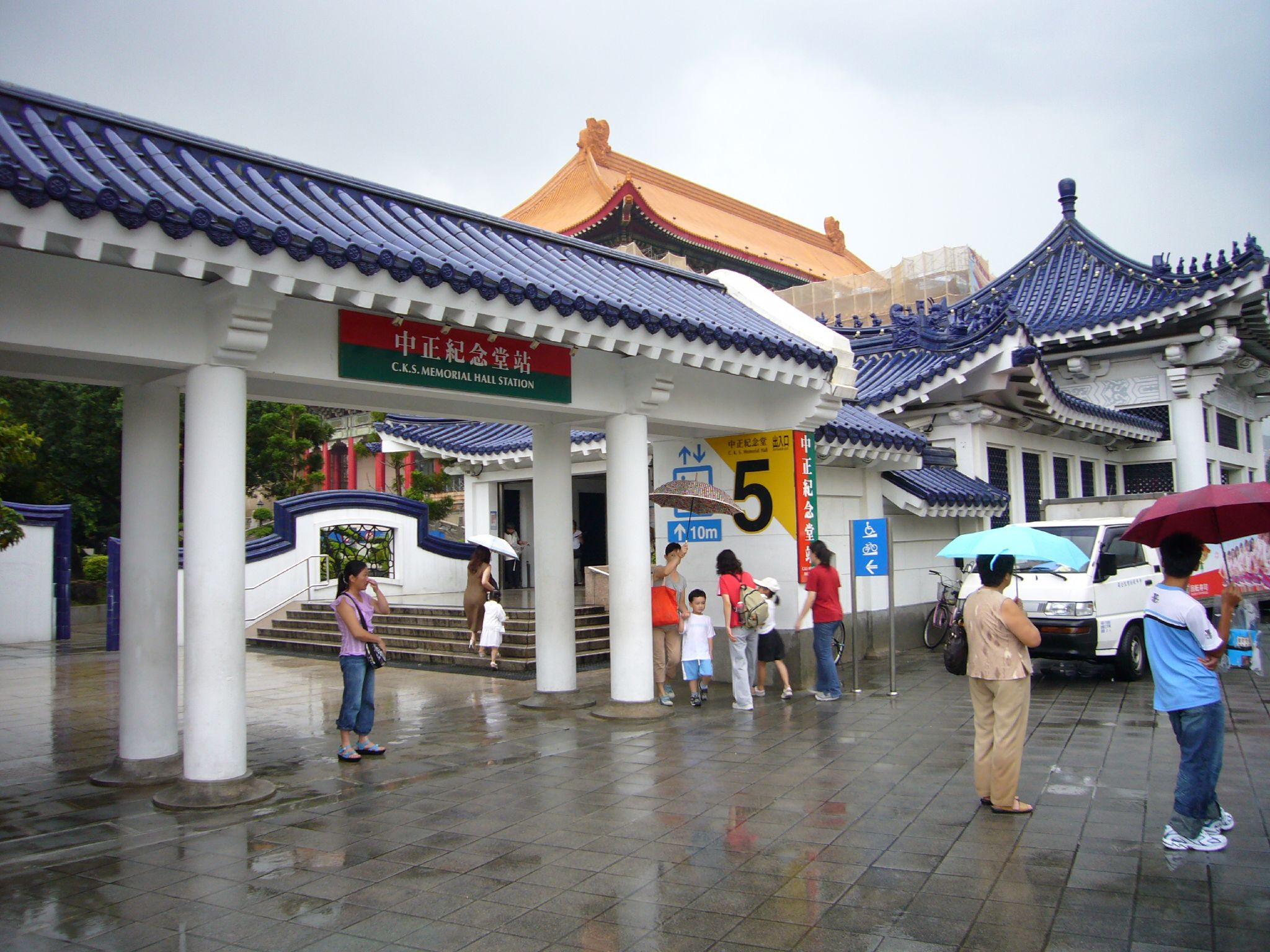
Exit 5

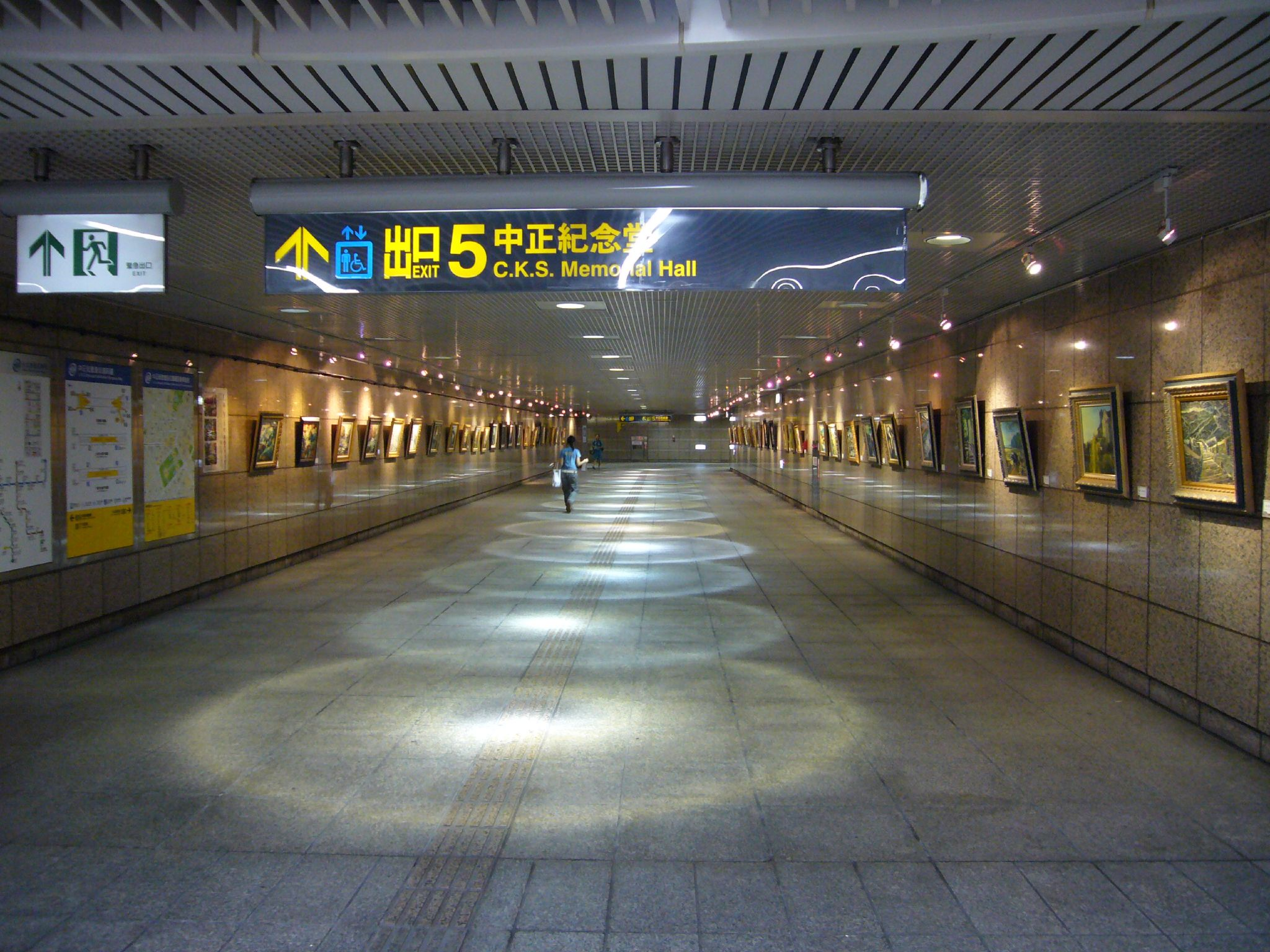
Art gallery in a hallway connecting exit 5 and the station lobby

The station is a three-level, underground structure with two island platforms and seven exits. The two platforms are stacked on top of one another, allowing for cross-platform interchange between the Tamsui–Xinyi line and the Songshan–Xindian line. The washrooms are outside the entrance area. The station is situated under Roosevelt Road, between Nanhai Road, Linsen South Road, and Aiguo East Road. It also connects to the Chiang Kai-shek Memorial Hall and some government agencies located around the area.

From 15 November 2014, the station became a transfer station with the Songshan–Xindian line. The Wanda–Zhonghe–Shulin line will serve as the terminus of this station, scheduled to open in June 2027.

== Public art ==
The station is home to several public art pieces. By the escalators connecting the two platform levels, a piece titled "Metamorphosis" displays a holographic flight trajectory of a paper plane. Along some of the entrance hallways, "Musical Skies" shows light boxes with images clouds in a blue sky. On the upper platform in "Platform, Stage", elements from Taiwanese folk arts and Chinese opera have been transformed into abstract elements and minimized into two curtains of lines and flat surfaces.

== Station layout ==
Street level	Exit/entrance	Exit/entrance
B1	Northern Concourse	Lobby, one-way ticket machine, information desk
B1	Northern Concourse	toilets
B1	Southern Concourse	Lobby, one-way ticket machine, information desk
B1	Southern Concourse	toilets
B2	Platform 1	← Tamsui–Xinyi line toward Tamsui / Beitou (R09 NTU Hospital)
B2	Island platform, doors will open on the left for Tamsui–Xinyi Line, right for Songshan–Xindian Line
B2	Platform 2	← Songshan–Xindian line toward Songshan (G11 Xiaonanmen)
B2	Platform 1	→ Wanda–Zhonghe–Shulin line toward Juguang (LG02 Taipei Botanical Garden)
B2	Island platform, under construction
B2	Platform 2	→ Wanda–Zhonghe–Shulin line toward Juguang (LG02 Taipei Botanical Garden)
B3	Platform 3	→ Tamsui–Xinyi line toward Xiangshan / Daan (R07 Dongmen) →
B3	Island platform, doors will open on the right for Tamsui–Xinyi line, left for Songshan–Xindian line
B3	Platform 4	→ Songshan–Xindian line toward Xindian / Taipower Building (G09 Guting) →

== Around the station ==
- Chiang Kai-shek Memorial Hall
- Liberty Square
- Nanmen Market
- Taipei South Gate
- National Concert Hall
