= Juguang metro station =

Metro station in Taipei, Taiwan

Juguang LG08A 莒光

General information
- Location: Zhonghe, New Taipei; Taiwan
- Coordinates: 24.99522°N 121.47031°E
- System: Future Taipei Metro station
- Line: Wanda-Zhonghe-Shulin line
- Platforms: 1 (Island Platform)

Construction
- Structure type: Underground

Other information
- Station code: LG08A

History
- Opening: 2025

Services
Preceding station	Taipei Metro	Following station
Zhonghe Senior High School Terminus	Wanda–Shulin line Juguang Branch Future Service	Terminus
Location

Juguang metro station is a station on the first phase of the Wanda–Zhonghe–Shulin line, as part of the Juguang Branch Line, located in Zhonghe, Taipei, Taiwan. This station was scheduled to open at the end of 2025.

== Station overview ==
This is a two-level, underground station with one island platform. The design theme of the station is based on "Harmony and Integration", which aims to symbolise the relationship between human beings and cities, with the light walls of the station transforming imagery of plants into simple, abstract organic lines.

== Station layout ==
1F
Street level
Entrance/exit
B1
Concourse
Lobby, information desk, automatic ticketing dispensing machines, one-way faregates (under construction)

Restrooms (under construction)

B3
Platform 1
<- Wanda-Zhonghe-Shulin line toward Zhonghe Senior High School (LG08 terminus)
Island platform, under construction
Platform 2
<- Wanda-Zhonghe-Shulin line toward Zhonghe Senior High School (LG08 terminus)
