= LG (disambiguation) =

LG is a South Korean electronics and petrochemicals conglomerate.

LG or lg may also refer to:

== Arts and entertainment ==
- Lawful Good, an alignment in the role-playing game Dungeons & Dragons
- Living Greyhawk, a popular Dungeons & Dragons campaign
- Lockhart & Gardner, a fictional law firm on the US TV series The Good Wife (season 5)
- Pokémon LeafGreen

== Businesses and organizations ==
- LG Electronics, an affiliate of the South Korean LG Group which produces electronic products
- Laclede Group (NYSE stock symbol LG)
- Lafarge (company) (Euronext stock symbol LG)
- Lawrence Graham, a London-headquartered firm of business lawyers
- Liberty Global, a British multinational telecommunications company
- Lietuvos Geležinkeliai, the Lithuanian state railway company
- Luxair, the flag carrier airline of Luxembourg (IATA code LG)
- Luminosity Gaming, a Canadian esports organisation
- Letzte Generation, a German environmental organization

== Science, technology, and mathematics ==
=== Mathematics ===
- Binary logarithm, with base 2
- Common logarithm, with base 10
- Liouville–Green method, another name for the WKB approximation

=== Other uses in science and technology ===
- Lateral giant interneuron, an interneuron in crayfish
- Liquid Glass, a GUI design language
- Lymphomatoid granulomatosis, a very rare lymphoproliferative disorder

== Other uses ==
- LG, post-nominal letters used to signify a Lady Companion of the Order of the Garter
- Luganda language (ISO 639-1 language code)
