= Wanda–Zhonghe–Shulin Line =

Under construction MRT route in Taipei

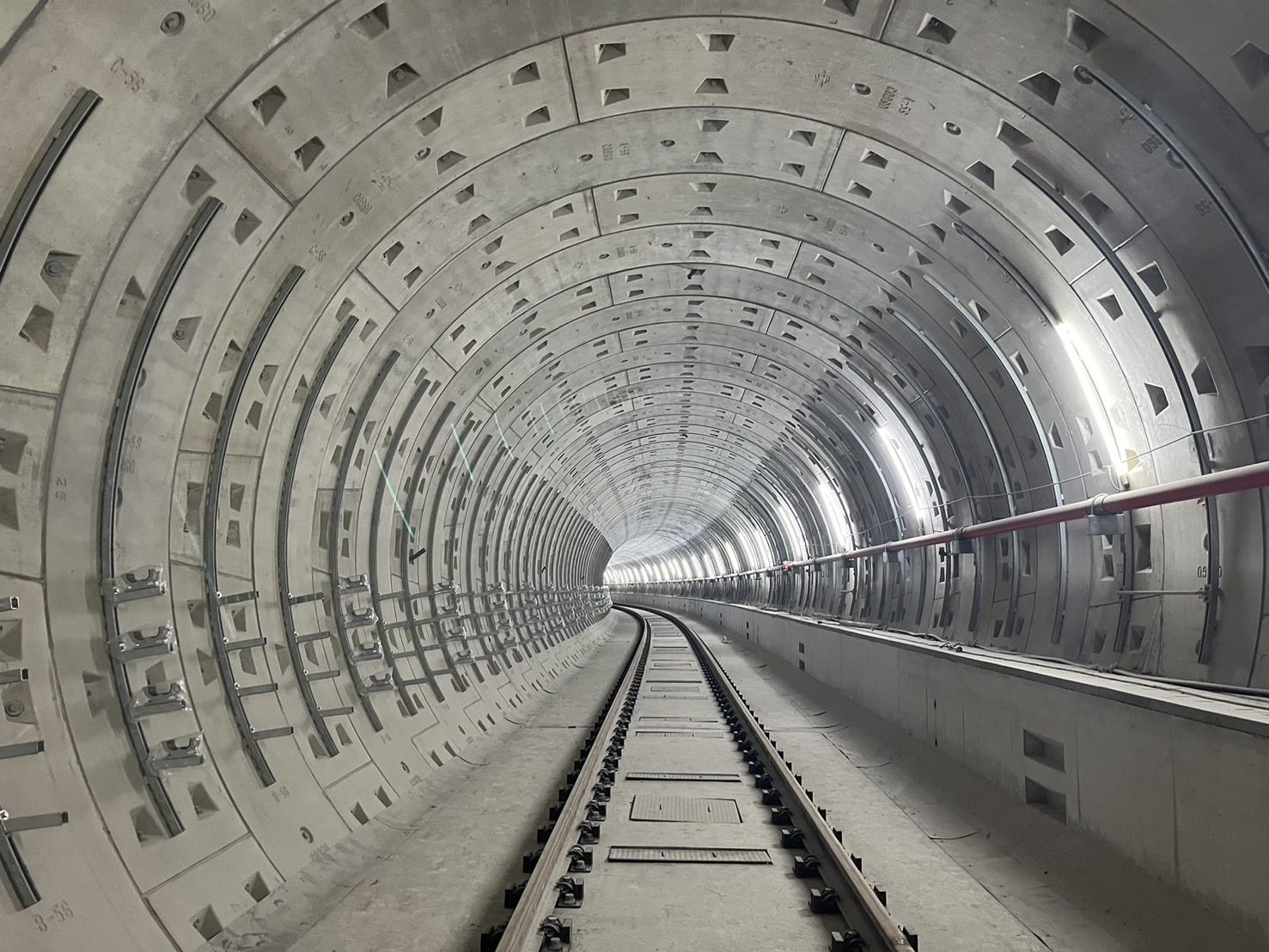
- Wanda Line tunnel under construction

Overview
- Native name: 萬大—中和—樹林線
- Owner: Taipei DORTS; New Taipei DORTS
- Locale: Taipei and New Taipei, Taiwan
- Termini: Chiang Kai-shek Memorial Hall; Juguang, Huilong
- Stations: 22
- Color on map: Light green

Service
- Type: Rapid transit
- System: Taipei Metro
- Route number: LG
- Operator: Taipei Rapid Transit Corporation
- Depot: Jincheng
- Rolling stock: 19 Alstom Metropolis

History
- Planned opening: LG01 - LG09: June 2027; LG10 - LG21: June 2031

Technical
- Line length: 22.1 km (13.7 mi)
- Character: Underground, elevated
- Track gauge: 1,435 mm (4 ft 8 1/2 in) standard gauge

The Wanda–Zhonghe–Shulin Line (Chinese: 萬大—中和—樹林線), also known as Light Green Line (Chinese: 淺綠線), is a metro line under construction in Taipei. It is managed by the Taipei City Government Department of Rapid Transit Systems and scheduled to be complete in 2027. Following the Taipei Metro's color coding scheme, the Wanda-Zhonghe-Shulin Line will be light green, coding the line as LG. When Phase I is completed, the line is expected to carry 270,000 riders per day, and passengers will be able to travel between the terminus at Zhonghe Senior High School and Taipei Main Station in 25 minutes.

== Routes ==
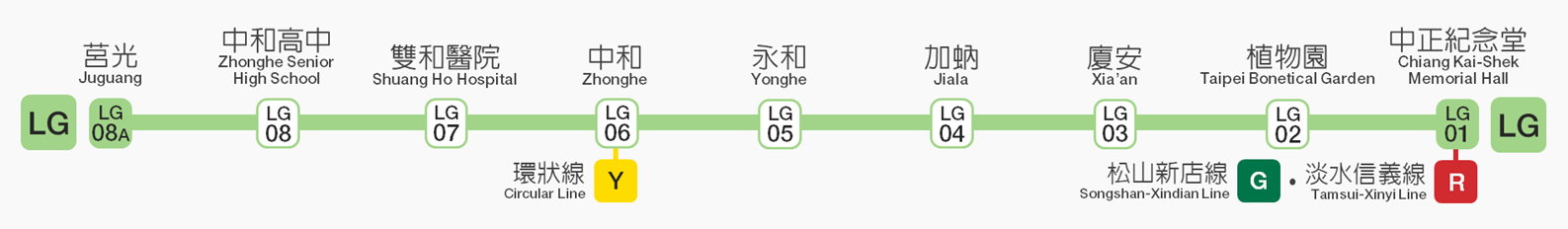
Wanda Line phase 1 stations

Wanda–Zhonghe–Shulin Line is the medium-capacity route and consists of Phase I and Phase II. Phase I was approved by the Executive Yuan on 12 February 2010. It is split into two phases. Phase I consists of nine underground stations and a depot in Jincheng Road. The 9.5 km long line (Phase I) will connect to the Songshan–Xindian Line at Chiang Kai-shek Memorial Hall (LG01), one of its termini. Also, this line goes under the Xindian River between LG04 and LG05. Jincheng Road (LG08) is where the other terminus is located, and will be named Zhonghe Senior High School Station. A branch line consists of only Zhonghe Senior High School and Juguang stations.

Phase II has been approved for construction, as well. Its termini are located at Huilong (LG21) and Tingliao (LG09). Stations LG01 to LG10 are underground, while stations LG11 to LG21 are elevated. The Taipei City Government is the local authority. The funds will be borne by the Central Government and the New Taipei City Government. The total project funding is about 55.881 billion NTD. The current plan has been submitted to Ministry of Transportation and Communications on 26 January 2017. The ministry deliberated, and the high-speed railway engineering bureau of the ministry is conducting a written review operation in conjunction with relevant units. The second phase of the route is located within New Taipei City. At present, changes to urban planning and bidding for basic designs have begun. After the Taipei and New Taipei City conferences are held to reach a consensus, the plan will be submitted to the central government for further review. On 2 May 2018, the Ministry of Transportation and Communications merged the project into the second phase of the Forward-looking Infrastructure Development Program.

== Rolling stock ==
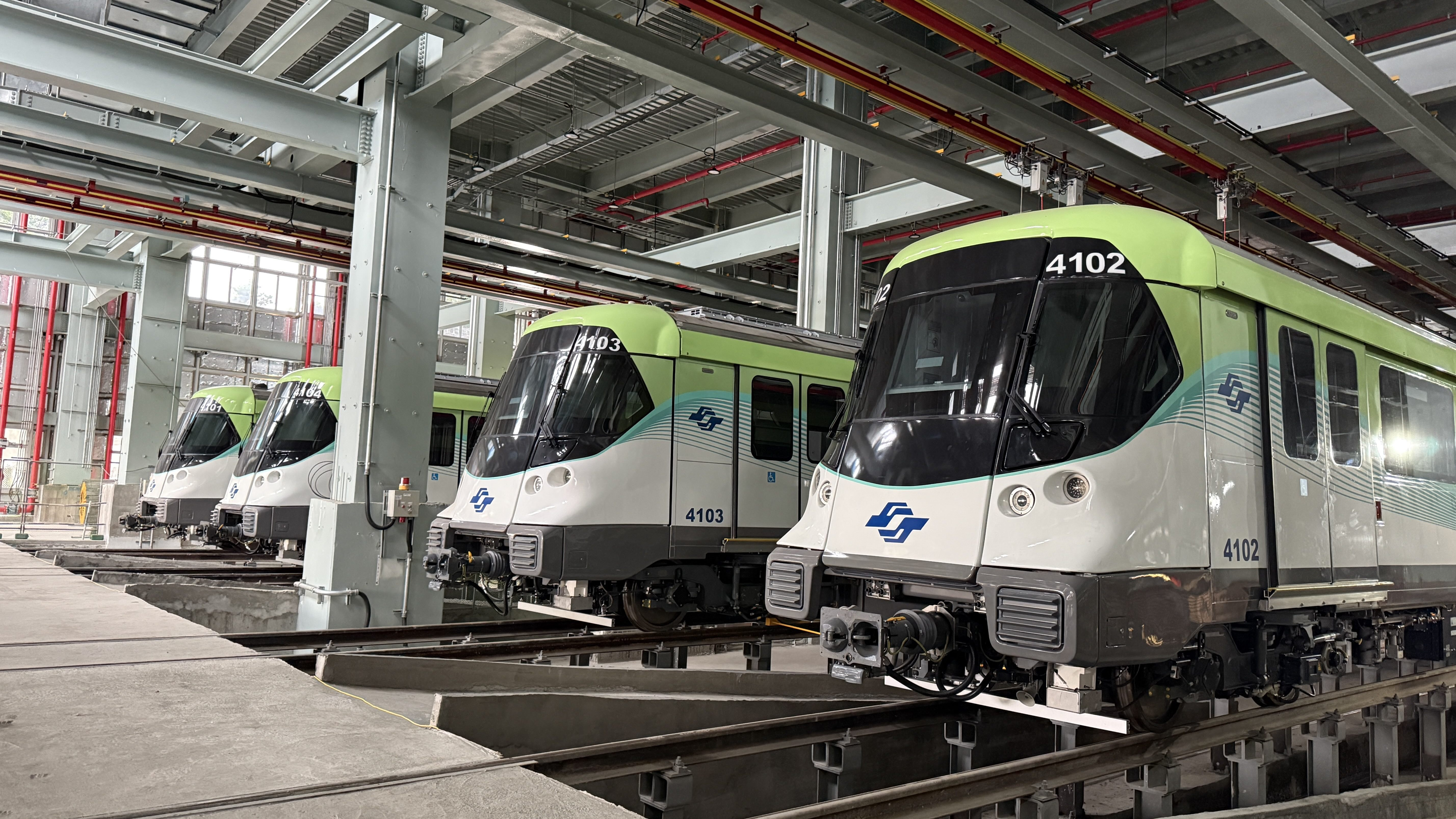
Wanda Line train at Jincheng depot

Wanda Line uses 19 sets of Alstom Metropolis manufactured in Taubaté. The trains are fully automated, with 108 seats, and can carry up to 700 passengers. The first batch were delivered in 2024.

== Stations ==
Code (Note: Italic for constructing or planning stations)	Station name	Station type		City, district		Sta. distance (km)		Opened date	Transfer
Code	Station name	Structure	Platform	City, district		Previous	Total	Opened date	Transfer
Wanda–Zhonghe–Shulin Line (main route)
LG01	Chiang Kai-shek Memorial Hall 中正紀念堂	Underground	Island	Taipei	Zhongzheng	—N/a	0.000	Est. June 2027	Tamsui–Xinyi Line; Songshan–Xindian Line
LG02	Taipei Botanical Garden 植物園	Underground	Island	Taipei	Zhongzheng	0.700	0.700	Est. June 2027	—N/a
LG03	Xiaan 廈安	Underground	Island	Taipei	Zhongzheng	0.900	1.600	Est. June 2027	—N/a
LG04	Kalah 加蚋	Underground	Island	Taipei	Wanhua	1.000	2.600	Est. June 2027	—N/a
LG05	Yonghe Yongping Elementary School 永和永平國小	Underground	Island	New Taipei	Yonghe	2.000	4.600	Est. June 2027	—N/a
LG06	Zhonghe 中和	Underground	Split	New Taipei	Zhonghe	1.400	6.000	Est. June 2027	Circular Line
LG07	Liancheng Jinhe 連城錦和	Underground	Island	New Taipei	Zhonghe	0.800	6.800	Est. June 2027	—N/a
LG08	Zhonghe Senior High School 中和高中	Underground	Island	New Taipei	Zhonghe	1.000	7.800	Est. June 2027	Juguang branch line
LG09	Unreleased	Underground	Island	New Taipei	Tucheng	1.800	9.600	Est. June 2027	—N/a
LG10	Unreleased	Underground	Island	New Taipei	Tucheng	1.000	10.600	Est. June 2031	—N/a
LG11	Tucheng 土城	Elevated	Side	New Taipei	Tucheng	1.600	12.200	Est. June 2031	Bannan Line
LG12	Unreleased	Elevated	Side	New Taipei	Tucheng	0.700	12.900	Est. June 2031	Bannan Line (BL02)
LG13	Unreleased	Elevated	Side	New Taipei	Tucheng	0.800	13.700	Est. June 2031	—N/a
LG14	Unreleased	Elevated	Split	New Taipei	Banqiao	1.700	15.400	Est. June 2031	—N/a
LG14	Unreleased	Elevated	Split	New Taipei	Shulin	1.700	15.400	Est. June 2031	—N/a
LG15	Unreleased	Elevated	Split	New Taipei	Shulin	0.900	16.300	Est. June 2031	—N/a
LG16	Unreleased	Elevated	Side	New Taipei	Shulin	0.600	16.900	Est. June 2031	—N/a
LG17	Unreleased	Elevated	Side	New Taipei	Shulin	1.000	17.900	Est. June 2031	—N/a
LG18	Unreleased	Elevated	Island	New Taipei	Shulin	1.000	18.900	Est. June 2031	—N/a
LG19	Unreleased	Elevated	Side	New Taipei	Shulin	1.100	20.000	Est. June 2031	—N/a
LG20	Unreleased	Elevated	Side	New Taipei	Shulin	0.900	20.900	Est. June 2031	—N/a
LG21	Huilong 迴龍	Elevated	Island	New Taipei	Xinzhuang	1.000	21.900	Est. June 2031	Zhonghe–Xinlu Line; Brown line
Wanda–Zhonghe–Shulin Line (Juguang branch)
LG08	Zhonghe Senior High School 中和高中	Underground	Island	New Taipei	Zhonghe	—N/a	0.000	Est. June 2027	Main route
LG08A	Juguang 莒光	Underground	Island	New Taipei	Zhonghe	1.600	1.600	Est. June 2027	Wugu-Taishan LRT

== Dates ==
- October 2014: Groundbreaking ceremony held in New Taipei City
- 8 November 2014: Groundbreaking ceremony held in Taipei City
