= Xinyi Songde metro station =

Planned metro station in Taipei, Taiwan

Xinyi Songde 信義松德

General information
- Location: Xinyi, Taipei; Taiwan
- Operated by: Taipei Rapid Transit System
- Line: Tamsui–Xinyi Line

Construction
- Structure type: Underground
Location

Xinyi Songde was a planned metro station in Xinyi, Taipei, Taiwan to be served by Taipei Metro. It was cancelled in 2015.

== Station overview ==
The station was planned to be an underground station located slightly east of the Xinyi Road and Songde Road intersection under Xinyi Road. It would be built as part of Xinyi Line's Eastern Extension and would be a two-level, underground station with an island platform.

== Planned layout ==
1F	Street Level	Entrance/Exit
B1	Concourse	Lobby, information desk, automatic ticketing dispensing machines, one-way faregates Restrooms
B2	Platform 1	Tamsui–Xinyi Line toward Tamsui (R02 Xiangshan)
B2	Platform 2	Tamsui–Xinyi Line toward Guangci/Fengtian Temple (R01 Terminus)
