= Xiangshan =

Xiangshan may refer to:

== Mainland China ==
- Xiangshan County, Guangdong, former county
- Xiangshan County, Zhejiang (象山县), a coastal county in Ningbo, Zhejiang
- Xiangshan District, Guilin (象山区), in Guilin, Guangxi
- Xiangshan District, Huaibei (相山区), in Huaibei, Anhui
- Fragrant Hills Park or Xiangshan Park (香山公园), in Haidian District, Beijing
- Xiangshan Subdistrict, Beijing, in Haidian District, Beijing
- Xiangshan, Zhangjiagang (香山), mountain in Jiangsu
- Zhongshan, city in Guangdong whose former name was Xiangshan
- Longmen Grottoes, area in Luoyang with a mountain named Xiangshan
- Xiangshan, Ma'anshan (向山镇), town in Yushan District, Ma'anshan, Anhui
- Xiangshan, Chongren County (相山镇), town in Jiangxi
- Xiangshan, Xinjian District (象山镇), town in Xinjian District, Nanchang, Jiangxi
- Xiangshan, Sichuan (象山镇), town in Daying County
- Xiangshan Subdistrict, Guilin (象山街道), in Xiangshan District, Guilin, Guangxi

== Taiwan ==
- Xiangshan, Taipei (象山), mountain and tourist spot in Taipei
- Xiangshan District, Hsinchu (香山區), in Hsinchu City
- Xiangshan Visitor Center (向山行政暨遊客中心), in Yuchi Township, Nantou County

== Others ==
- Lu Jiuyuan (1139–1192), also Lu Xiangshan, twelfth century scholar
- Beijing Xiangshan Forum

== See also ==
- Xiangshan station (disambiguation)
- 向山 (disambiguation)
