= Guandu metro station =

Metro station in Taipei, Taiwan

Guandu 關渡
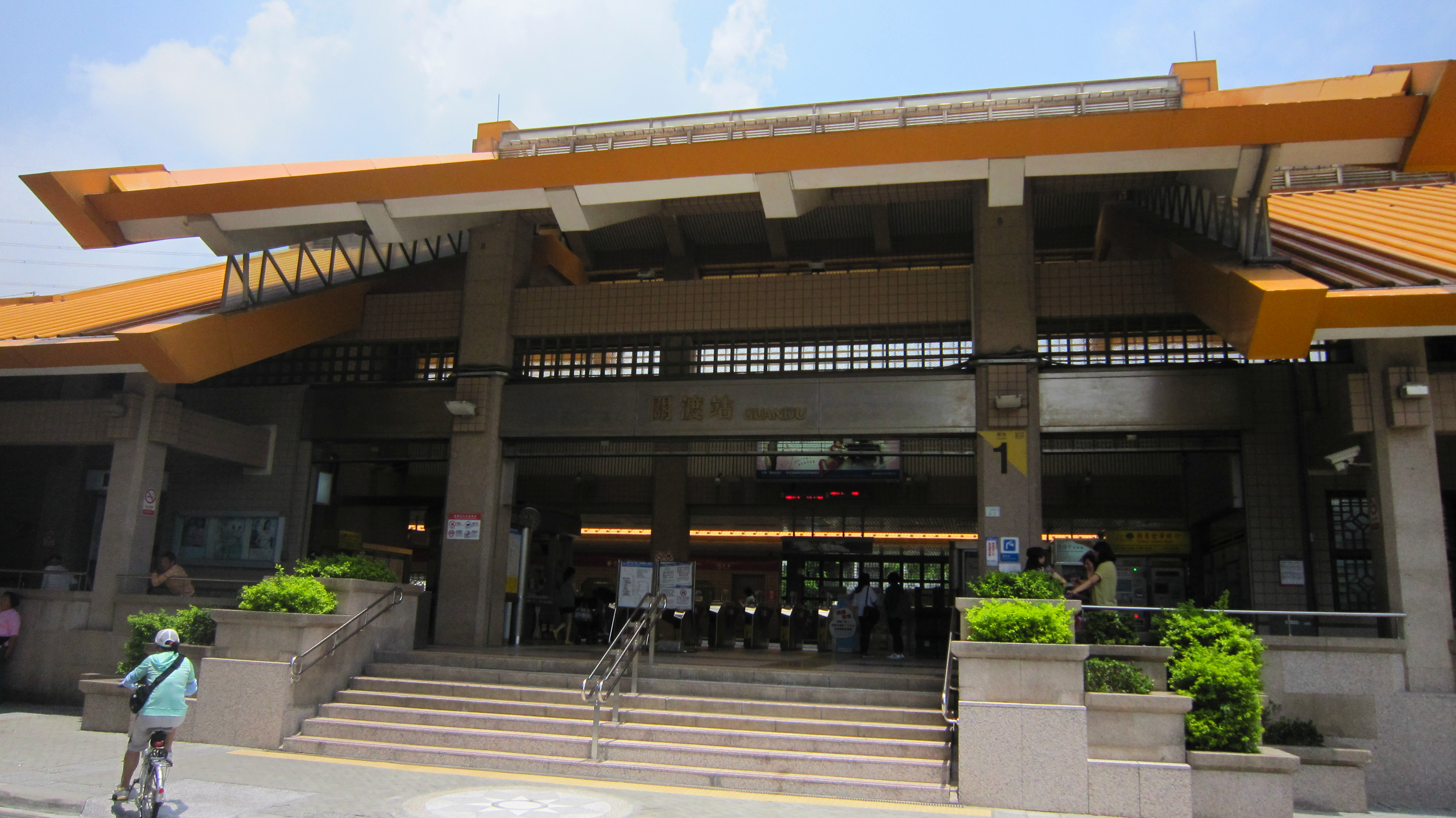

Chinese name
- Traditional Chinese: 關渡
- Simplified Chinese: 关渡
Transcriptions
Standard Mandarin
- Hanyu Pinyin: Guāndù
- Bopomofo: ㄍㄨㄢ ㄉㄨˋ
- Wade–Giles: Kuan^{1}-tu^{4}
- Tongyong Pinyin: Guandù
Hakka
- Pha̍k-fa-sṳ: Kôan-thu
Southern Min
- Hokkien POJ: Kan-tāu (干豆), Koan-tō͘ (關渡)
- Tâi-lô: Kan-tāu (干豆), Kuan-tōo (關渡)

General information
- Location: No. 51, Lane 296, Dadu Road, Sec. 3 Beitou, Taipei; Taiwan
- Coordinates: 25.125805°N 121.467338°E
- Operator: Taipei Metro
- Line: Tamsui–Xinyi Line
- Connections: Bus stop

Construction
- Structure type: At-Grade

Other information
- Station code: R25

History
- Opened: 28 March 1997
- Former names: Kuantu

Passengers
- daily (December 2024)
- Rank: 61 out of 109

Services
Preceding station	Taipei Metro	Following station
Zhongyi towards Xiangshan	Tamsui–Xinyi Line	Zhuwei towards Tamsui
Location

The Taipei Metro Guandu station (formerly transliterated as Kuantu station until 2003) is located in Beitou District, Taipei, Taiwan. It is a station on the Tamsui–Xinyi Line. In the past, the station belonged to the now-defunct TRA Tamsui line.

== Station overview ==
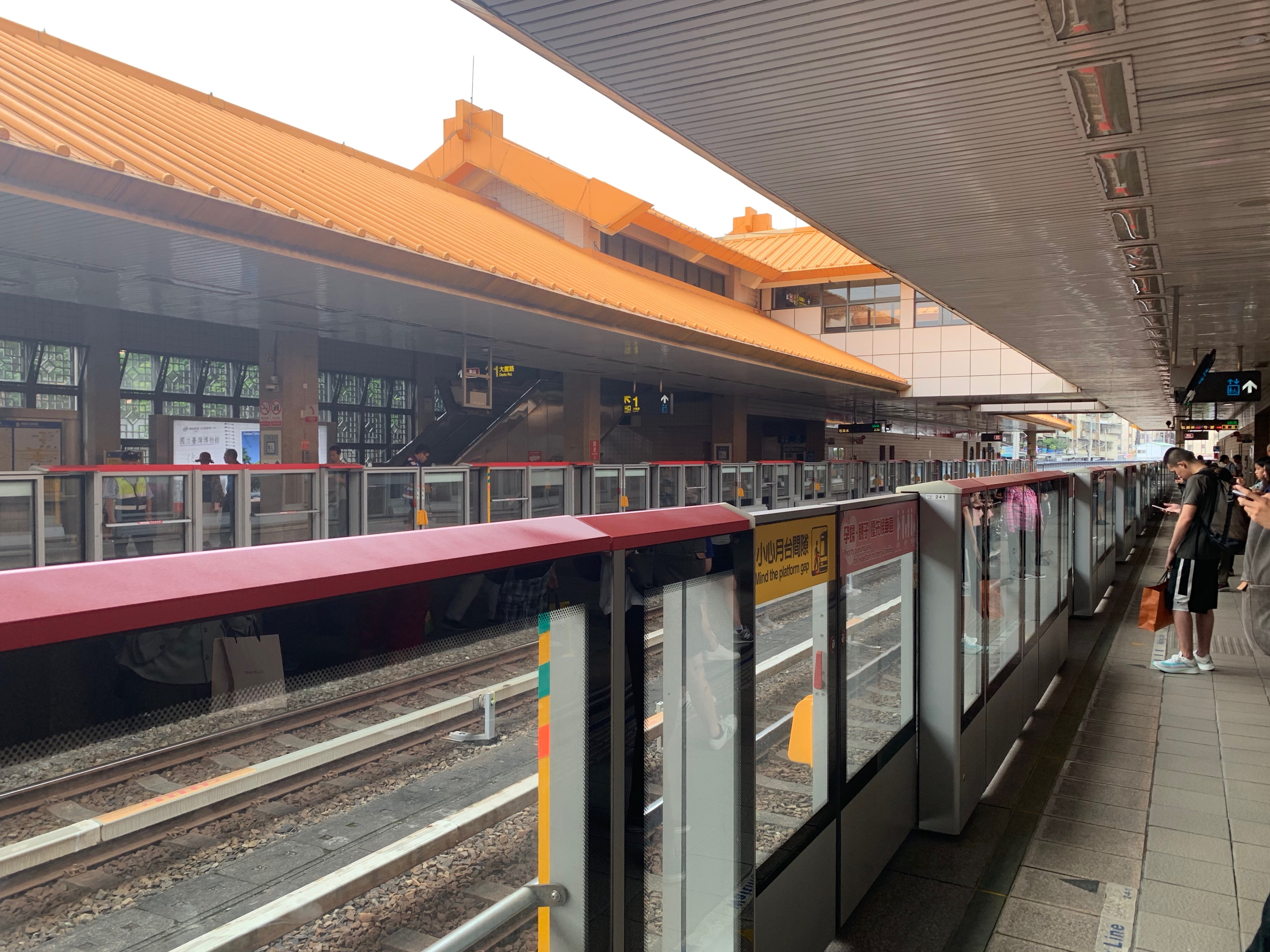
Platform

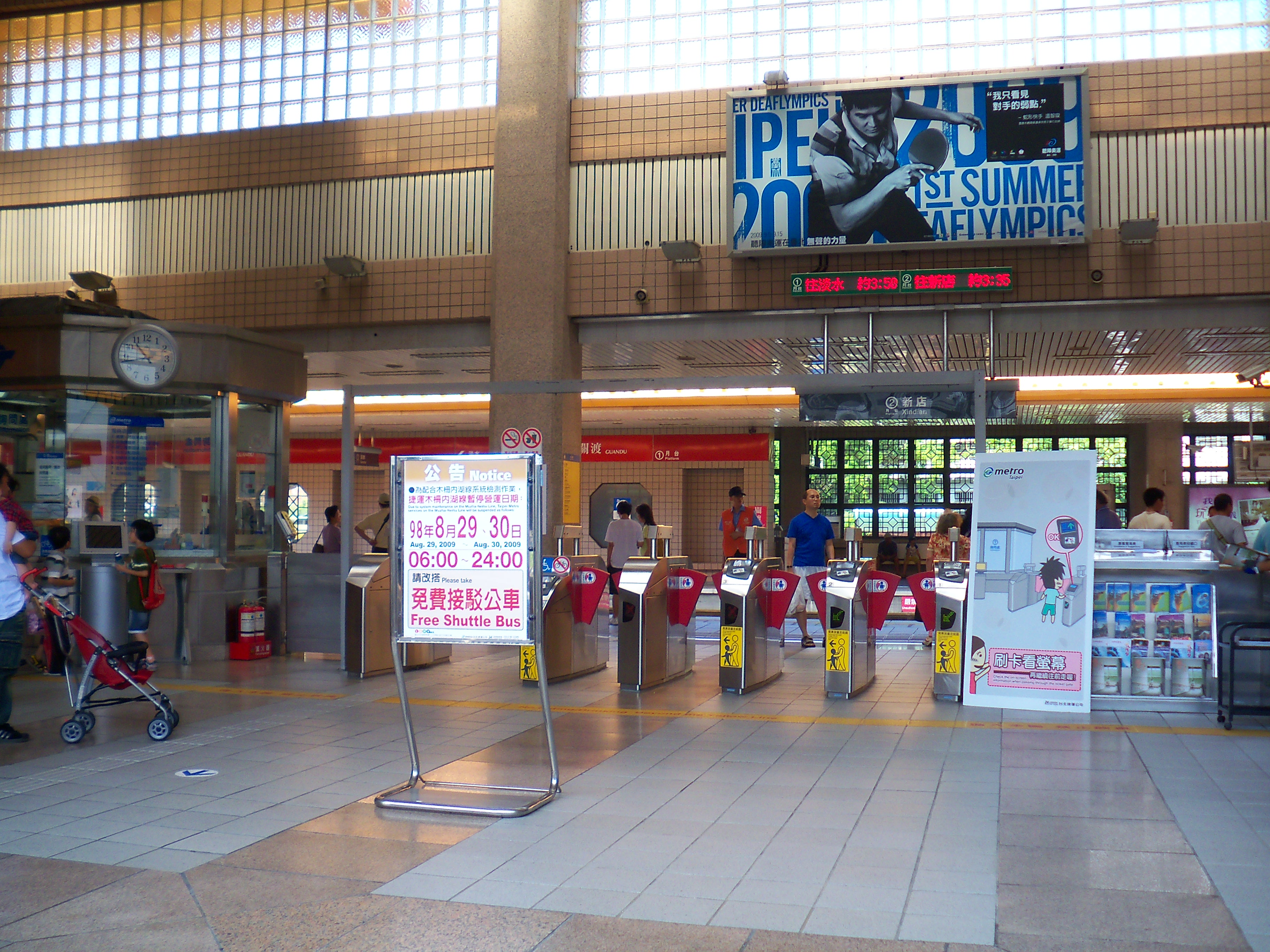
Guandu station concourse

This at-grade, station structure has two side platforms and two exits. The washrooms are inside the entrance area. The station is situated southwest of Guandu Elementary School, between Zhongyang North Road, Dadu Road and Ligong Street.

== History ==
The station was originally opened on 25 December 1901 with the opening of the Tamsui Railroad line as Kantau Station (Japanese: 江頭停車場). After the war it was renamed to Kuantu. On 15 July 1988, this service was discontinued and the station was closed; it was re-opened on 28 March 1997.

The five millionth EasyCard was sold at Guandu station on 7 February 2005.

== Station layout ==
2F	Connecting level	Skyway for platform connection
Street level
Street level	Side platform, doors will open on the right
Street level	Platform 1	← Tamsui–Xinyi line toward Tamsui (R26 Zhuwei)
Street level	Platform 2	→ Tamsui–Xinyi line toward Xiangshan (R24 Zhongyi) →
Street level	Side platform, doors will open on the right
Street level	Concourse (to Platform 2)
Street level	Concourse (to Platform 2)	Entrance/exit, lobby, information desk, automatic ticket dispensing machines, one-way faregates Restrooms, shops

== First and last train timings ==
The first and last train timings at Guandu station are as follows:

Destination	First train		Last train
Destination	Mon − Fri	Sat − Sun and P.H.	Daily
Tamsui–Xinyi line
R28 Tamsui	06:04	06:04	01:07
R01guangci/fengtian palace station	06:08	06:08	00:23

== Around the station ==
- Guandu Nature Park
- Guandu Temple
- Tittot Glass Art Museum
