= Xiangshan station =

Xiangshan station can refer to the following stations:

== Stations in Taiwan ==
- Xiangshan metro station (象山站), a MRT station in Taipei
- Xiangshan railway station (香山站), a TRA station in Hsinchu

== Stations in China ==
- Fragrant Hills station (Beijing Subway) (香山站), a light rail station in the Beijing Subway, also known as Xiangshan station in Chinese
- Taihu Xiangshan station (太湖香山站), a station on Line 5 of the Suzhou Metro
- Xiangshan Campus, China Academy of Art station (美院象山站), a station on Line 6 of the Hangzhou Metro
- Xiangshan station (Guangzhou Metro), a station under construction on the Southern extension of Line 18 of Guangzhou Metro, located in Zhongshan City, Guangdong Province, China

== See also ==
- Xiangshan (disambiguation)
