= Taipei 101/World Trade Center metro station =

Metro station in Taipei, Taiwan

Taipei 101/World Trade Center 台北101/世貿
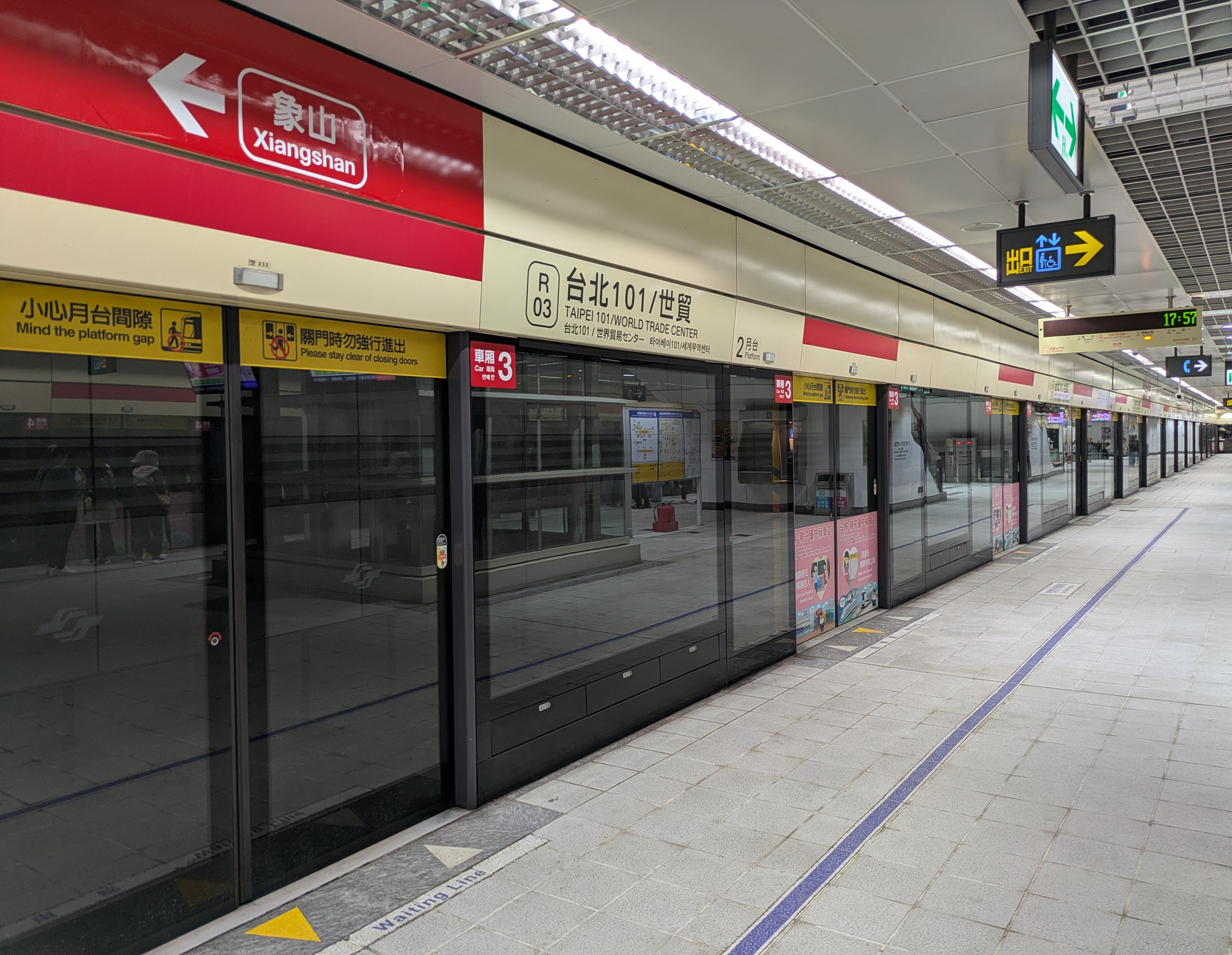
- Platform

Chinese name
- Traditional Chinese: 台北101/世貿
- Simplified Chinese: 台北101/世贸
Transcriptions
Standard Mandarin
- Hanyu Pinyin: Táiběi Yīlíngyī/Shìmào
- Bopomofo: ㄊㄞˊ ㄅㄟˇ ㄧ ㄌㄧㄥˊ ㄧ/ㄕˋ ㄇㄠˋ
- Wade–Giles: T'ai^{2}-pei^{3} Yi^{1}-ling^{2}-yi^{1}/Shih^{4}-mao^{4}
Hakka
- Pha̍k-fa-sṳ: Thòi-pet Yit-làng-yit/Sṳ-meu
Southern Min
- Tâi-lô: Tâi-pak It-khòng-it/Sè-bōo

General information
- Location: B1F 20 Sec 5 Xinyi Rd; Xinyi District, Taipei; Taiwan
- Coordinates: 25.0330°N 121.5628°E
- System: Taipei metro station

Construction
- Structure type: Underground
- Cycle facilities: Access available

Other information
- Station code: R03
- Website: english.metro.taipei/cp.aspx?n=1BE0AF76C79F9A38

History
- Opened: 24 November 2013

Passengers
- 2024: 77,234 daily (December 2024)
- Rank: (Ranked 9 of 119)

Services
Preceding station	Taipei Metro	Following station
Xiangshan towards Guangci/Fengtian Temple	Tamsui–Xinyi Line	Xinyi Anhe towards Tamsui
Location

Taipei 101/World Trade Center (Chinese: 台北101/世貿; pinyin: Táiběi Yīlíngyī/Shìmào) is a metro station in Taipei, Taiwan served by Taipei Metro. It is a station on the Tamsui–Xinyi Line. Near this station are Taipei 101, Taipei World Trade Center and Taipei International Convention Center. It is part of the city center of the capital Taipei. The station number is R03.

== Station overview ==
The station is situated under Xinyi Road, near Shifu Road. It is a two-level, underground station structure with one island platform and five exits. The northeast exit directly connects to the basement of Taipei 101.

Originally, the station was to be named just "World Trade Center". However, since both Taipei 101 and the Taipei World Trade Center represent national landmarks, on 22 July 2011, the Department of Rapid Transit Systems announced that the station would be renamed to Taipei 101/World Trade Center.

=== Construction ===
The station is 185 m (607 ft) long and 25 m (82 ft) wide. Excavation depth is at 22 m (72 ft). The station has a 154 m (505 ft)-long crossover section. It has five entrances, three elevators for the disabled and two vent shafts.

=== Public art ===
The theme for this station is "Modern melody - creation of a spatial atmosphere for dialoguing with the world". The district represents an international exchange between Taiwan and the world. Public art will represent the rapid broadcast of information and the crowd's busy interaction.

== Station layout ==
Street level	Entrance/exit	Entrance/exit
B1	Concourse	Lobby, information desk, automatic ticketing dispensing machines, one-way faregates Restrooms (Inside fare zone, outside fare zone near exit 5)
B1	Concourse	Exit 4 passageway toward Taipei 101 basement
B2	Platform 1	← Tamsui–Xinyi line toward Tamsui (R04 Xinyi Anhe)
B2	Island platform, doors will open on the left
B2	Platform 2	→ Tamsui–Xinyi line toward Guangci/Fengtian Temple (R02 Xiangshan) →

== Notable landmarks ==
- Taipei 101 (exit 4)
- Taipei World Trade Center (exit 1)
  - TWTC International Trade Building
  - Taipei International Convention Center
- Grand Hyatt Taipei
- Taipei Medical University
- Xinyi Sports Center
- Xinyi Elementary School (exit 3)

== First and last train timings ==
The first and last train timings at Taipei 101/World Trade Center station are as follows:

Destination	First train		Last train
Destination	Mon − Fri	Sat − Sun and P.H.	Daily
Tamsui–Xinyi Line
R28 Tamsui	06:05	06:05	00:05
R01 Guangci/Fengtian Temple	06:04	06:04	01:13
