= Zhongyi metro station =

Metro station in Taipei, Taiwan

Zhongyi 忠義
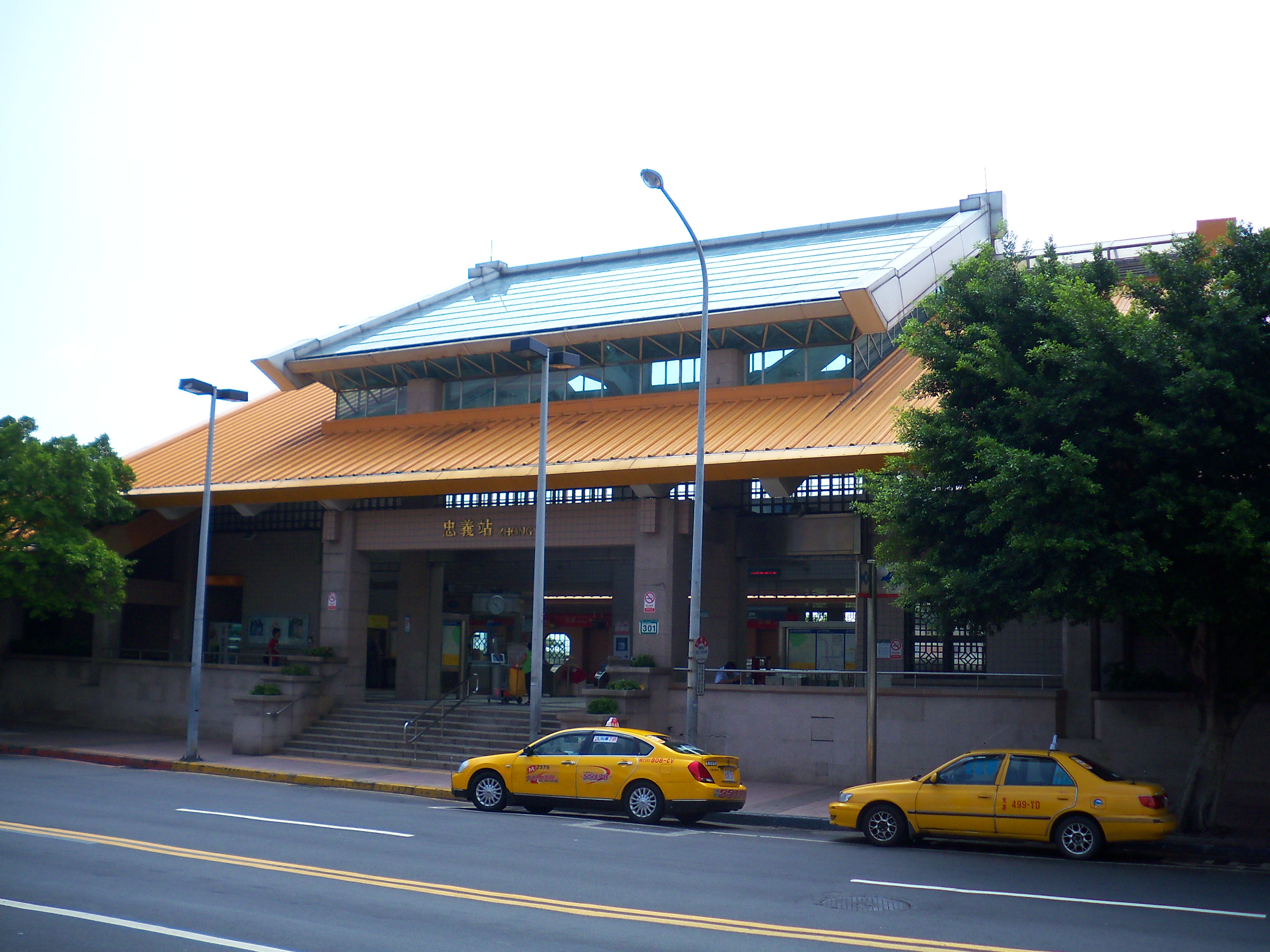
- Zhongyi station concourse

Chinese name
- Traditional Chinese: 忠義
- Simplified Chinese: 忠义
Transcriptions
Standard Mandarin
- Hanyu Pinyin: Zhōngyì
- Bopomofo: ㄓㄨㄥ 一ˋ
- Wade–Giles: Chung^{1}-i^{4}
Hakka
- Pha̍k-fa-sṳ: Chûng-ngi
Southern Min
- Tâi-lô: Tiong-gī

General information
- Location: No. 301, Zhongyang North Road, Sec. 4 Beitou, Taipei; Taiwan
- Coordinates: 25.131221°N 121.473422°E
- Operator: Taipei Metro
- Line: Tamsui–Xinyi line
- Connections: Bus stop

Construction
- Structure type: At-grade

Other information
- Station code: R24

History
- Opened: 28 March 1997

Passengers
- daily (December 2024)
- Rank: 107 out of 109

Services
Preceding station	Taipei Metro	Following station
Fuxinggang towards Xiangshan	Tamsui–Xinyi line	Guandu towards Tamsui
Location

The Taipei Metro Zhongyi station (formerly transliterated as Chungyi Station until 2003) is located in Beitou District, Taipei. Taiwan. It is a station on the Tamsui–Xinyi line. In the past, the station belonged to the now-defunct TRA Tamsui line.

== Station overview ==
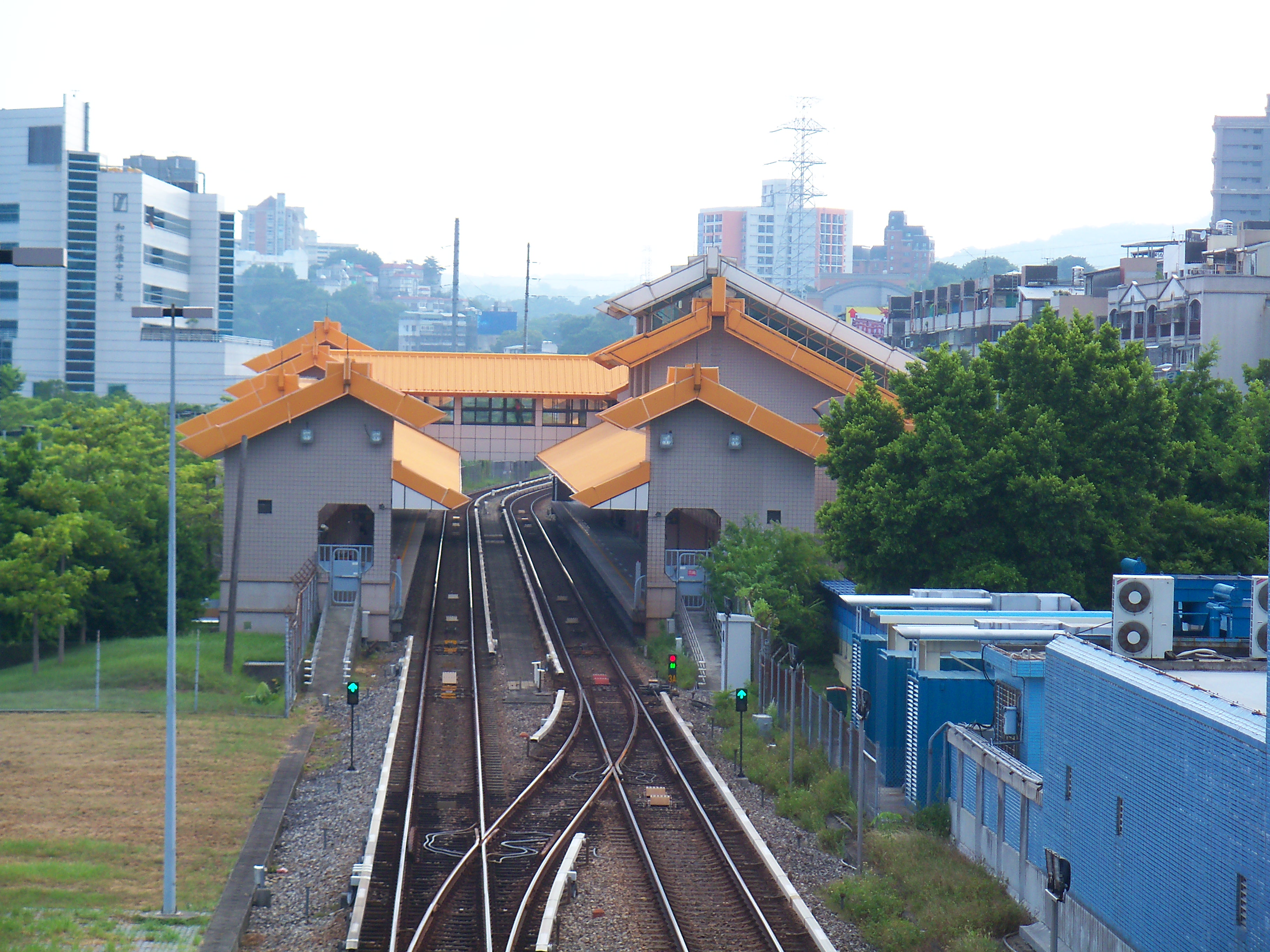
Zhongyi station from the southwest

This at-grade station structure has two side platforms and two exits. It is located on the south of Zhongyang North Road. The washrooms are inside the entrance area.

== History ==
This station was built on 1 November 1961, and was replaced by the request station on 1 July 1979. It was closed from 15 July 1988 to 28 March 1997.

== Station layout ==
2F	Connecting level	Skyway for platform connection
Street level
Street level	Concourse (toward platform 1)
Street level	Concourse (toward platform 1)	Entrance/exit, lobby, information desk, entrance/exit, automatic ticket dispensing machines, one-way faregates Restrooms
Street level	Side platform, doors will open on the right
Street level	Platform 1	← Tamsui–Xinyi line toward Tamsui (R25 Guandu)
Street level	Platform 2	→ Tamsui–Xinyi line toward Xiangshan (R23 Fuxinggang) →
Street level	Side platform, doors will open on the right

== Around the station ==
- Taipei City University of Science and Technology
