= Taipei Metro C301 =

Electric multiple unit used on the Taipei Metro

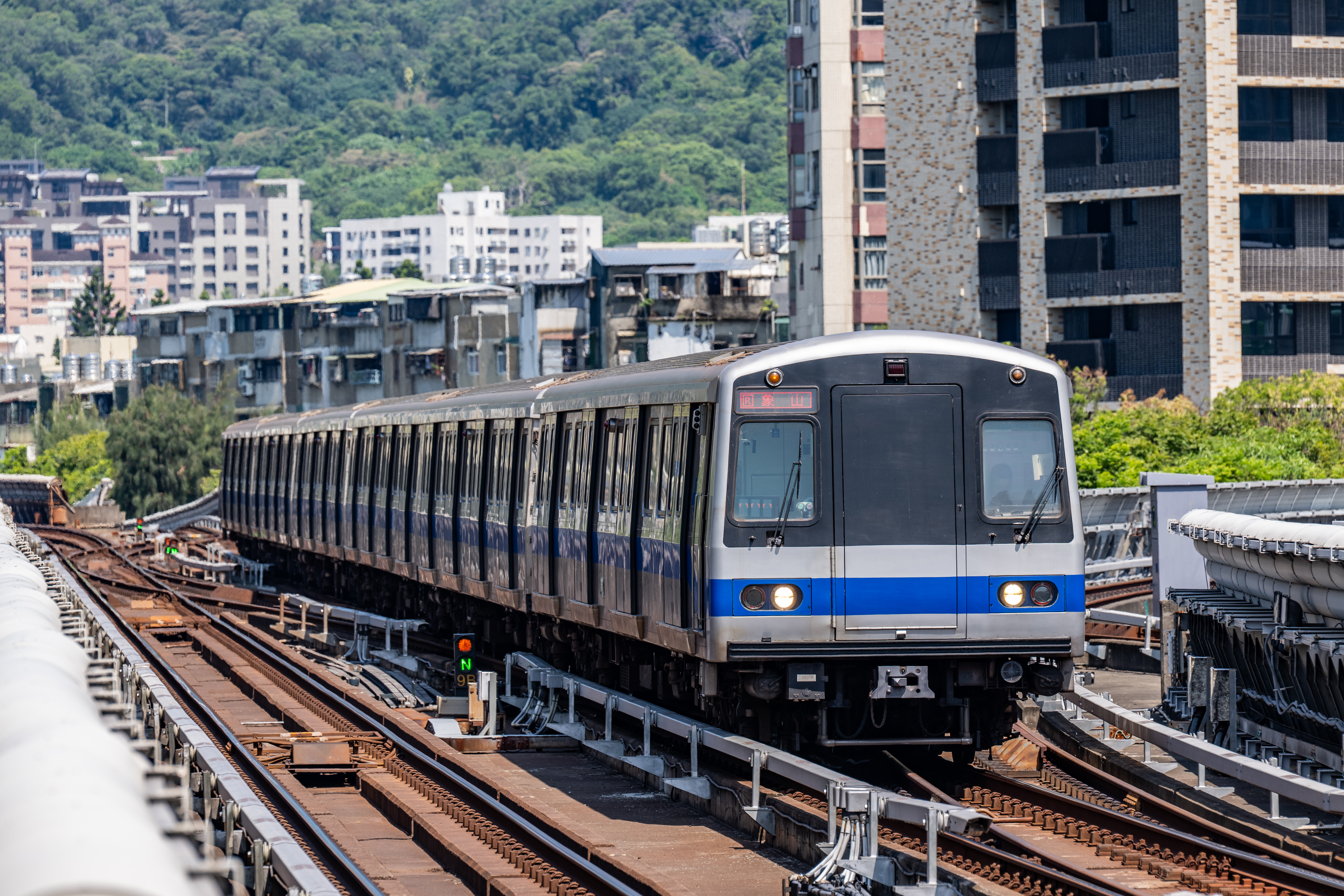
- A Taipei Metro C301 train on the Tamsui–Xinyi line.

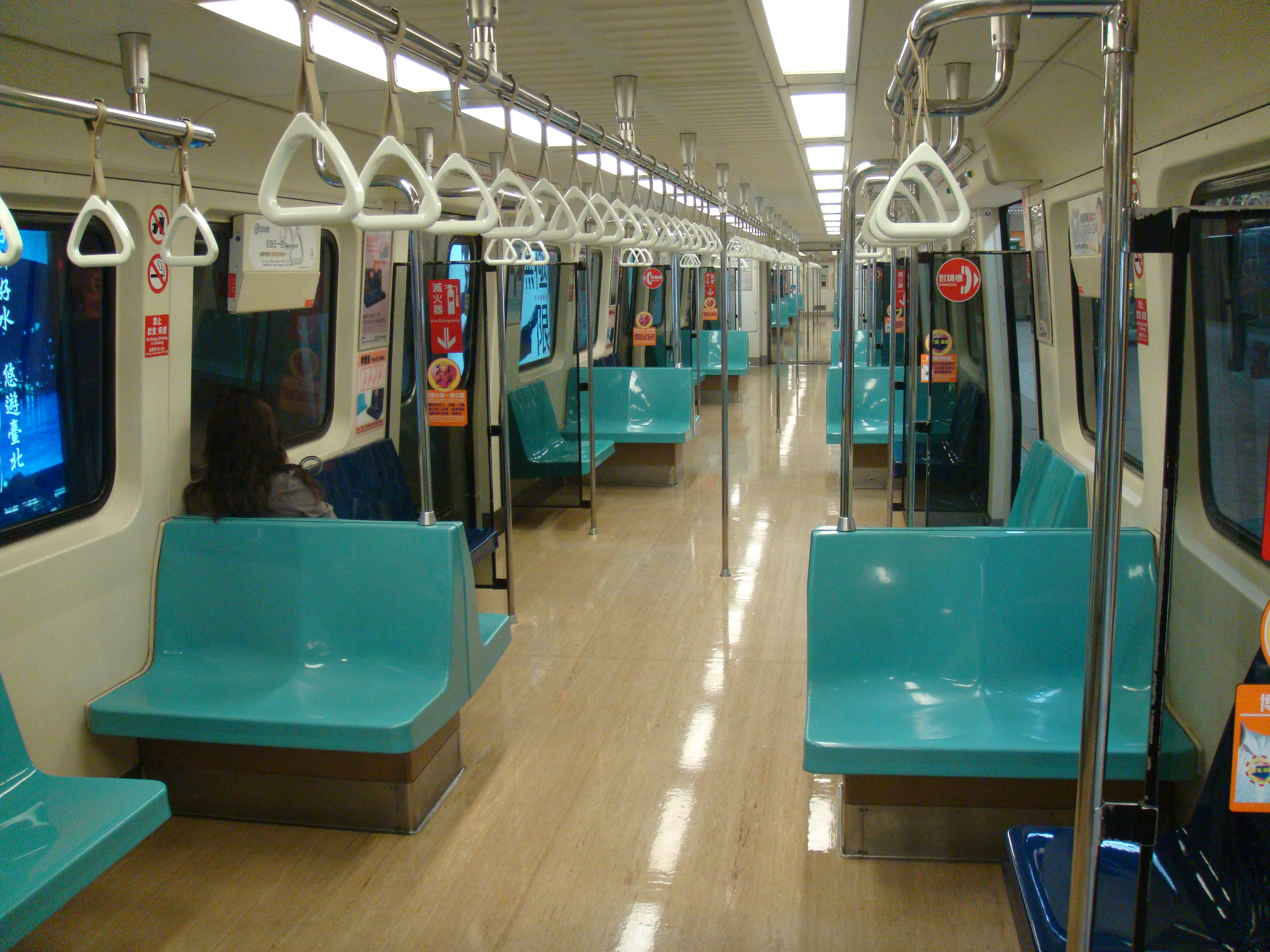
- Interior design of the (unrefurbished) motor car of a C301 train
- In service: 1997–present
- Manufacturers: Kawasaki, Union Rail Car Partnership
- Built at: Kobe, Hyōgo, Japan (Kawasaki) and Yonkers, New York, USA (URC)
- Constructed: 1992–1994
- Entered service: 28 March 1997
- Refurbished: 2011–2019
- Number built: 132 vehicles (22 sets)
- Successor: Hyundai Rotem CR381A
- Formation: 6-car sets DM1–T–M2+M2–T–DM1
- Fleet numbers: 001/002–043/044
- Capacity: 1914 passengers
- Operator: Taipei Rapid Transit Corporation
- Depot: Beitou
- Line served: Tamsui–Xinyi Line

Specifications
- Car body construction: Stainless steel
- Train length: 141 m (462 ft 7 in)
- Car length: 23.5 m (77 ft 1 in)
- Width: 3.18 m (10 ft 5 in)
- Height: 3,585 mm (11 ft 9.1 in)
- Maximum speed: 90 km/h (56 mph) (design); 80 km/h (50 mph) (service)
- Weight: 39.5 t (38.9 long tons; 43.5 short tons) (DM1/M2); 34 t (33 long tons; 37 short tons) (T)
- Traction system: AEG/Westinghouse GTO–VVVF (as built); Bombardier MITRAC TC1410 IGBT–VVVF (after refurbishment)
- Traction motors: 4 × 145 kW (194 hp) 3-phase AC Induction motor
- Power output: 2.32 MW (3,110 hp)
- Acceleration: 1 m/s^{2} (2.2 mph/s)
- Deceleration: 1 m/s^{2} (2.2 mph/s) (service); 1.3 m/s^{2} (2.9 mph/s) (emergency)
- Electric systems: 750 V DC third rail
- Current collection: Contact shoe
- UIC classification: Bo′Bo′+2′2′+Bo′Bo′+Bo′Bo′+2′2′+Bo′Bo′
- Bogies: Bolsterless bogies
- Braking systems: Regenerative and disc brakes
- Safety systems: ATC/ATO, ATS
- Coupling system: Tomlinson
- Track gauge: 1,435 mm (4 ft 8 1/2 in) standard gauge

The Taipei Metro C301 is the first generation of heavy-capacity electric multiple units on the Taipei Metro in Taipei, Taiwan. Built by Kawasaki Heavy Industries and Union Rail Car Partnership between 1992 and 1994, it was introduced on the Tamsui line in 1997.

== History ==
Following the approval of the Taipei Mass Rapid Transit Project by the Executive Yuan in 1986, a contract of 800 metro cars worth $1 billion – 200 of which were for the new Tamsui-Xindian line and were worth $200 million – was called. This order was believed to receive multiple bids from many companies; two American bidders that stood out were the Union Rail Car Partnership (URC) and the United States Taiwan Transit Group. The latter, a consortium between General Electric, Westinghouse Electric Corporation, General Railway Signal, Pullman and Westinghouse Air Brake Company formed solely to bid for this project, was seeking to supply both the rolling stock and signalling systems to Taipei and proposed to build the trains at Pullman's plant in Barre, Vermont. On the other hand, URC, a joint venture between Kawasaki Rail Car, Nissho Iwai American and its subsidiary North American Transit Corporation, promised that all subsidiary contracting work be done through American source subcontractors, and all construction work be done in the United States, citing the creation of 300 jobs at Kawasaki's Yonkers rail car plant and at least 500 other jobs in the local economy. Such keen American interest in the bid was a result of pressure from the Reagan administration on Taiwan to open up its markets due to the trade surplus Taiwan had with the US by the early 1980s.

In 1988, Taipei officials announced that they would not accept bids from consortia although they were willing to accept URC's bid. Bombardier Transportation, which owned the Pullman factory, had to be the sole representative of the United States Taiwan Transit Group if it was to bid for the rolling stock. Taipei also modified the rolling stock specifications to lower costs. Eventually the next round of bidding had URC emerge as the winning bidder with its bid being lower than that of Bombardier.

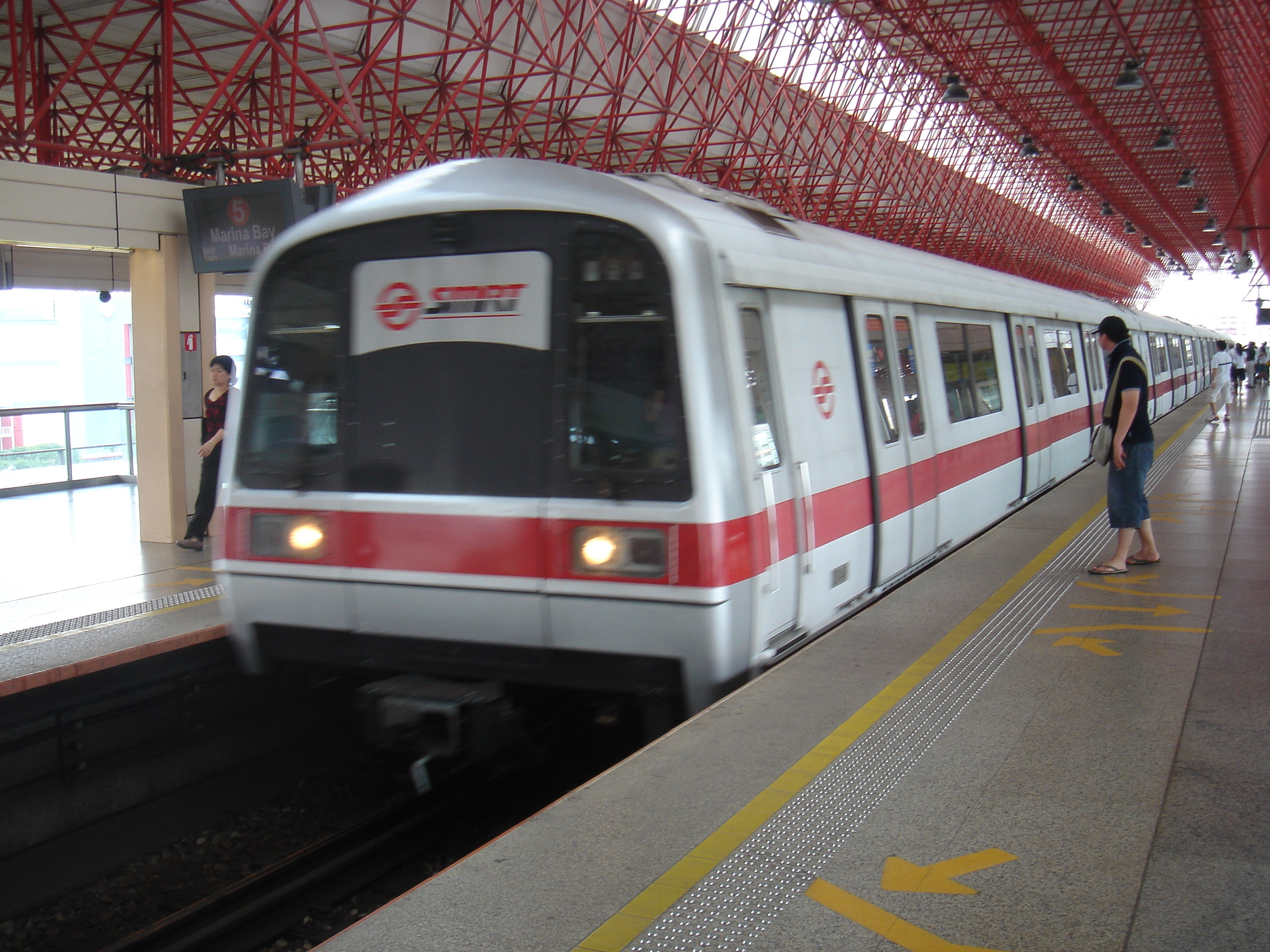
The Singapore MRT C151 was the design basis for the C301 trains.

In the order of the first 132 cars, Kawasaki built the carbody shells in its main rolling stock plant at Hyōgo, Japan and subsequently shipped them to Port Elizabeth, New Jersey. URC performed the final assembly of the trains through assembly of the bogies and installation of brakes, propulsion and air-conditioning systems, along with the seats, vertical poles and other interior equipment into the carbody at the 150,000-square-foot (13,935 m^{2}) Yonkers Plant in New York. Due to the new specifications set by the Taipei officials for rolling stock, the trains shared a very similar design as C151 trains on the Singapore MRT that Kawasaki had previously built from 1986 to 1989.

Despite the promising prospects of the Taipei rolling stock contract for URC, URC was not successful in securing the contract of the next batch of 216 cars; this contract was instead awarded to Siemens of Germany. Reasons cited by Taipei's Department of Rapid Transit Systems (DORTS) for this decision was concern that URC might be just a front for a Japanese company. This became a point of contention in Yonkers, which had a 7.5% unemployment rate in May 1993, as the manufacturing sector in the United States was facing a decline. Although US officials tried to convince DORTS to reverse this decision, it was presumably unsuccessful.

== Overview ==
The C301 is built with stainless steel carbody and is hence unpainted save for a blue stripe running across the train exterior and the DORTS logo. The front profile of the C301, as compared to the later Siemens-built cars, is curved as opposed to being straight. The train uses pneumatically-controlled doors and features a round door opening indicator. To inform passengers of the direction of the train service, LED displays that display the terminus of the train service are also mounted on the side windows.

The undercarriage of the C301 features bolsterless bogies and a variable-frequency traction control with AC motors; the latter was originally from Westinghouse Electric Corporation using GTO thyristor technology. During the 2013-2017 refurbishment, the VVVF inverters were replaced by MITRAC TC1410 inverters from Bombardier Transportation using IGBT technology.

== Deployments ==
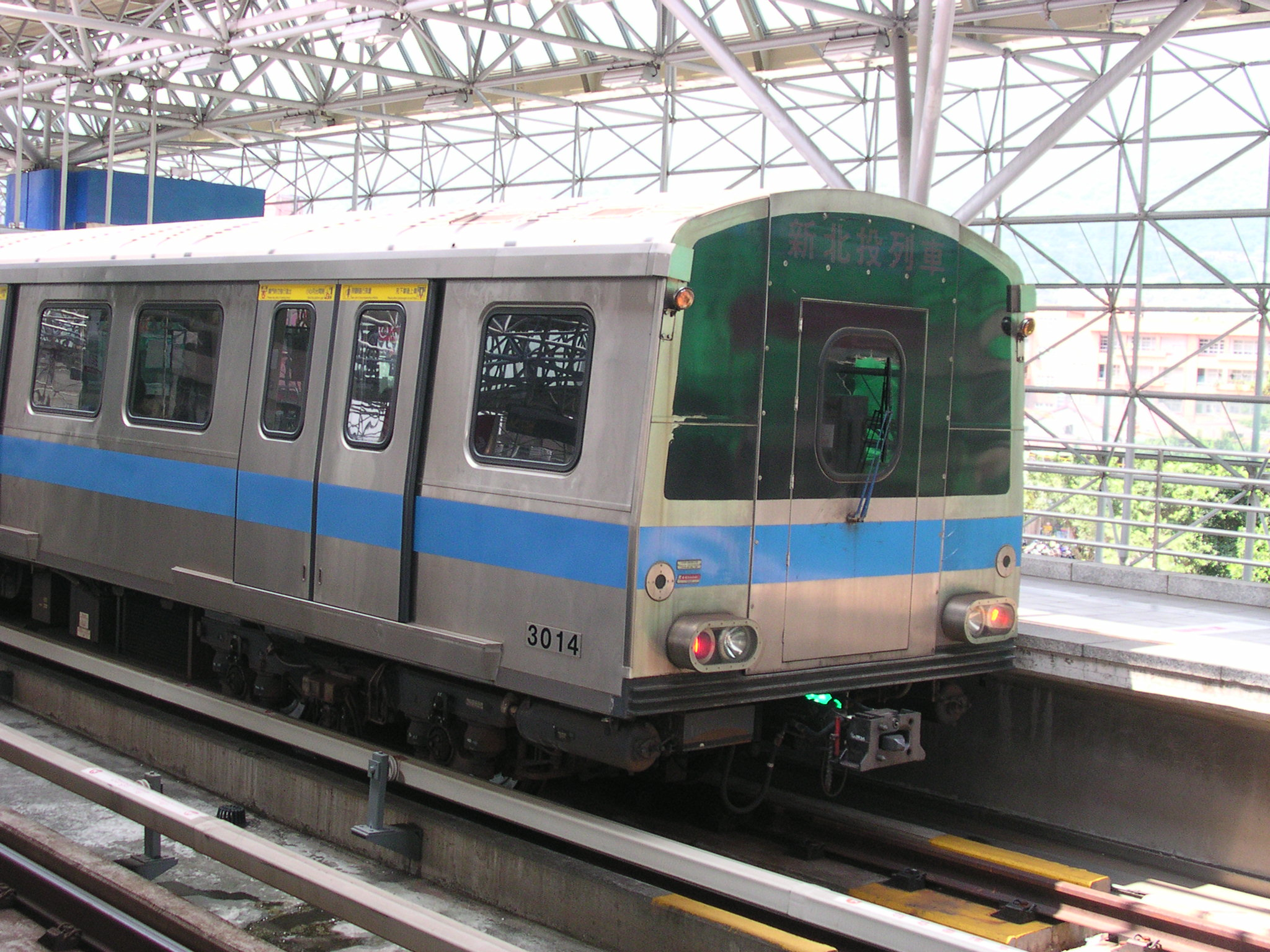
Train set 014 on the Xinbeitou branch line before 2006.

In the initial period of operations, the C301 operated on Tamsui-Xindian and Beitou-Nanshijiao routes via Chiang Kai-shek Memorial Hall and Guting. Following the opening of the new Dongmen station in 2012, the Beitou-Nanshijiao route was amended to become Beitou-Taipower Building route and the use of the C301 on the Zhonghe Line was discontinued; this route was again modified with the opening of the Xinyi Line and instead terminated at Xiangshan and C301 trains stopped terminating at Taipower Building. Trainsets 001/002 and 011/012 performed the final departures on the Beitou-Nanshijiao route and trainsets 007/008 and 019/020 performed the final departures on the Beitou-Taipower Building route.

With the opening of the Songshan Line in 2014, the Tamsui-Xindian route was withdrawn and the C301 trains are now confined to the Tamsui-Xinyi Line. Trainsets 027/028 and 037/038 performed the final departures on the Tamsui-Xindian route on 15 November 2014.

Train set 013/014 had been previously split and modified to serve as 3-car formations on the Xinbeitou branch line. When new 3-car formation C371 cars were introduced, train set 013/014 was subsequently re-joined and put back into normal service on Tamsui–Xinyi line from 22 July 2006 onward.

== Train formation ==
A complete six-car trainset consists of an identical twin set of one driving motor car (DM1), one trailer car (T) and one intermediate motor car (M2) permanently coupled together. The configuration of a C301 trainset in revenue service is DM1–T–M2–M2–T–DM1.

Each car is assigned its own four-digit serial number, which ranges from x001 to x044.

- The first digit (the 'x' above) indicates the position of the car. Hence, DM1 cars use the number x=1, T cars x=2, and M2 cars x=3
- The other three digits are the identification number of the train the car is part of. A full-length train of six cars consists of two identification numbers, one for the first three cars, and another for the second three. The bigger number is always equal to the smaller number plus one, and the smaller number is always an odd number. For example, a train of six cars would have serial numbers 1001, 2001, 3001, 3002, 2002, and 1002, respectively.
- Taipei Metro names train set numbers such as 01/02, 03/04, etc. instead of 001/002, 003/004, etc. (The numbers on the stickers near the driver's doors are only 2 digits long.)

== Refurbishment ==
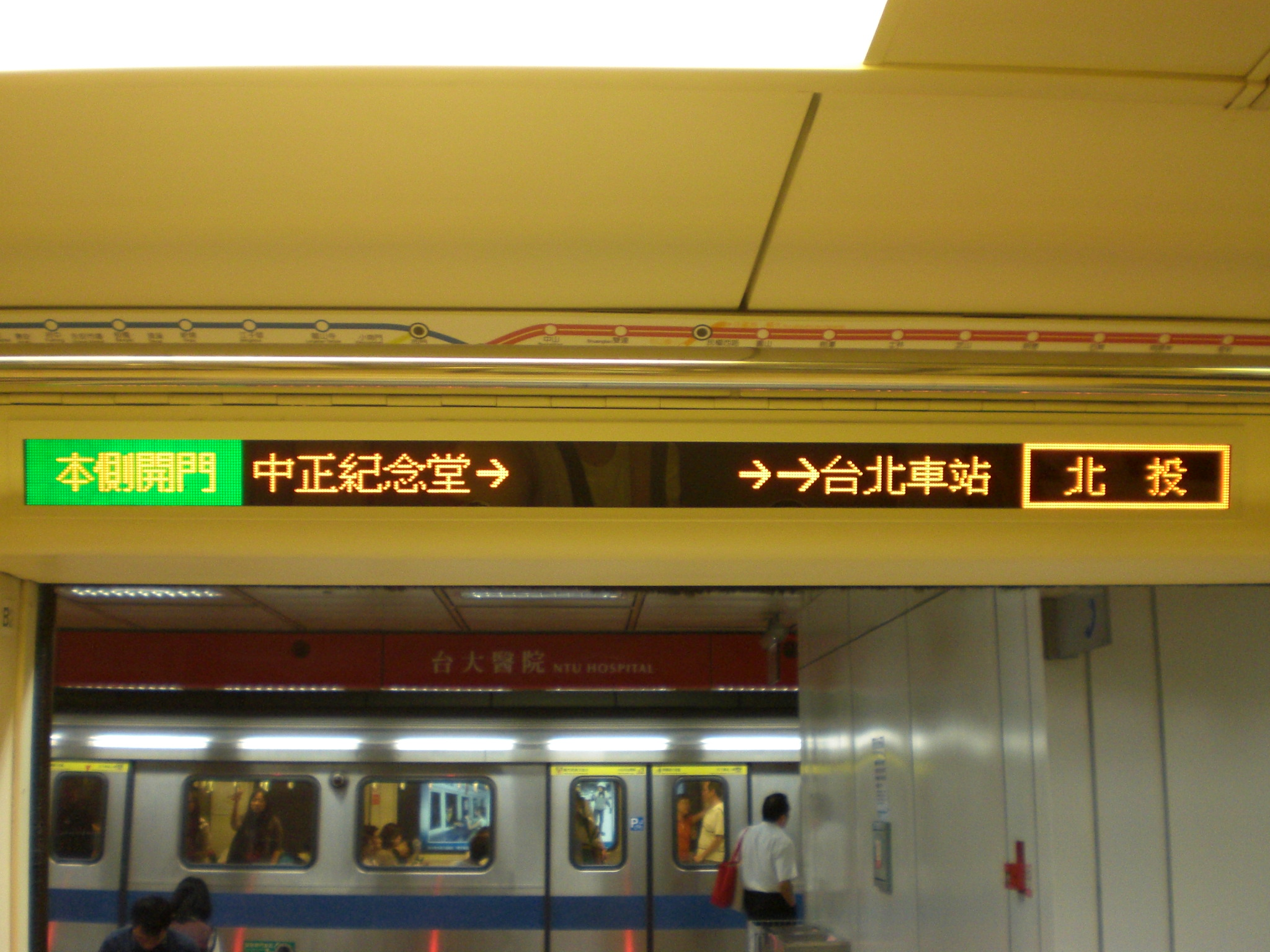
A new full-colour LED display above the doors of a refurbished C301

From 2011 to 2012, the C301 cars underwent refurbishment, and were fitted with new air-conditioning, surveillance, and fire detection systems. The original wood-style flooring was replaced with mostly white flooring, and the previously red LED in-train information systems were replaced with new LED in-train information systems. The first 11 C301 trains also received new IGBT–VVVF inverters from Bombardier Transportation in 2013.

Train set 013/014 had been previously split and modified to serve as 3-car formations on the Xinbeitou branch line. When new 3-car formation C371 cars were made, train set 013/014 was subsequently re-joined and put back into normal service on Tamsui–Xinyi line. Train set 013/014 was also the first to equip IGBT–VVVF inverters.

In 2017, the latter 11 sets got fitted with IGBT–VVVF inverters, effectively phasing out all GTO–VVVF inverters.

== Replacement ==
As of 2026, due to aging and no life extension planned during the refurbishment, Taipei Metro Expects to replace the aging C301 units with the newer Hyundai Rotem CR381As.

== See also ==
- Kawasaki Heavy Industries C151 - the design basis of the C301
- Taipei Metro VAL256
- Taipei Metro C321
- Taipei Metro C341
- Taipei Metro C371
- Taipei Metro BT370
- Taipei Metro C381
- T series (Toronto subway), with similar Westinghouse GTO-VVVF motors.
