= 甲山 =

甲山 may refer to:

- Mount Kabuto, Nishinomiya, Hyōgo, Japan
- Kōzan, Hiroshima, former town in Sera District, Hiroshima Prefecture, Japan
- Kapsan County, Ryanggang Province, North Korea
- Jiashan Township, Jilin, in Dongliao County, Jilin, China

== See also ==
- Koyama (disambiguation)
