= Xinyi Anhe metro station =

Metro station in Taipei, Taiwan

Coordinates: 25.0332°N 121.5516°E

Xinyi Anhe 信義安和
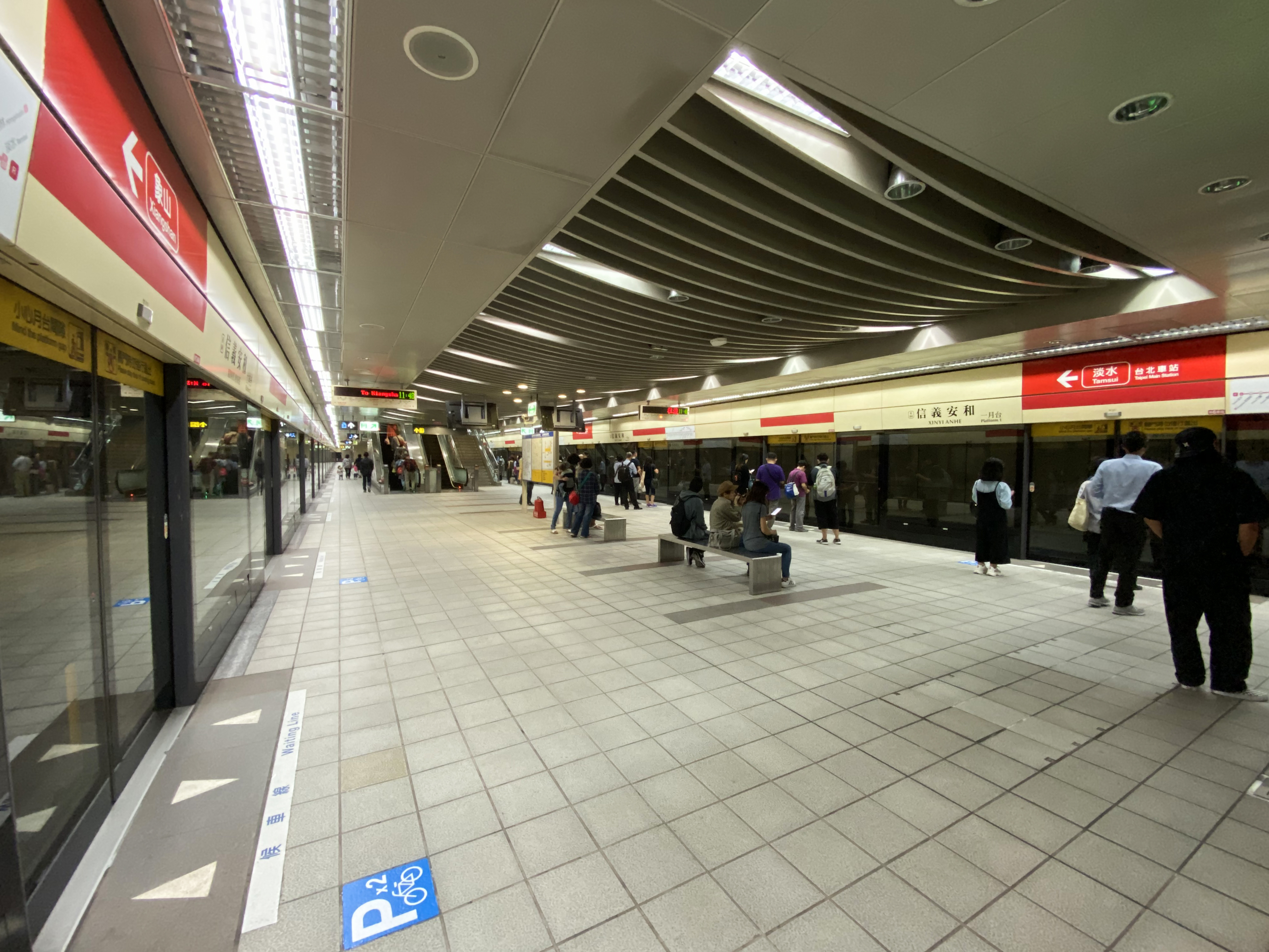
- Platforms

Chinese name
- Traditional Chinese: 信義安和
- Simplified Chinese: 信义安和
Transcriptions
Standard Mandarin
- Hanyu Pinyin: Xìnyì Ānhé
- Wade–Giles: Hsin⁴-i⁴ An¹-hê²
Hakka
- Pha̍k-fa-sṳ: Sin-ngi Ôn-fò
Southern Min
- Tâi-lô: Sìn-gī An-hô

General information
- Location: Xinyi Rd., Sec. 4 Daan, Taipei; Taiwan
- Operator: Taipei Metro
- Line: Tamsui–Xinyi line (R04)
- Platforms: 2 (island platform)

Construction
- Structure type: Underground
- Platform levels: 3

History
- Opened: 24 November 2013

Passengers
- daily (December 2024) (Ranked of 119)

Services
Preceding station	Taipei Metro	Following station
Taipei 101-World Trade Center towards Guangci/Fengtian Temple	Tamsui–Xinyi Line	Daan towards Tamsui
Location

The Taipei Metro Xinyi Anhe station is a station on the Red Line located beneath Xinyi Rd., Sec. 4 at the intersection of Xinyi Rd., Sec. 4 and Anhe Rd. in Daan District, Taipei, Taiwan. The station was opened on 24 November 2013.

== History ==
Originally, the station was to be named "Anhe Road Station". The construction of the station began in July 2005. However, the Department of Rapid Transit Systems felt that the name was too broad. Thus, on 22 July 2011, it was announced that the station would be renamed "Xinyi Anhe station" to more accurately describe its location.

The station is 210 m (690 ft) long and 30 m (98 ft) meters in wide. Excavation depth is at 22 m (72 ft) meters. It has five entrances, two elevators for the disabled and two vent shafts. One of the entrances will be integrated into a joint development building.

=== Public art ===
The design theme for the station is "Life melody - creation of a spatial atmosphere of a refined metropolitan lifestyle".

== Station layout ==
Street level	Entrance/exit	Entrance/exit
B1	Concourse	Lobby, information desk, automatic ticketing dispensing machines, one-way faregates Restrooms (Inside fare zone, outside fare zone near exit 5)
B2	Platform 1	← Tamsui–Xinyi line toward Tamsui (R05 Daan)
B2	Island platform, doors will open on the left
B2	Platform 2	→ Tamsui–Xinyi line toward Guangci/Fengtian Temple (R03 Taipei 101/World Trade Center) →

== Around the station ==
- Taipei Film Commission

== First and last train timings ==
The first and last train timings at Xinyi Anhe station are as follows:

Destination	First train		Last train
Destination	Mon − Fri	Sat − Sun and P.H.	Daily
Tamsui–Xinyi line
R28 Tamsui	06:04	06:04	00:04
R01 Guangci/Fengtian Temple	06:02	06:02	01:11

== See also ==
- List of railway stations in Taiwan
