= Guandu Nature Park =

Park in Beitou, Taipei, Taiwan

- Kuantu Nature Park
- 關渡自然公園
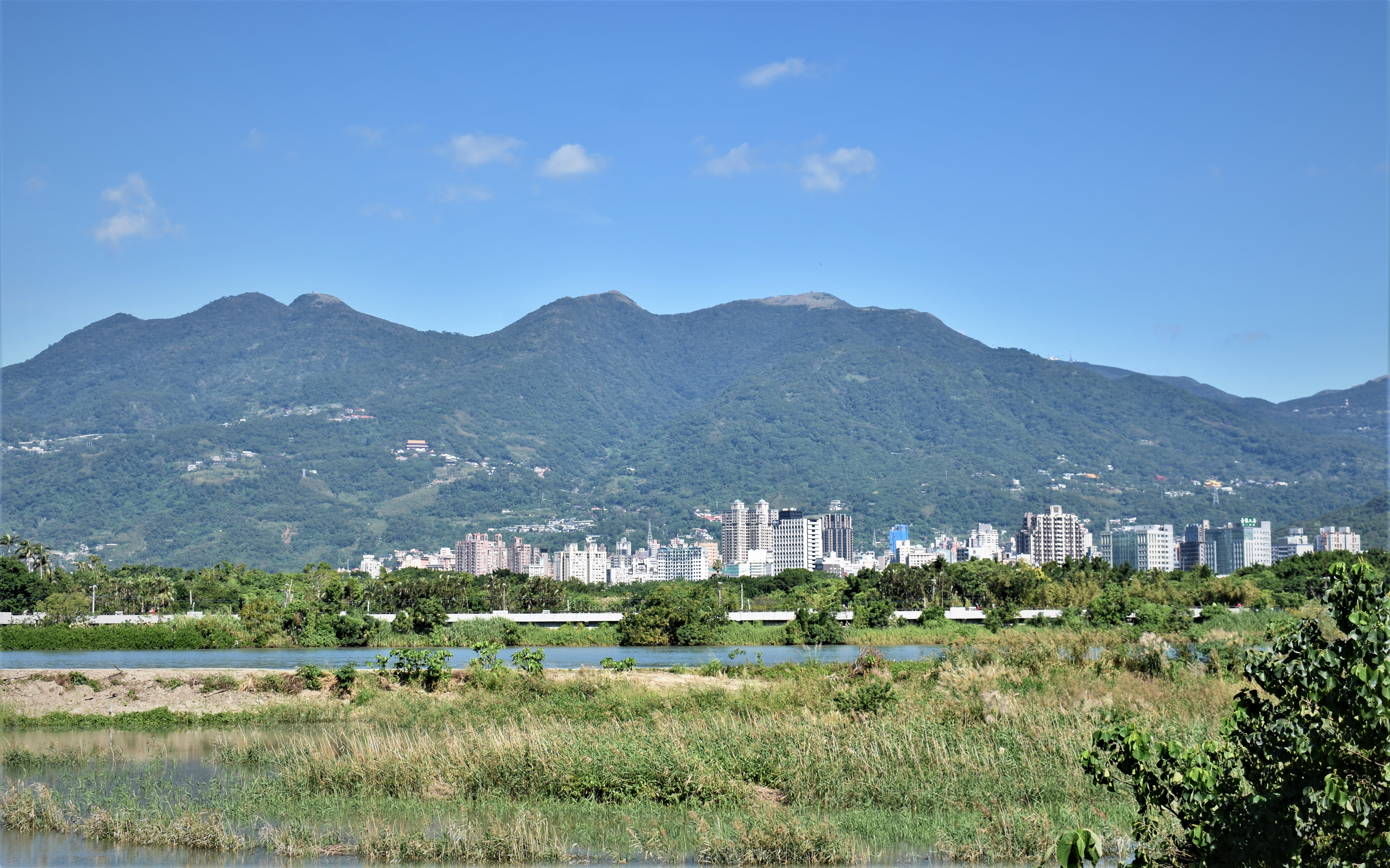
- Interactive map of Guandu Nature Park
- Type: park
- Location: Beitou, Taipei, Taiwan
- Coordinates: 25°07′08.8″N 121°28′15.3″E
- Area: 57 hectares (140 acres)
- Opening: 2001
- Manager: Jeff Yeh (Director)
- Operator: Wild Bird Society of Taipei
- Public transit: Guandu Station
- Website: Official website

Guandu Nature Park, also known as Kuantu Nature Park, (traditional Chinese: 關渡自然公園; simplified Chinese: 关渡自然公园; pinyin: Guāndù Zìrán Gōngyuán) is a park in Beitou District, Taipei, Taiwan.

== History ==
The wetland within the area was saved from being turned into a stadium in 1996 due to the protest from civic groups. After 10 years of planning, the nature park was established in 2001. On 1 December 2001, the Taipei City Government trusted the Wild Bird Society of Taipei to manage the park. On 2 February 2015, Legislative Yuan lawmakers toured the area after the successful passing of Wetlands Conservation Act to commemorate its achievement.

== Geology ==
The park spans over an area of 57 hectares in a low-laying area of Taipei Basin at the junction of Keelung River and Tamsui River. It is divided into four areas, namely main area, core reserve area, outdoor observational area and sustainable management area. The park primarily consists of freshwater ponds, brackish ponds, swamps, rice fields and mounds.

== Ecology ==
The park is home to more than 830 animal species and around 230 bird species have been observed in the area. This wetland is categorized as an Important Bird Area by BirdLife International.

== Facilities ==
The park features wooden trails, bird watching pavilions, nature center etc. The 2-story nature center serves as the information and education center of the park as well as exhibition center, research center and service center. The ground floor consists of auditorium, biological display, presentation room and gift shop. The upper floor consists of bird watching observatory, special exhibition area, classroom and refreshment area. It regularly holds guided tours, multimedia shows, special exhibitions, lectures, tutorials and consultations.

== Events ==
The park regularly holds the annual Taipei International Bird-Watching Fair since 1999 and also the Guandu International Nature Art Festival.

== Transportation ==
The park is accessible with walking distance southeast of Guandu Station of Taipei Metro.

== See also ==
- List of parks in Taiwan
