= Mukaiyama =

Mukaiyama may refer to:

- Mukaiyama aldol addition, an organic reaction
- Mukaiyama hydration, an organic reaction
- Mukaiyama Kofun, a kofun burial mound located in Mie Prefecture, Japan
- Mukaiyama Station, a railway station in Aomori Prefecture, Japan
- Teruaki Mukaiyama (1927–2018), Japanese organic chemist

== See also ==
- 向山 (disambiguation)
