= 向山 =

向山, meaning 'to mountain', may refer to:

- Koyama (disambiguation), Japanese transliteration
- Mukaiyama (disambiguation), Japanese transliteration
- Mukoyama (disambiguation), Japanese transliteration
- Xiangshan (disambiguation), Chinese transliteration
