= Tittot Glass Art Museum =

Museum in Beitou, Taipei, Taiwan

- 琉園水晶博物館
- Established: 1999
- Location: Beitou, Taipei, Taiwan
- Coordinates: 25°07′37″N 121°28′07″E
- Type: museum
- Public transit access: Guandu Station

The Tittot Glass Art Museum (traditional Chinese: 琉園水晶博物館; simplified Chinese: 琉园水晶博物馆; pinyin: Liúyuán Shuǐjīng Bówùguǎn) is a museum about glass art in Beitou District, Taipei, Taiwan. It is the first museum in Taiwan dedicated to glass art.

== History ==
The museum was established in 1999.

== Architecture ==
The museum spans over two floors. The ground floor displays various home-made artifacts and the upper floor displays the history of glass art and live display.

== Transportation ==
The museum is accessible within walking distance northeast from Guandu Station of the Taipei Metro.

== See also ==
- List of museums in Taiwan
