= Chongshan Street Mosque =

Mosque in Guilin, Guangxi, China

- 崇善路清真寺
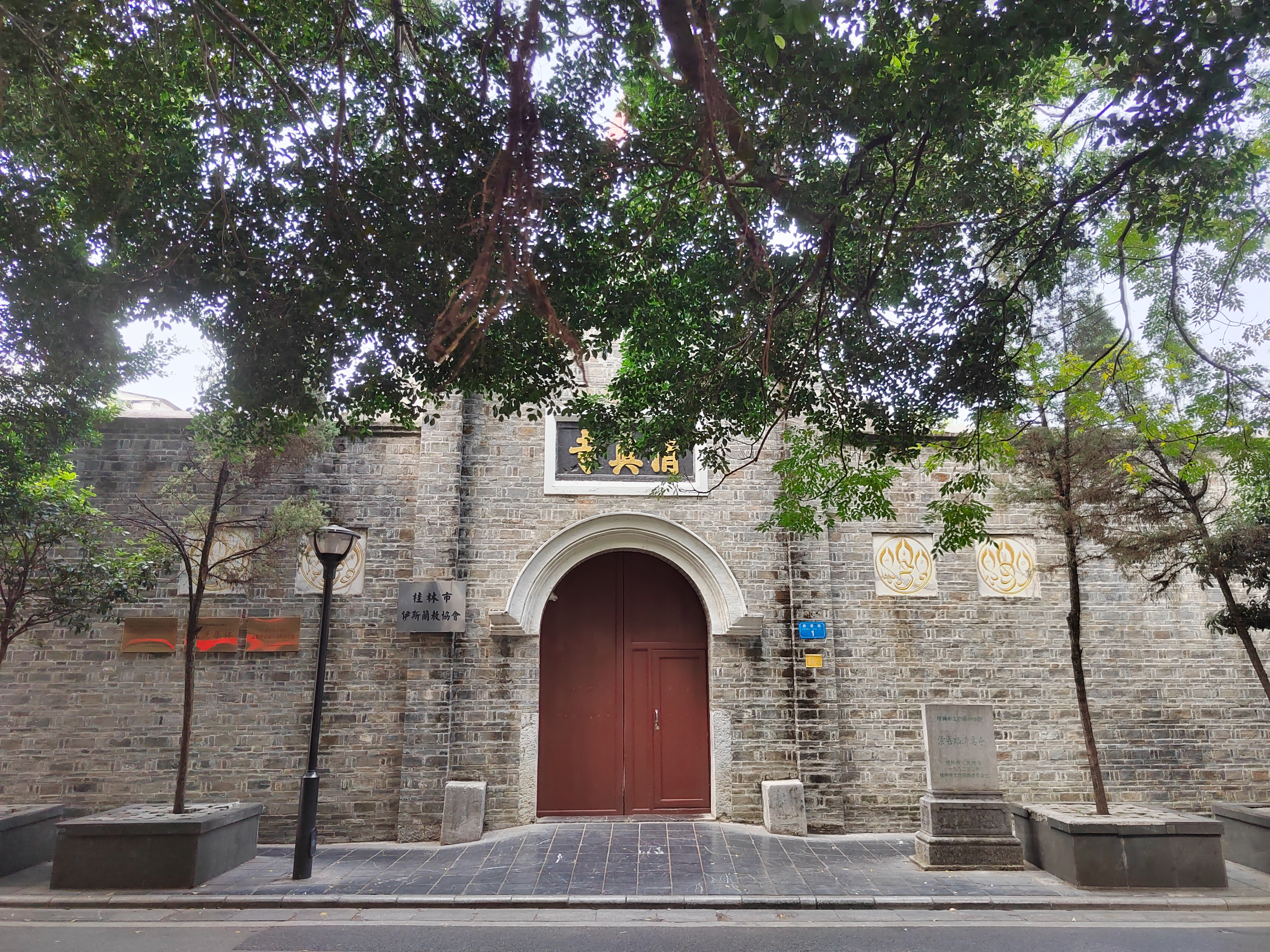

- Location of the mosque in Guangxi

Religion
- Affiliation: Sunni Islam
- Ecclesiastical or organizational status: Mosque
- Status: Active

Location
- Location: 1 Chongshan Street, Xiangshan, Guilin, Guangxi
- Country: China
- Interactive map of Chongshan Street Mosque
- Coordinates: 25°16′20″N 110°17′14″E

Architecture
- Type: Mosque
- Style: Chinese; Islamic
- Established: 1735
- Interior area: 2,000 m^{2} (22,000 sq ft)

Chinese name
- Chinese: 崇善路清真寺
Transcriptions
Standard Mandarin
- Hanyu Pinyin: Chóngshàn Lù Qīngzhēnsì

The Chongshan Street Mosque (Chinese: 崇善路清真寺; pinyin: Chóngshàn Lù Qīngzhēnsì) is a mosque in Xiangshan District, Guilin, in the Guangxi autonomous region of China. It is the largest mosque in Guilin.

== History ==
The mosque was constructed in 1735, during the Yongzheng Emperor (r. 1709–1722) of the Qing dynasty. The mosque was expanded in 1849 and renovated twice during the Daoguang Emperor (r. 1820–1850) and the Republic of China.

== Architecture ==
The mosque spans 2,000 square metres (22,000 sq ft) and was constructed in a mix of the Chinese and Islamic architectural styles. The mosque consists of the main prayer hall, lecture hall, wudu, etc. There are 24 pillars that surround the main prayer hall.

== See also ==
- Islam in China
- List of mosques in China
