= Taipei Film Commission =

Organization based in Da'an, Taipei, Taiwan

- 台北市電影委員會
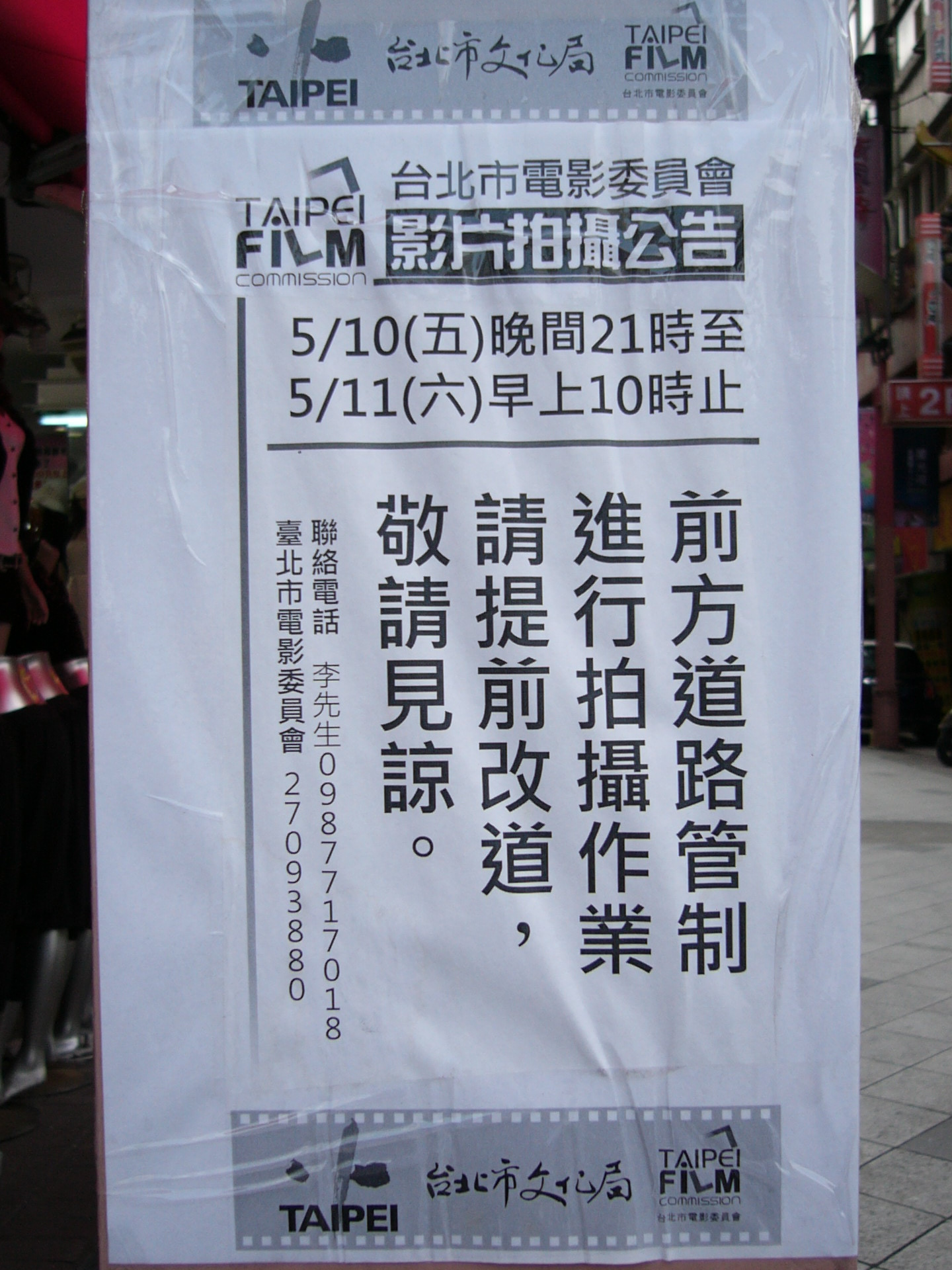
- Formation: 2007
- Headquarters: Da'an, Taipei, Taiwan
- Coordinates: 25°01′53.5″N 121°33′26.1″E
- Chairperson: Tsai Tsung-hsiung
- Vice Chairperson: Jennifer Jao
- Parent organization: Department of Cultural Affairs, Taipei City Government
- Website: Official website

The Taipei Film Commission (TFC; traditional Chinese: 台北市電影委員會; simplified Chinese: 台北市电影委员会; pinyin: Táiběi Shì Diànyǐng Wěiyuánhuì) is an organization based in Da'an District, Taipei, Taiwan.

== History ==
The commission was established in 2007.

== Transportation ==
The headquarters of the organization is accessible within walking distance east of Xinyi Anhe Station of Taipei Metro.

== See also ==
- Cinema of Taiwan
