= Mukoyama =

Mukoyama is a surname. Notable people with the name include:

- James Mukoyama (born 1944), American general
- Jun Mukōyama (born 1983), Japanese politician

== See also ==
- 向山 (disambiguation)
