= Xiangshan District, Guilin =

Xiangshan 象山区 · Siengsanh Gih
- District
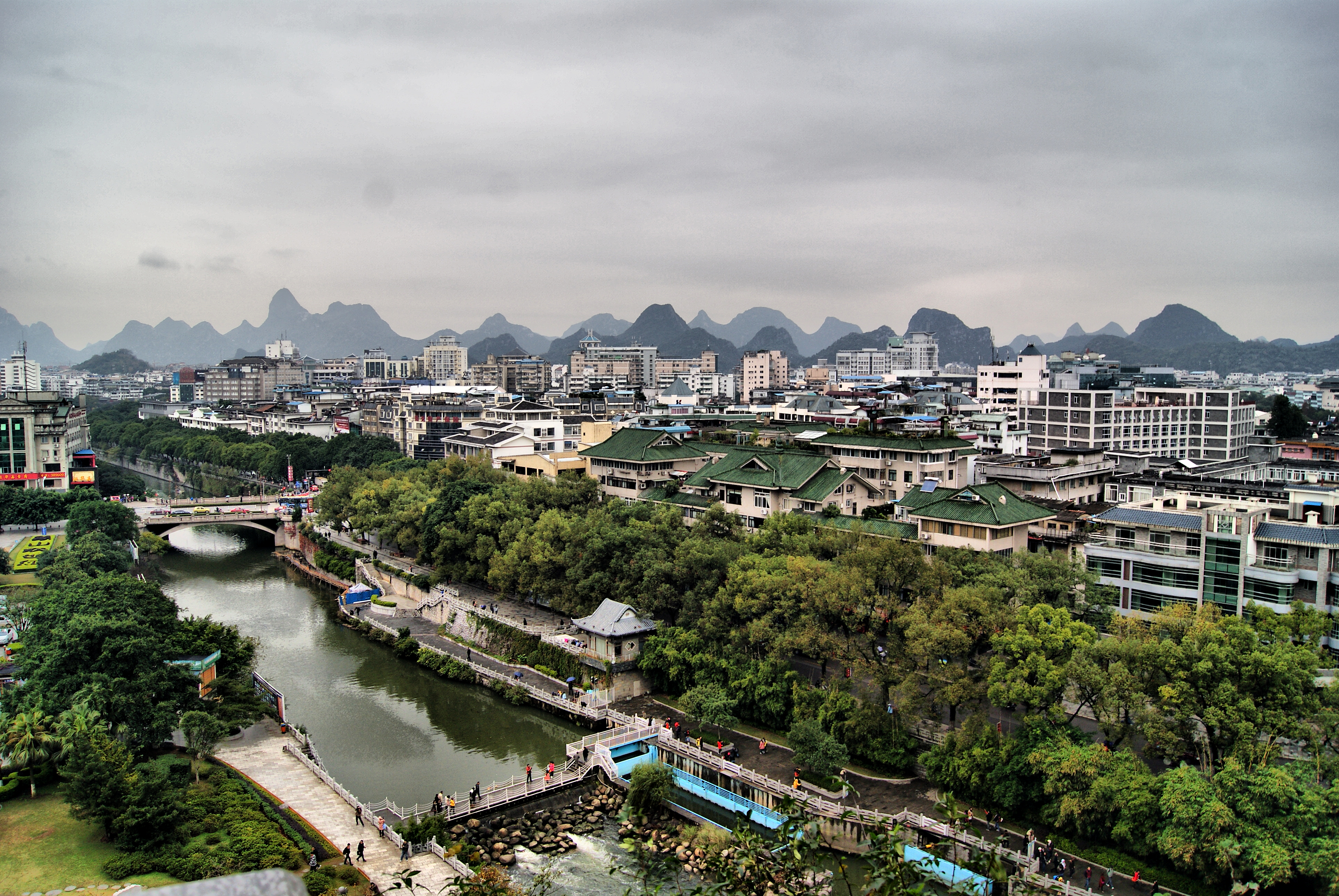

- Location in Guangxi
- Coordinates: 25°15′43″N 110°16′52″E
- Country: China
- Autonomous region: Guangxi
- Prefecture-level city: Guilin
- District seat: Nanmen Subdistrict

Area
  - Total: 88 km^{2} (34 sq mi)

Population (2020)
  - Total: 286,872
  - Density: 3,300/km^{2} (8,400/sq mi)
- Time zone: UTC+8 (China Standard)
- Website: www.glxsqzf.gov.cn

Xiangshan District ( [ɕjâŋ.ʂán] simplified Chinese: 象山区; traditional Chinese: 象山區; pinyin: Xiàngshān Qū; Zhuang: Siengsanh Gih) is a district of the city of Guilin, Guangxi, China.

== Administrative divisions ==
Xiangshan District is divided into 3 subdistricts and 1 township:

- Nanmen Subdistrict (南门街道)
- Xiangshan Subdistrict (象山街道)
- Pingshan Subdistrict (平山街道)
- Ertang Township (二塘乡)

== Tourist attractions ==
- Chongshan Street Mosque
