= Xiangshan, Taipei =

Mountain in Xinyi District, Taipei, Taiwan

Xiangshan
- Elephant Mountain
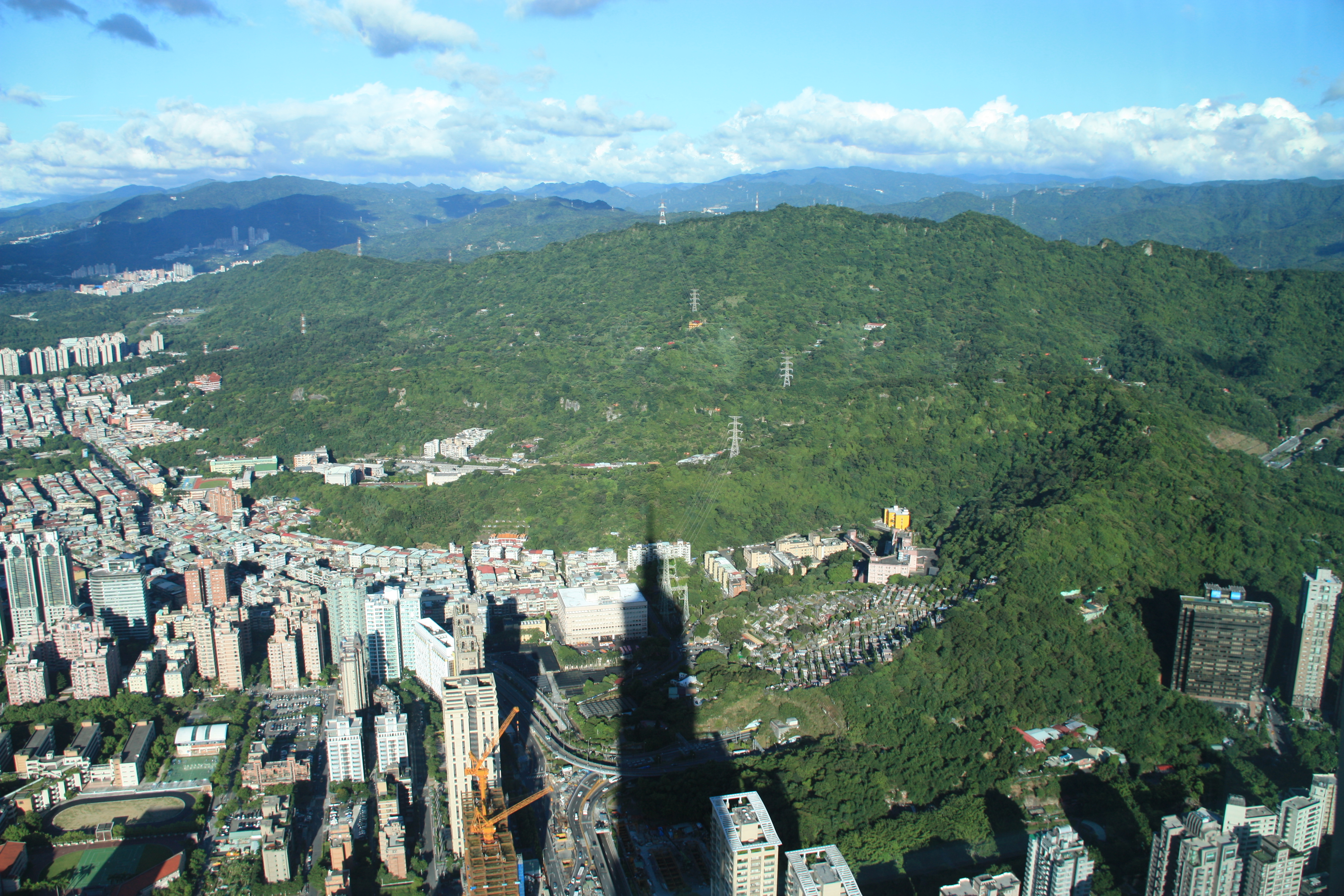
- Xiangshan as viewed from Taipei 101's observation deck

Highest point
- Elevation: 183 metres (600 ft)
- Coordinates: 25.0269°N 121.5766°E

Geography
- Location within Taiwan
- Selected locations in the Nangang Mountains near Xinyi District, Taipei 1 Xiangshan MRT, Exit 2; 2 Daitiandian Lingyun Temple; 3 Xiangshan (Elephant) summit 4 Shishan (Lion) summit 5 Baoshan (Leopard) summit 6 Hushan (Tiger) summit 7 Songshan Fengtian Temple; 8 Houshanpi MRT The location of Xiangshan
- Location: Xinyi District, Taipei, Taiwan

Climbing
- Easiest route: Hiking trail

Xiangshan (Chinese: 象山), known in English as Elephant Mountain or Mount Elephant, is a mountain in Xinyi District, Taipei, Taiwan. It is close to the Taipei Metro Xiangshan Station. It is 183 m (600 ft) high and has a hiking trail to the peak, covering a distance of about 1.5 km (0.93 mi). Taipei 101 can be seen from the trail. The Six Giant Rocks on the peak are a tourist attraction in Xiangshan, and there are platforms for photographers.

== Name ==
"Xiangshan" means "Elephant Mountain" in Chinese. Xiangshan's name comes from its elephant-like shape.

== Geology ==
Xiangshan is one of the Four Beast Mountains (四獸山), which also include Lion (獅山), Leopard (豹山), and Tiger (虎山) mountains in the Nangang Mountain System. It is mainly composed of sandstone. Plants include the ferns Cibotium cumingii and Cyathea lepifera.

== Transportation ==
The trail to the mountain summit and observation platforms is accessible by walking south from Exit 2 of Xiangshan Station of the Taipei Metro, proceeding along Xiangshan Park to the western trailhead next to Daitiandian Lingyun Temple.

As an alternative, hikers may proceed from the eastern end, starting from the trailhead behind Songshan Fengtian Temple, which is a short walk south from the Houshanpi station.

View of the Taipei Basin from the Six Giant Rocks, 2013

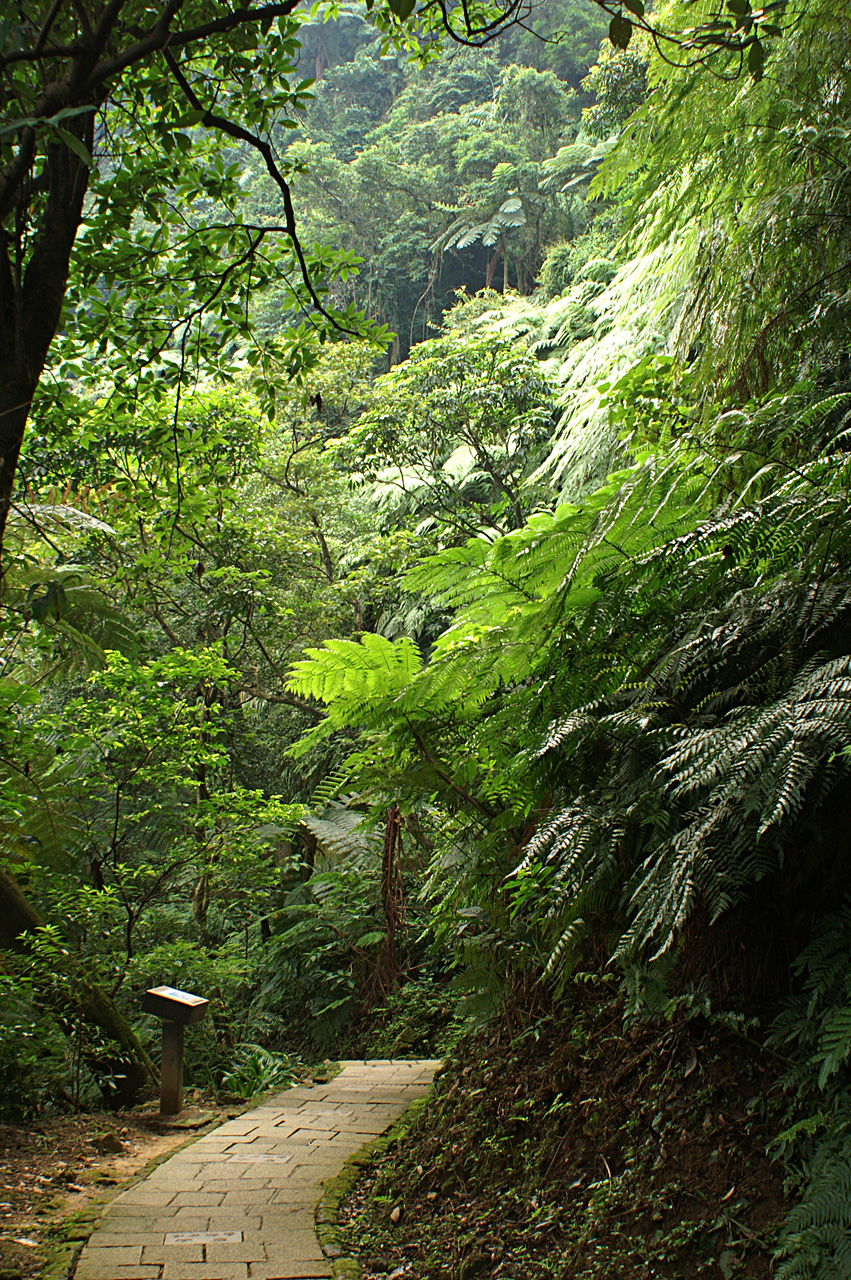
Xiangshan hiking trail

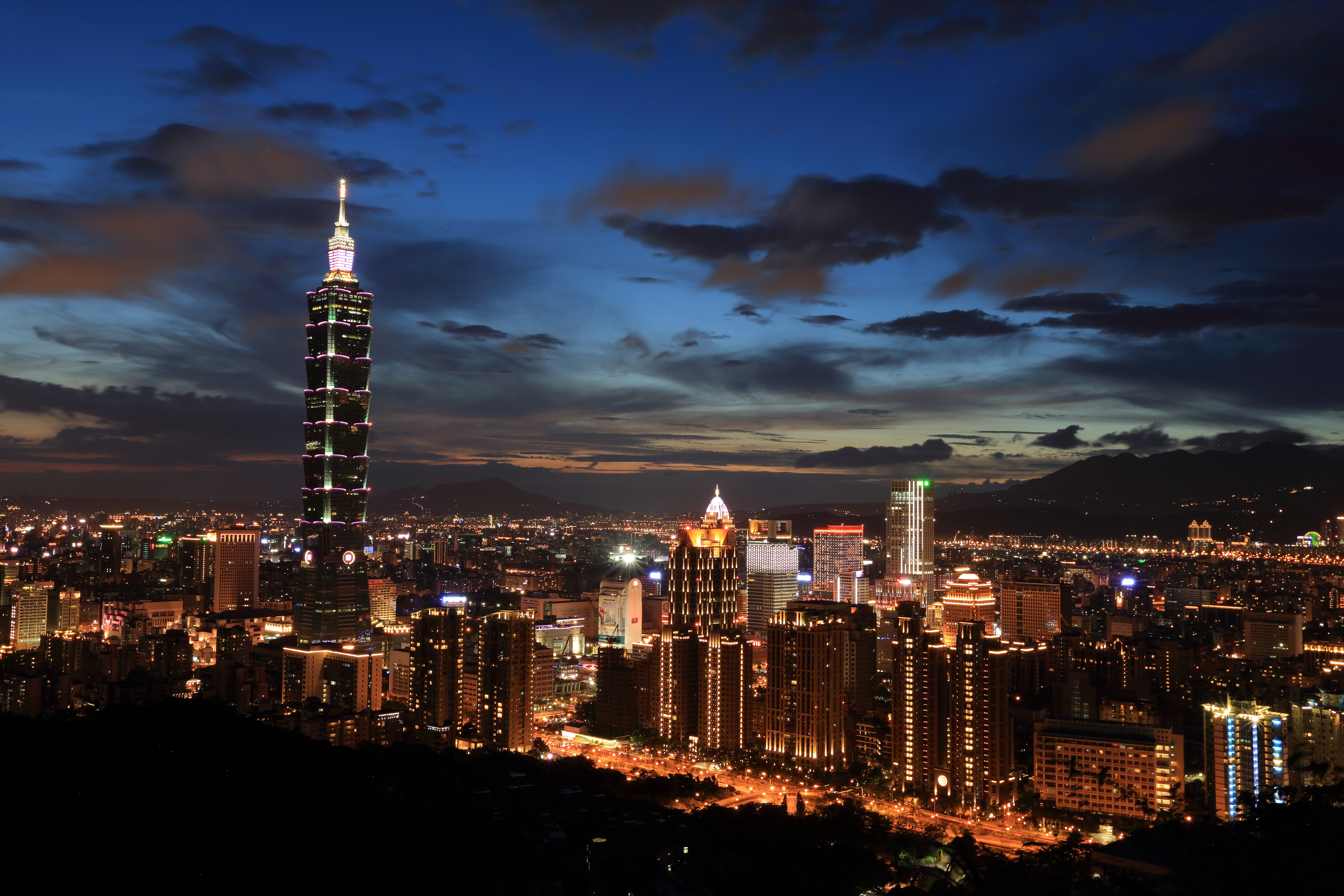
Taipei skyline viewed from Xiangshan, including Taipei 101, illuminated at dusk (2015)

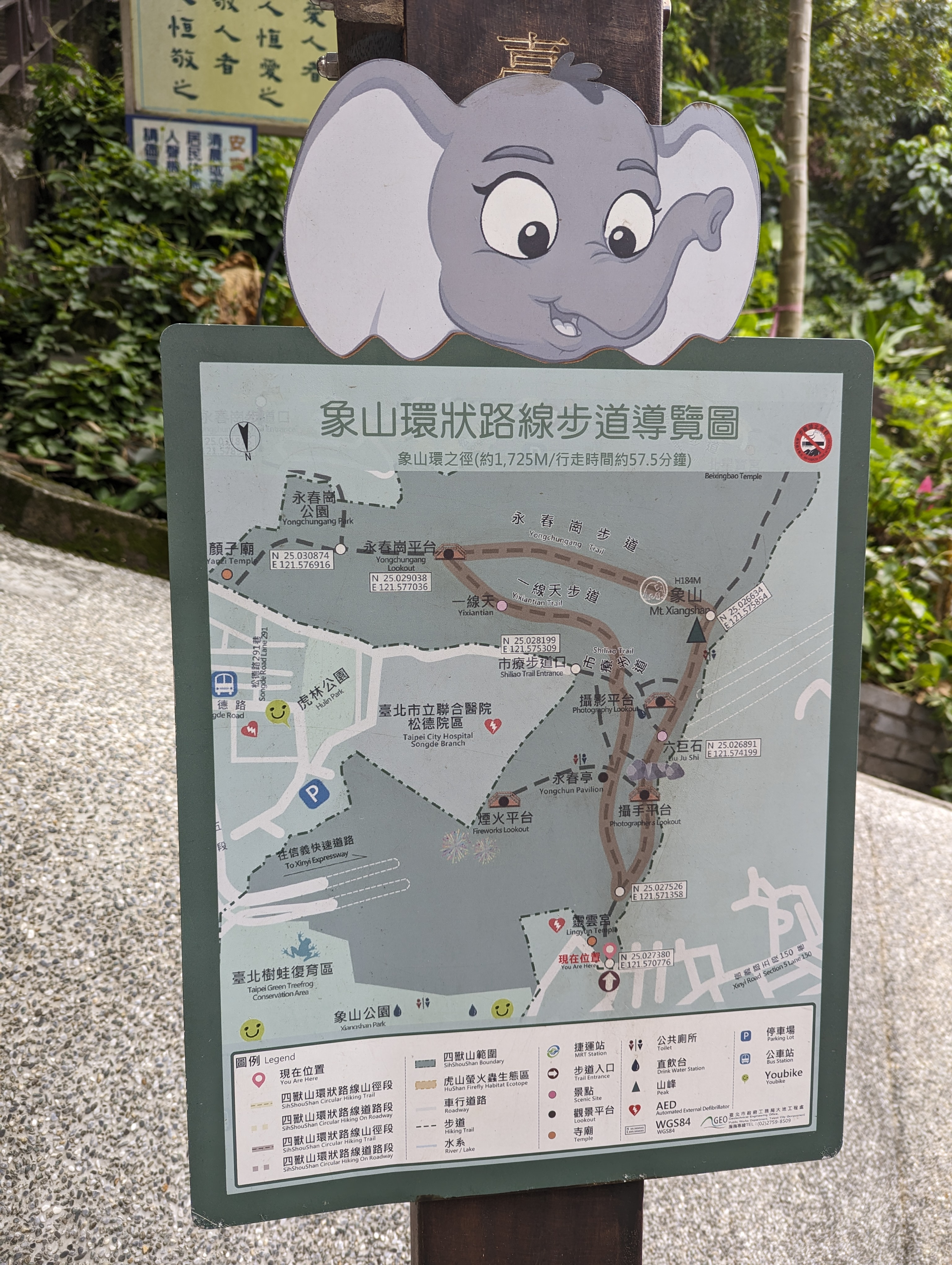
Trail map

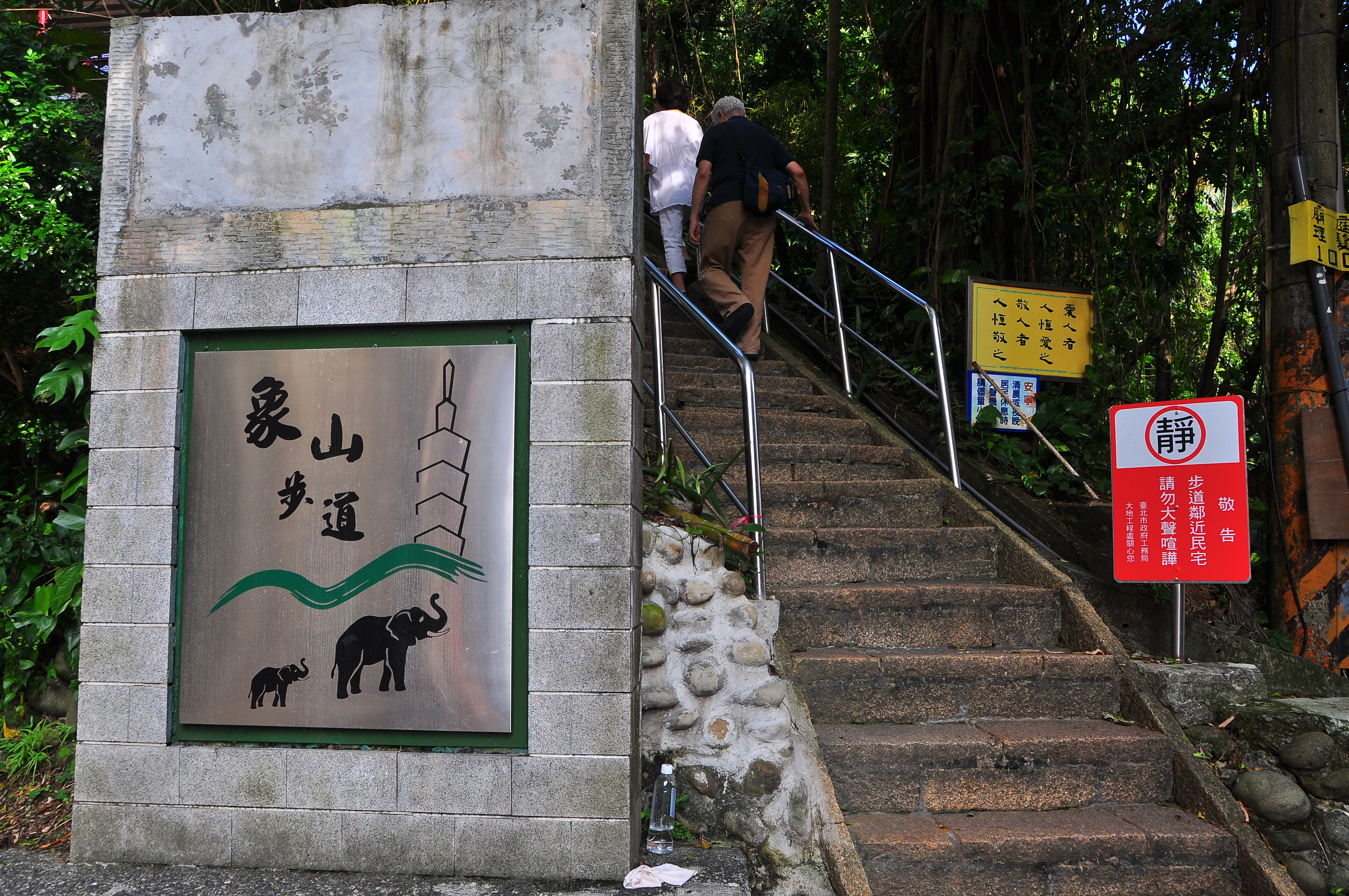
Western trailhead near Daitiandian Lingyun Temple with steep, narrow stairways

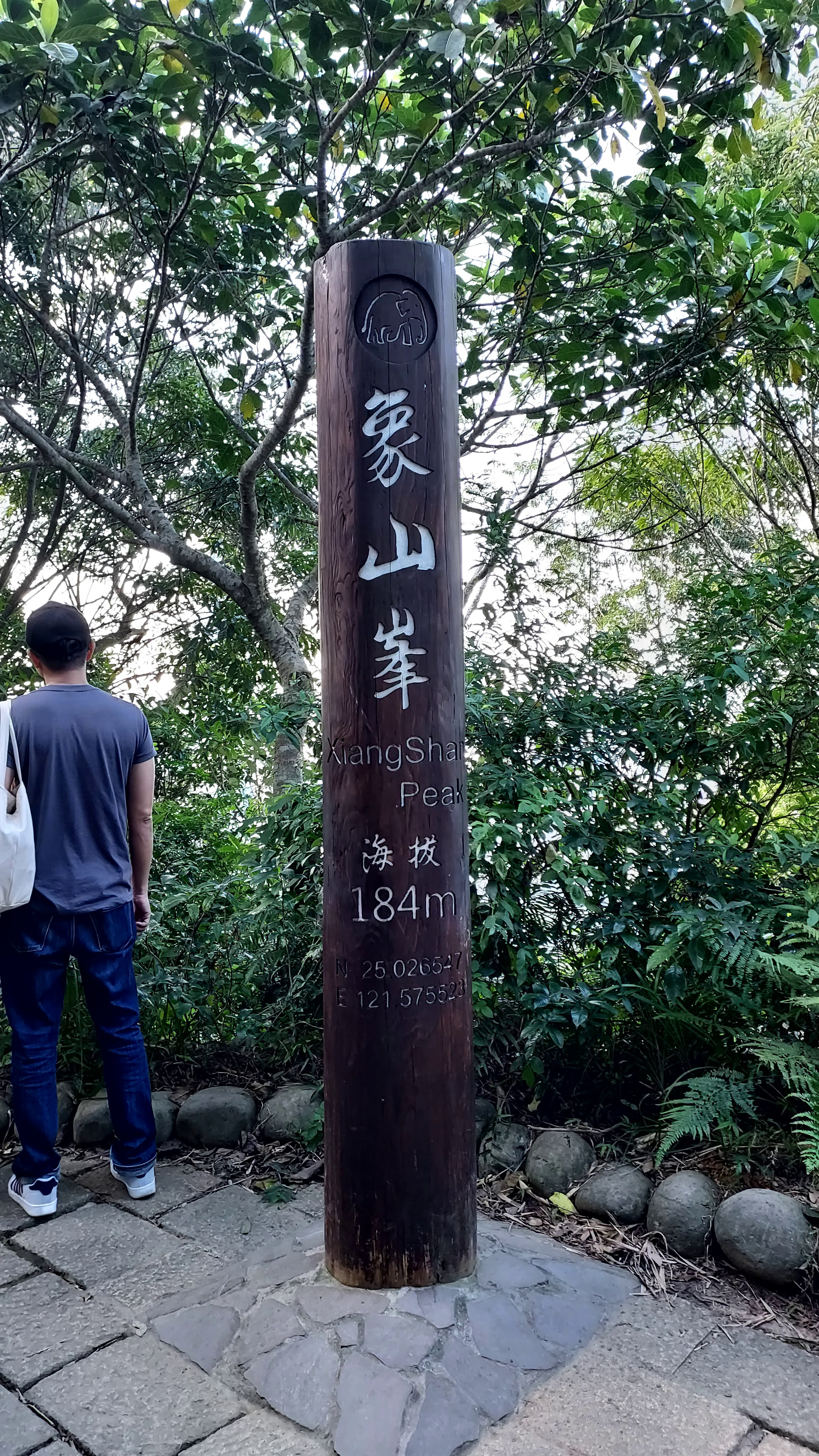
Summit marker

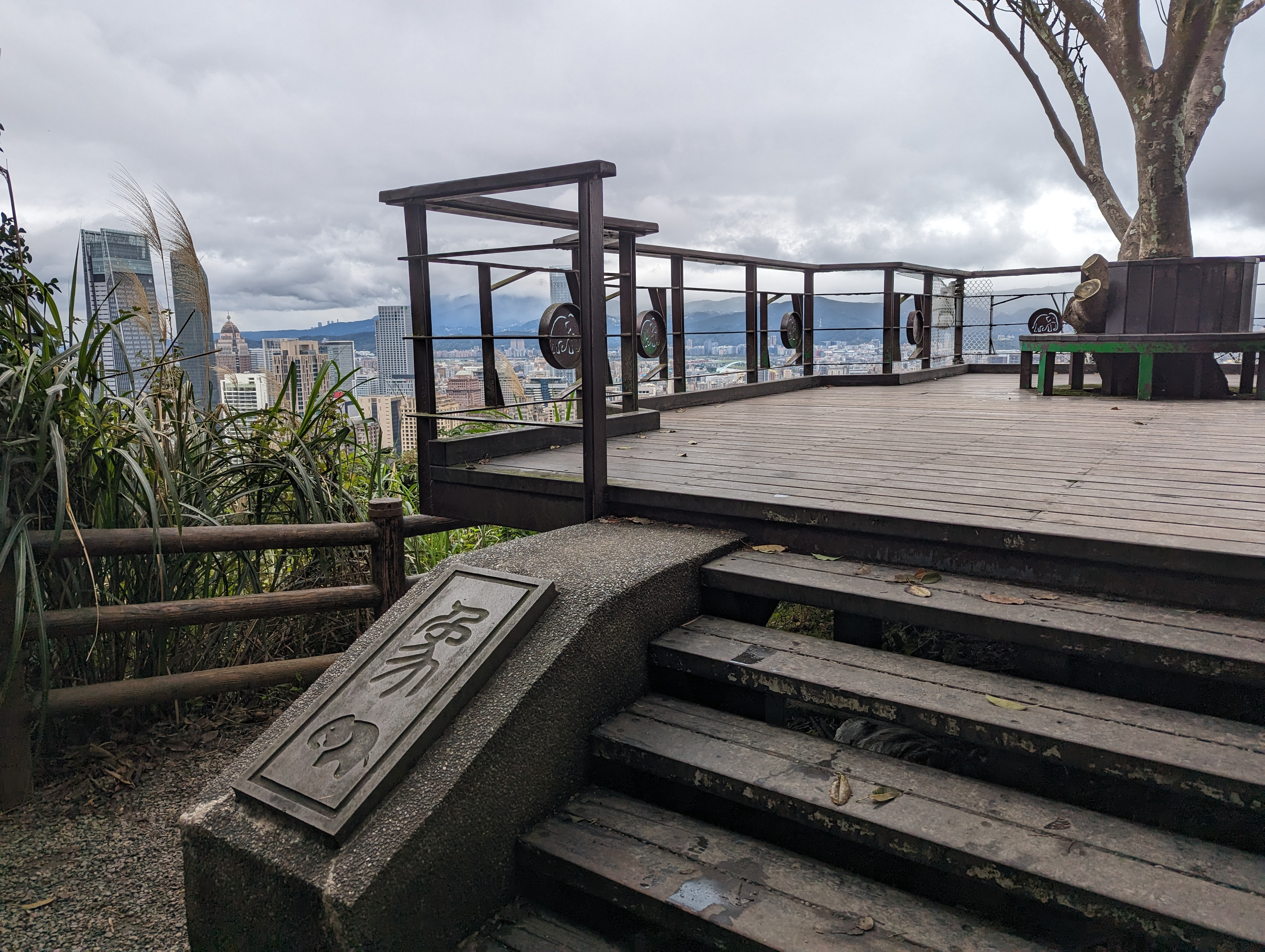
Observation deck

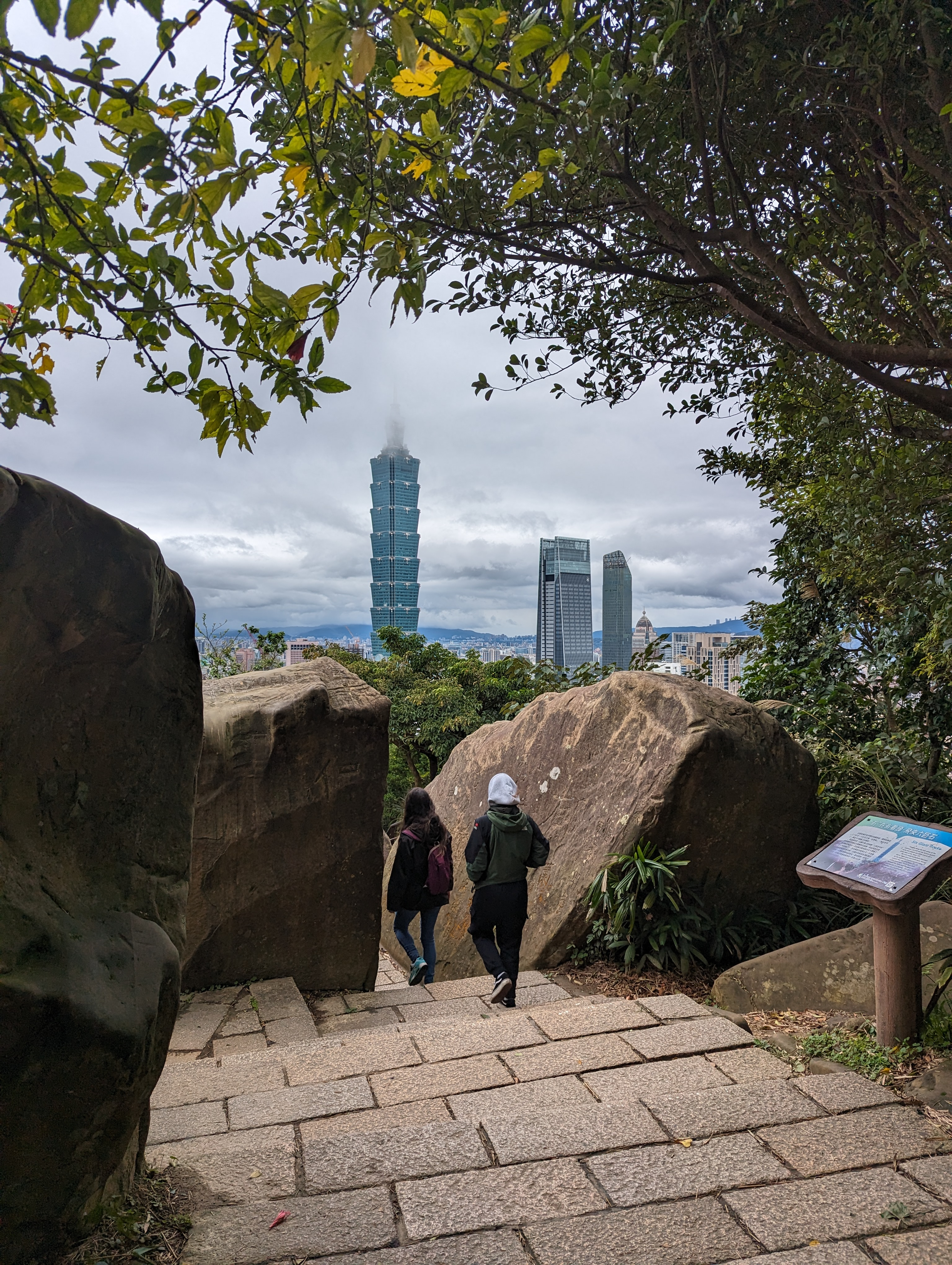
Hikers descending through cut in massive boulders

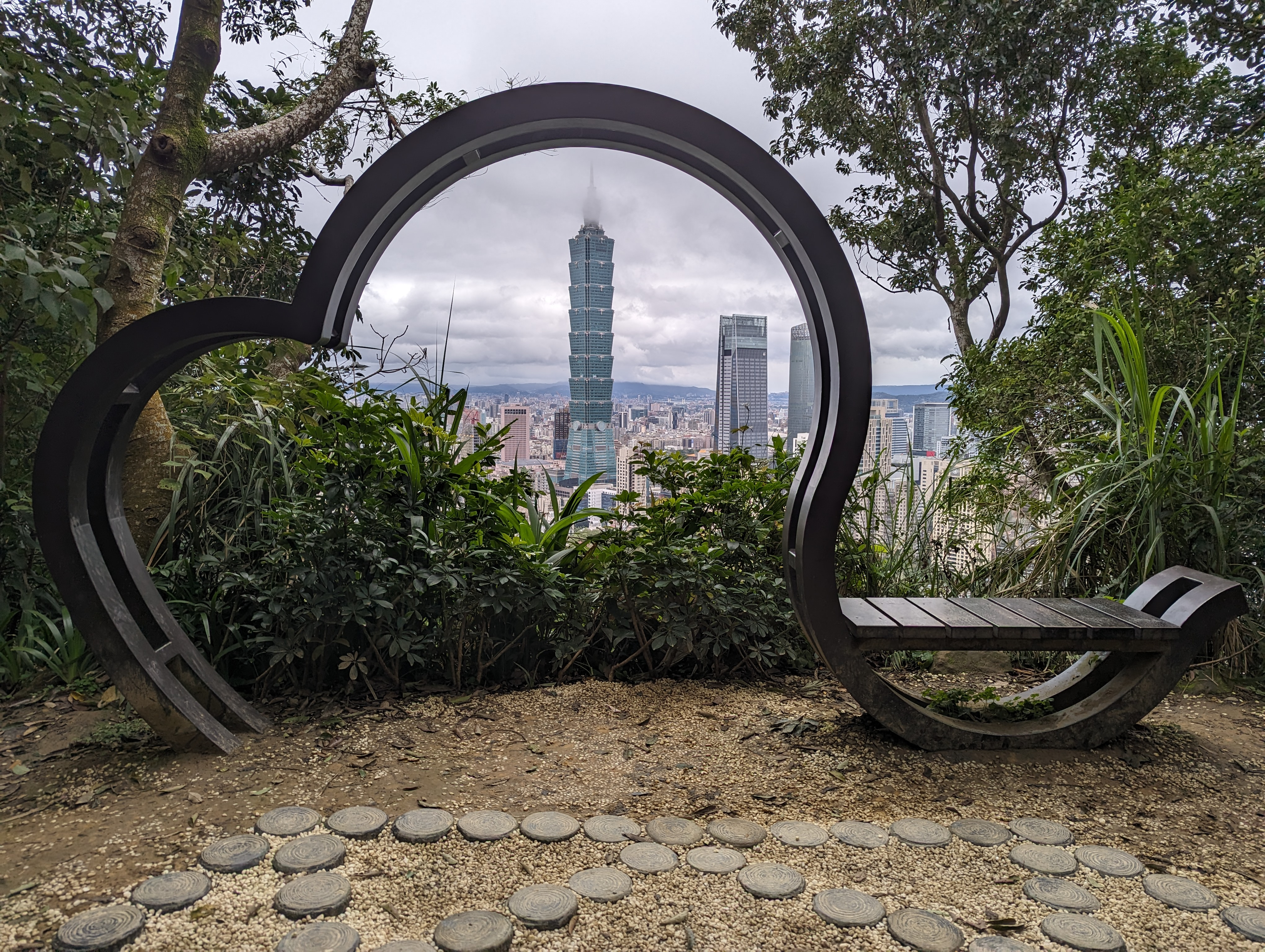
Taipei 101, framed in elephant-shaped bench at summit
Panoramic views from Xiangshan

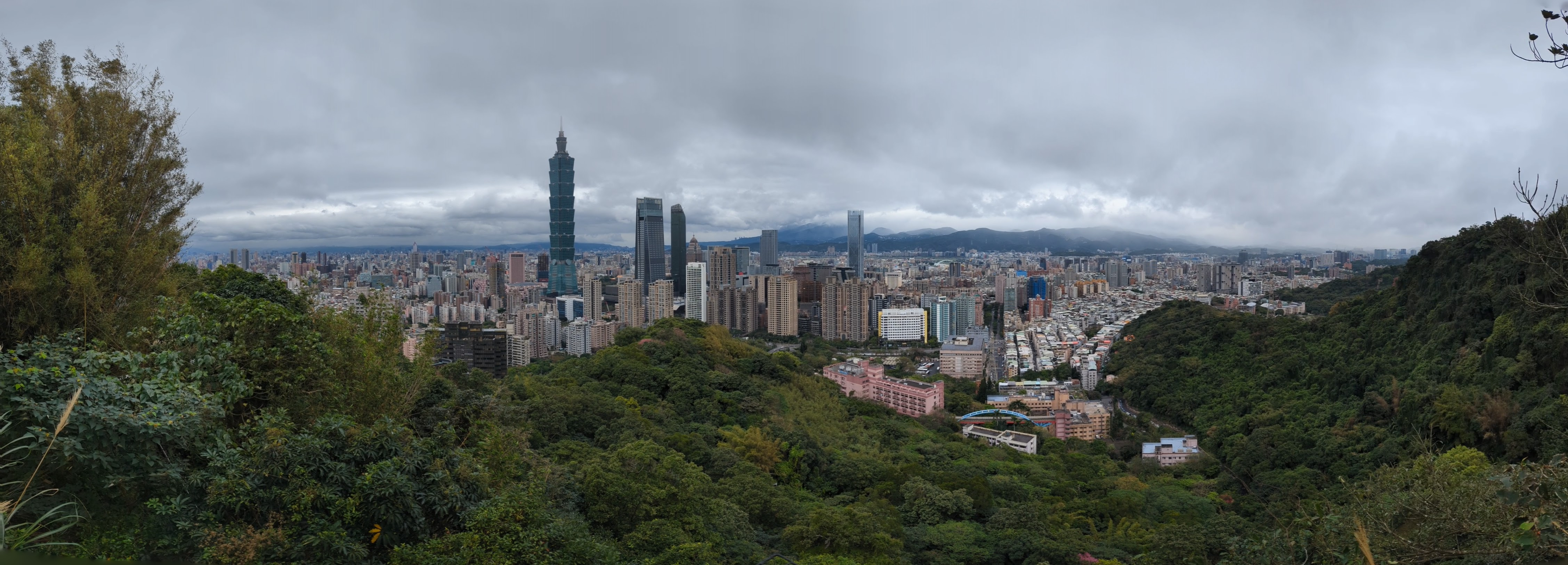
Panorama (day)

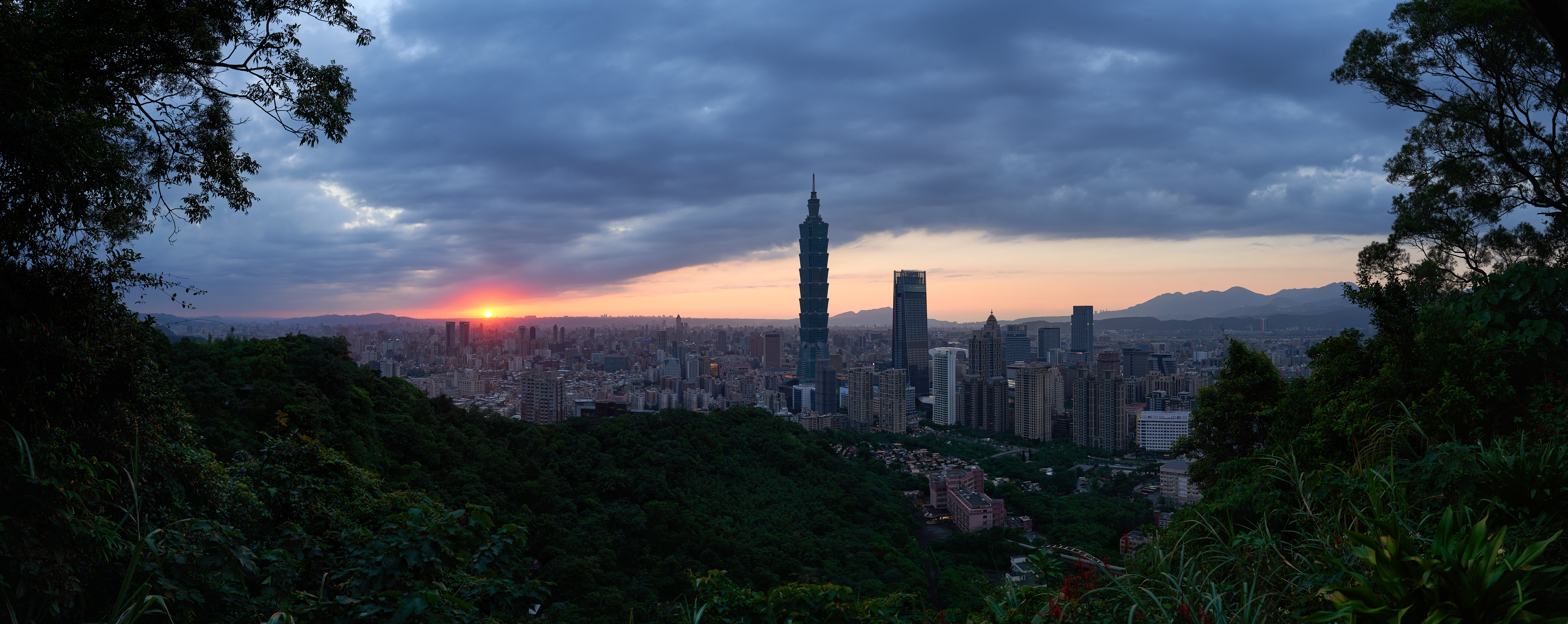
Panorama (sunset)

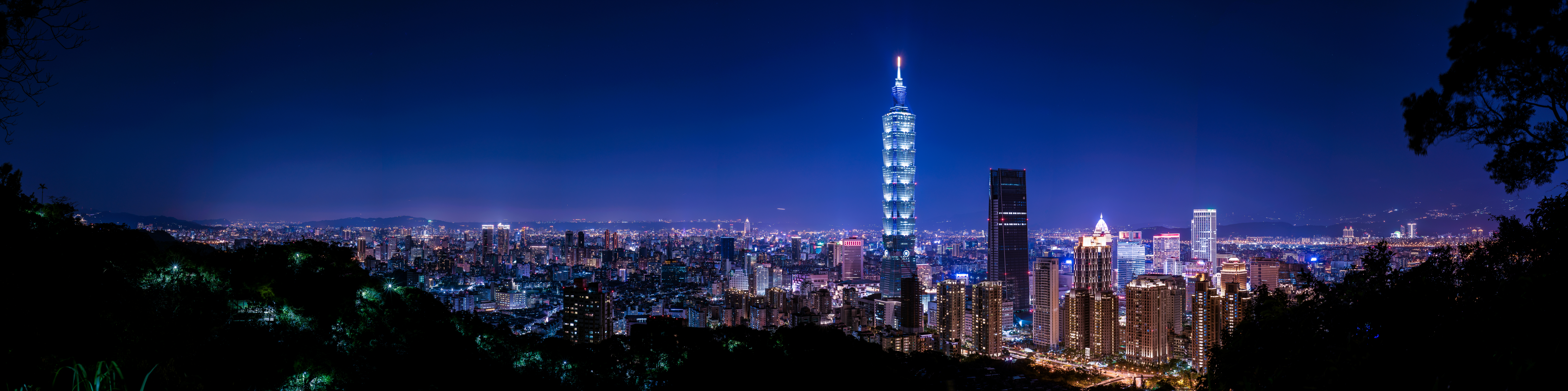
Panorama (night)
