= Koyama =

Koyama (Japanese: 小山) or Kōyama (Japanese: 高山, 神山) may refer to:

== Places ==
- Koyama (island), an island part of the Bajuni Islands archipelago in the Indian Ocean
- Kōyama, Kagoshima, a town located in Kimotsuki District, Kagoshima, Japan merged in 2005 with the town of Uchinoura
- Koyama Station, a train station in Tottori, Tottori Prefecture, Japan

== People ==
- Akiko Koyama (小山 明子; born 1935), Japanese actress
- Andy Koyama (born 1962), Canadian sound engineer
- Chire Koyama (小山 ちれ; born 1964), Chinese-Japanese former table tennis world champion
- Hikaru Koyama (小山 ひかる; born 1991), member of Hinoi Team, a former Japanese female pop group
- Hiroshige Koyama (小山 博滋; born 1937–2016), Japanese botanist
- Hisako Koyama (小山 ひさ子; born 1916–1997), Japanese Astronomer
- Keiichiro Koyama (小山 慶一郎; born 1984), Japanese musician
- Kenji Koyama (小山 健二; born 1972), Japanese football player
- Kimiko Koyama (こやま きみこ; born 1979), Japanese voice actress
- Kiyoshige Koyama (小山 清茂; 1914–2009), Japanese composer for orchestras, vocal and traditional Japanese instrumentation
- Kosuke Koyama (小山 晃佑; 1929–2009), Japanese Protestant Christian theologian
- Mami Koyama (小山 茉美; born 1955), Japanese veteran voice actress and J-pop vocalist
- Masaaki Koyama (小山 正明; 1934–2025), Japanese baseball player
- Miki Koyama (小山 美姫; born 1997), Japanese racing driver
- Momoyo Koyama (小山 百代; born 1995), Japanese voice actress
- Remi Koyama (小山 玲弥; born 2000), Japanese ice hockey player
- Rikiya Koyama (小山 力也; born 1963), Japanese actor and voice actor
- Seijirō Kōyama (神山 征二郎; born 1941), Japanese film director
- Shinichiro Koyama (小山 伸一郎; born 1978), Japanese baseball player
- Shin-ya Koyama (小山 信也; born 1962), Japanese mathematician
- Takaharu Koyama (小山 隆治; born 1948), Japanese former middle-distance runner
- Takao Koyama (小山 高生; born 1948), Japanese screenwriter and novelist
- Takuto Koyama (小山 拓土; born 1982), Japanese football player
- Tetsuo Michael Koyama (1933–2024), Japanese botanist and collector
- Tomoaki Koyama (小山 朋昭; born 1971), Japanese pair skater
- Tomoyoshi Koyama (小山 知良; born 1983), Japanese motorcycle road racer
- Tsutomu Koyama (小山 勉; 1936–2012), Japanese volleyball player
- Yasuo Koyama (小山 靖男; 1937–2000), Japanese Go player
- Yū Koyama (小山 ゆう; born 1948), Japanese manga artist
- Yuki Koyama (小山 雄輝; born 1988), Japanese baseball player

== Other ==
- 3383 Koyama, a main-belt asteroid discovered in 1951
- Kōyama Garden, a Japanese garden in Tokyo, Japan
- Koyama's spruce (Picea koyamae), a tree species found in Japan
- Koyama Press, a Canadian publisher

== See also ==
- Oyama (disambiguation)
- List of most common surnames in Asia
- 向山 (disambiguation)
