= Guangci/Fengtian Temple metro station =

Tamsui-Xinyi Line's southeastern termini and MRT Station

Guangci/Fengtian Temple 廣慈/奉天宮
- Platform level of Guangci/Fengtian Temple station (shot on September 1, 2026)

Chinese name
- Traditional Chinese: 廣慈/奉天宮
- Simplified Chinese: 广慈/奉天宫
Transcriptions
Standard Mandarin
- Hanyu Pinyin: Guǎngcí/Fèngtiāngōng
- Bopomofo: ㄍㄨㄤˇ ㄘˊ/ㄈㄥˋ ㄊㄧㄢ ㄍㄨㄥ
- Wade–Giles: Kuang^{3}-tz‘ŭ^{2}/Fêng^{4}-t‘ien^{1}-kung^{1}
Hakka
- Pha̍k-fa-sṳ: Kóng-chhṳ̀/Fung-thiên-kiûng
Yue: Cantonese
- Yale Romanization: Gwóngchìh/Fuhngtīngūng
Southern Min
- Hokkien POJ: Kóng-chû/Hōng-thian-kiong

General information
- Location: Fude St; Xinyi, Taipei; Taiwan
- Coordinates: 25.037469°N 121.581881°E
- Owner: Taipei DORTS
- Operator: Taipei Rapid Transit Corporation
- Line: Tamsui–Xinyi line

Construction
- Structure type: Underground
- Accessible: Yes

Other information
- Station code: R01

History
- Opened: August 30, 2026

Services
| Preceding station | Taipei Metro | Following station |
|---|---|---|
| Terminus | Tamsui–Xinyi line | Xiangshan towards Tamsui |
Location

Guangci/Fengtian Temple station (Chinese: 廣慈/奉天宮站) is a metro station on the Tamsui–Xinyi line located in Xinyi, Taipei, Taiwan. Serving as the terminal station on the Xinyi branch, the station opened on August 30, 2026.

== Station overview ==
The station is a three-level, underground station with an island platform, serving as the terminus of the Xinyi Eastern Extension. "Rising Water" will be the core basis for the architectural design concept of the station.

== Station layout ==
| 1F | Street level | Entrance/exit |
| B1 | Concourse | Lobby, information desk, automatic ticketing dispensing machines, one-way faregates, Restrooms |
| B3 | Platform 1 | ← Tamsui–Xinyi line toward Tamsui (R02 Xiangshan) |
| B3 | Island platform |
| B3 | Platform 2 | ← Tamsui–Xinyi line toward Tamsui (R02 Xiangshan) |

== Around the station ==
- Fengtian Temple
- Guangci Charity Park
- Xinyi District Office
