= Xiangshan metro station =

Taipei Metro Xinyi Line station

Xiangshan / Y41 象山
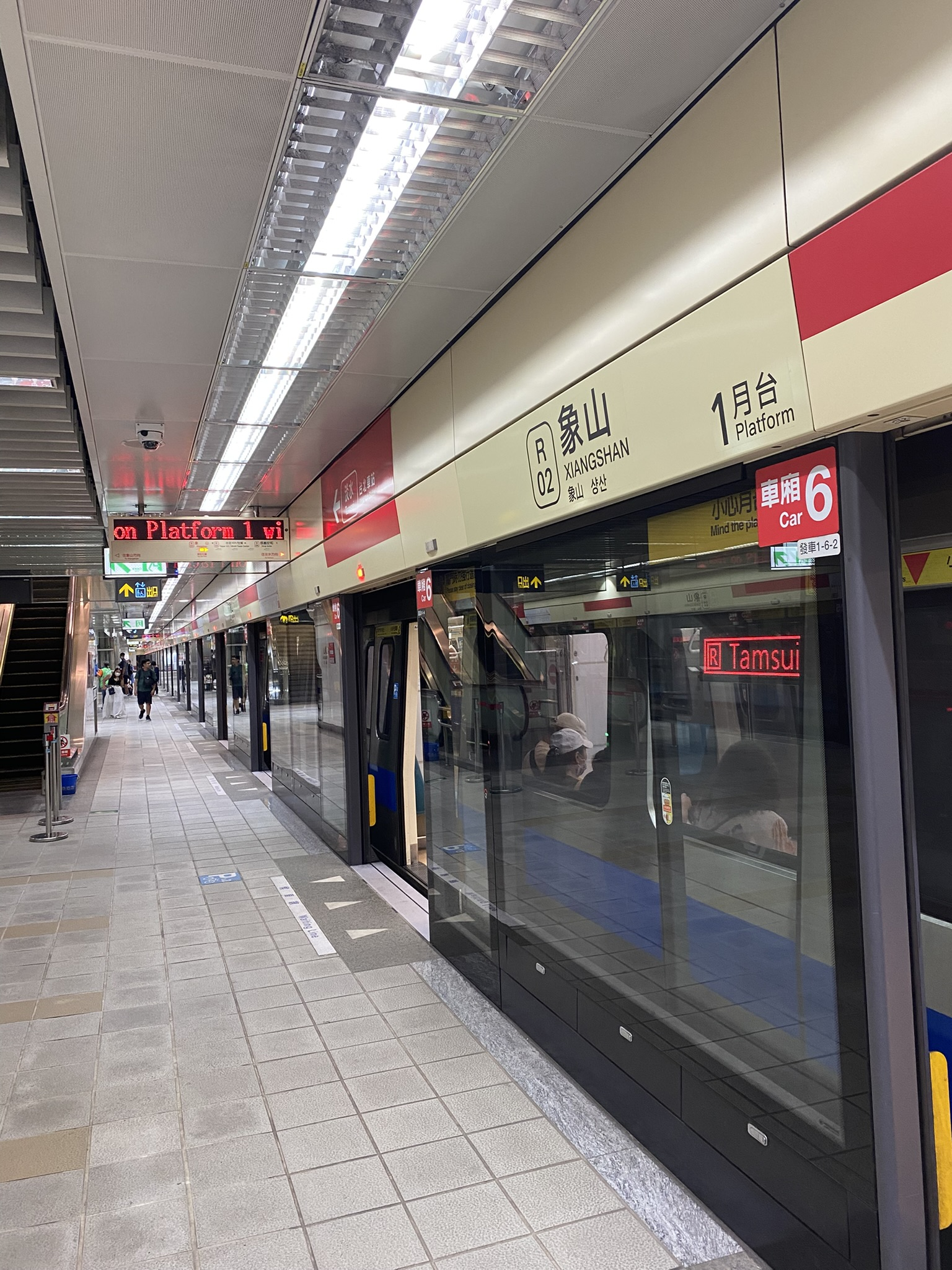
- Platform, July 18, 2025

Chinese name
- Chinese: 象山
- Literal meaning: Elephant Mountain
Transcriptions
Standard Mandarin
- Hanyu Pinyin: Xiàngshān
- Wade–Giles: Hsiang⁴-shan¹
Hakka
- Pha̍k-fa-sṳ: Siong-sân
Southern Min
- Hokkien POJ: Chhiūⁿ-soaⁿ
- Tâi-lô: Tshiūnn-suann

General information
- Location: Xinyi Rd., Sec. 5 Xinyi, Taipei; Taiwan
- Coordinates: 25.0327°N 121.5689°E
- Operator: Taipei Metro
- Lines: Tamsui–Xinyi Line; Circular Line (under construction)
- Platforms: 1
- Tracks: 2

Construction
- Structure type: Underground
- Platform levels: 3

Other information
- Station code: , Y41

History
- Opened: November 24, 2013; 12 years ago

Passengers
- 29,337 daily (December 2024)
- Rank: (Ranked 56 of 119)

Services
Preceding station	Taipei Metro	Following station
Guangci/Fengtian Temple Terminus	Tamsui–Xinyi Line	Taipei 101/World Trade Center towards Tamsui
Yongchun Foward direction	Circular Line Opening 2032	Y42 Reverse direction
Location

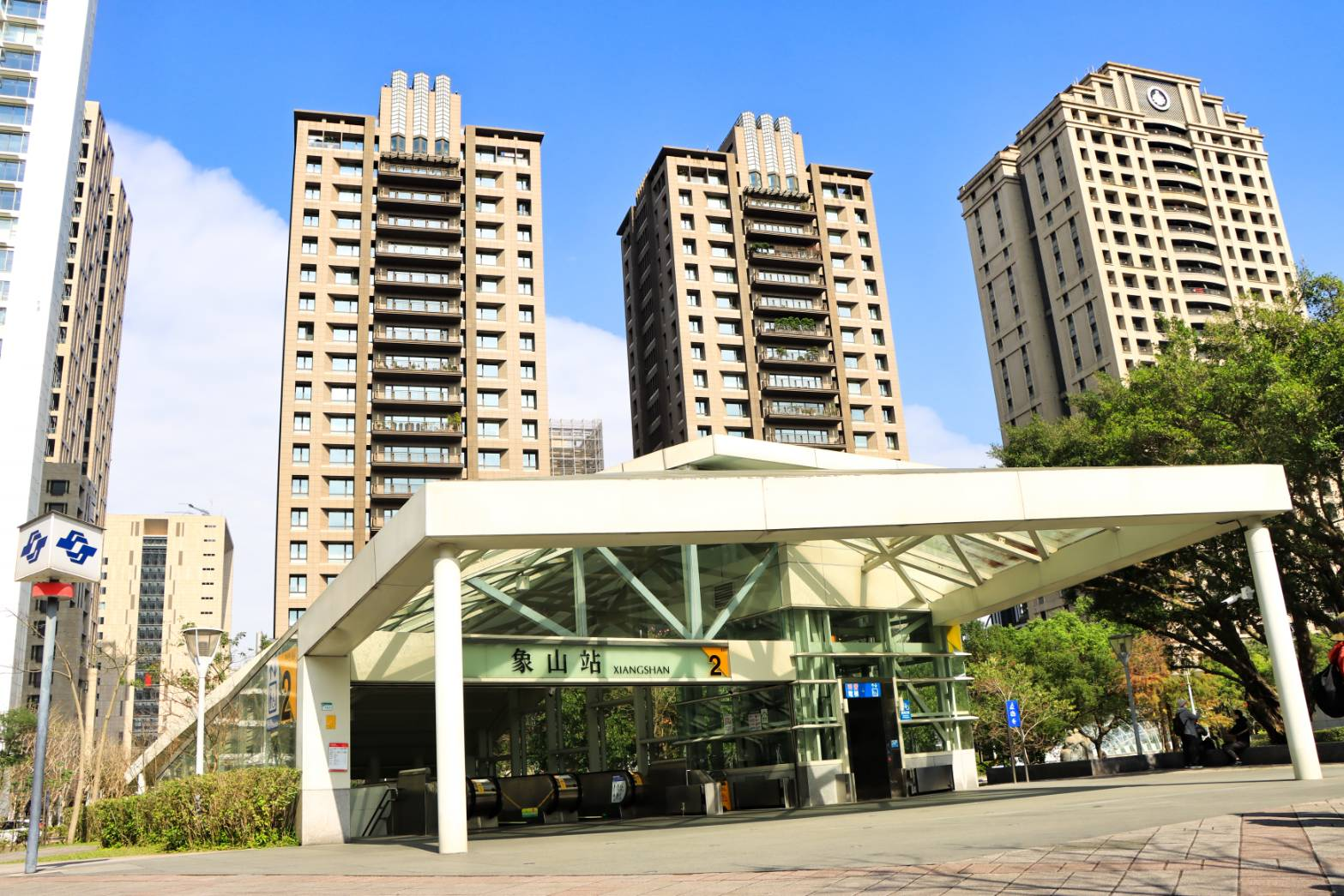
Exit 2 in 2023

The Taipei Metro Xiangshan station is a metro station on the Red Line located in Xinyi, Taipei, Taiwan. The station opened on November 24, 2013.

== Station overview ==
The two-level, underground station with an island platform. It is located beneath Xinyi Rd., Sec. 5 east of Songren Rd. and near the north end of Zhongqiang Park and the Xinyi Expressway. The Xiangshan hiking trail is located nearby the station.

== History ==
The construction of this station began in July 2005 and was completed in November 2013. It served as the former southern terminus of the Tamsui-Xinyi line, before its replacement by Guangci/Fentian Temple station on August 30, 2026. The Circular line will make an out-of-station interchange with the Tamsui-Xinyi line at this station.

== Construction ==
The station is 220 m (720 ft) long, 22 m (72 ft) wide, and 22 m (72 ft) deep. It has three entrances, two elevators for the disabled, and two vent shafts.

Due to space limitations caused by the Xinyi Expressway, a vehicle overpass, and Taiwan Power Company culverts, the station was constructed using the pipe jacking method instead of the usual cut-and-cover method.

== First and Last Train Timing ==
The first and last train timing for Xiangshan station is as follows:

Destination	First train		Last train
Destination	Mon − Fri	Sat − Sun and P.H.	Daily
Tamsui–Xinyi Line
R28 Tamsui	06:03	06:03	00:05
R01 Guangci/Fengtian Temple	06:05	06:05	01:15

== Station layout ==
1F	Street Level	Entrance/Exit
B1	Concourse	Lobby, information desk, automatic ticketing dispensing machines, one-way faregates Restrooms
B2	Platform 1	← Tamsui–Xinyi line toward Tamsui (R03 Taipei 101/World Trade Center)
B2	Island platform, doors open on the left
B2	Platform 2	→ Tamsui–Xinyi line toward Guangci/Fengtian Temple (R01 Guangci/Fengtian Temple)

== Public Art ==
The design theme for the station is "Song of tree frogs - presentation of geographical features dialoguing with nature". Due to the station's proximity to Elephant Mountain, it is close to the protected habitat of Taipei tree frogs. Artwork presents natural features and various poses of tree frogs.

== Around the Station ==
- Elephant Mountain (Exit 2)
- Xiangshan Park (Exit 2)
- Sanzhangli Park (Exit 2)
- Taipei Municipal Xingya Junior High School (Exit 3)
- Bo'ai Elementary School (Exit 3)
- Four YouBike Stations
