= Taipei Children's Amusement Park =

Amusement park in Shilin, Taipei, Taiwan

Taipei Children's Amusement Park 臺北市立兒童新樂園
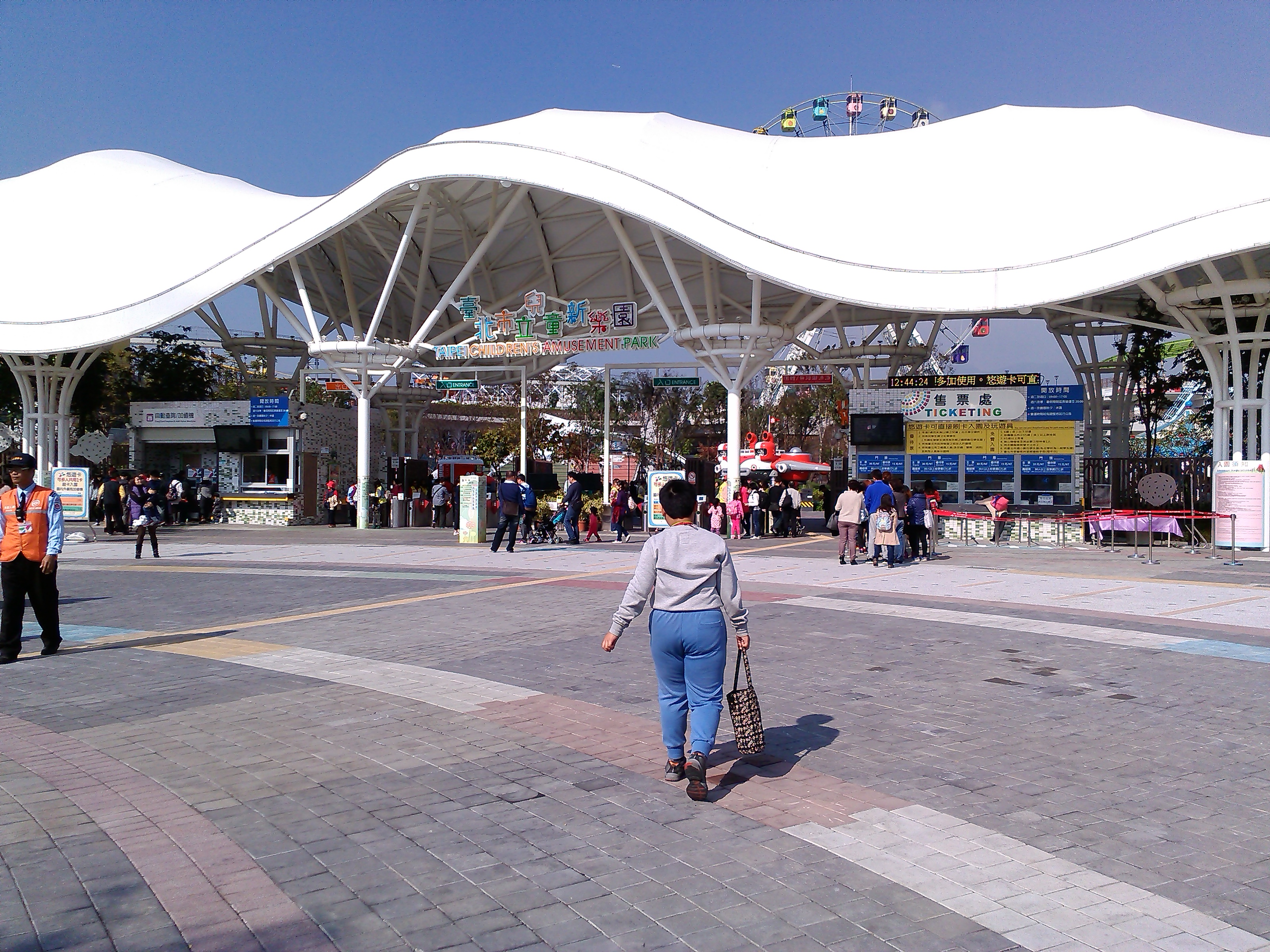
- Interactive map of Taipei Children's Amusement Park 臺北市立兒童新樂園
- Location: Shilin, Taipei, Taiwan
- Coordinates: 25°05′50.0″N 121°30′54.1″E
- Status: Operating
- Opened: 16 December 2014
- Owner: Taipei City Government
- Operated by: Taipei Rapid Transit Corporation
- Area: 5 ha (12 acres)
- Website: Official website

The Taipei Children's Amusement Park (TCAP; Chinese: 臺北市立兒童新樂園; Tongyong Pinyin: Táiběi Shìlì Értóng Sīn Lèyuán) is an amusement park in Shilin District, Taipei, Taiwan. It is the largest publicly operated amusement park in Taiwan.

== History ==
The area where the park lies today used to be a Pokémon themed amusement park. On 11 April 2006, the area was designated as a national archaeological site. In October 2007, the Taipei City Government then initiated a plan to redevelop the area into a new children's park. The park was then opened to the public on 16 December 2014. Taipei Rapid Transit Corporation was commissioned for its management and maintenance.

== Architecture ==
The park spans over an area of 5 hectares. It is divided into three main zones, which are Fantasy Forest and Dream Ocean, Magic Planet and Toy Soldier Kingdom.

== Transportation ==
The park is accessible within walking distance north west of Shilin Station of Taipei Metro.

== See also ==
- List of tourist attractions in Taiwan
