= National Taiwan Science Education Center =

Science center in Shilin, Taipei, Taiwan

- 國立臺灣科學教育館
- NTSEC logo

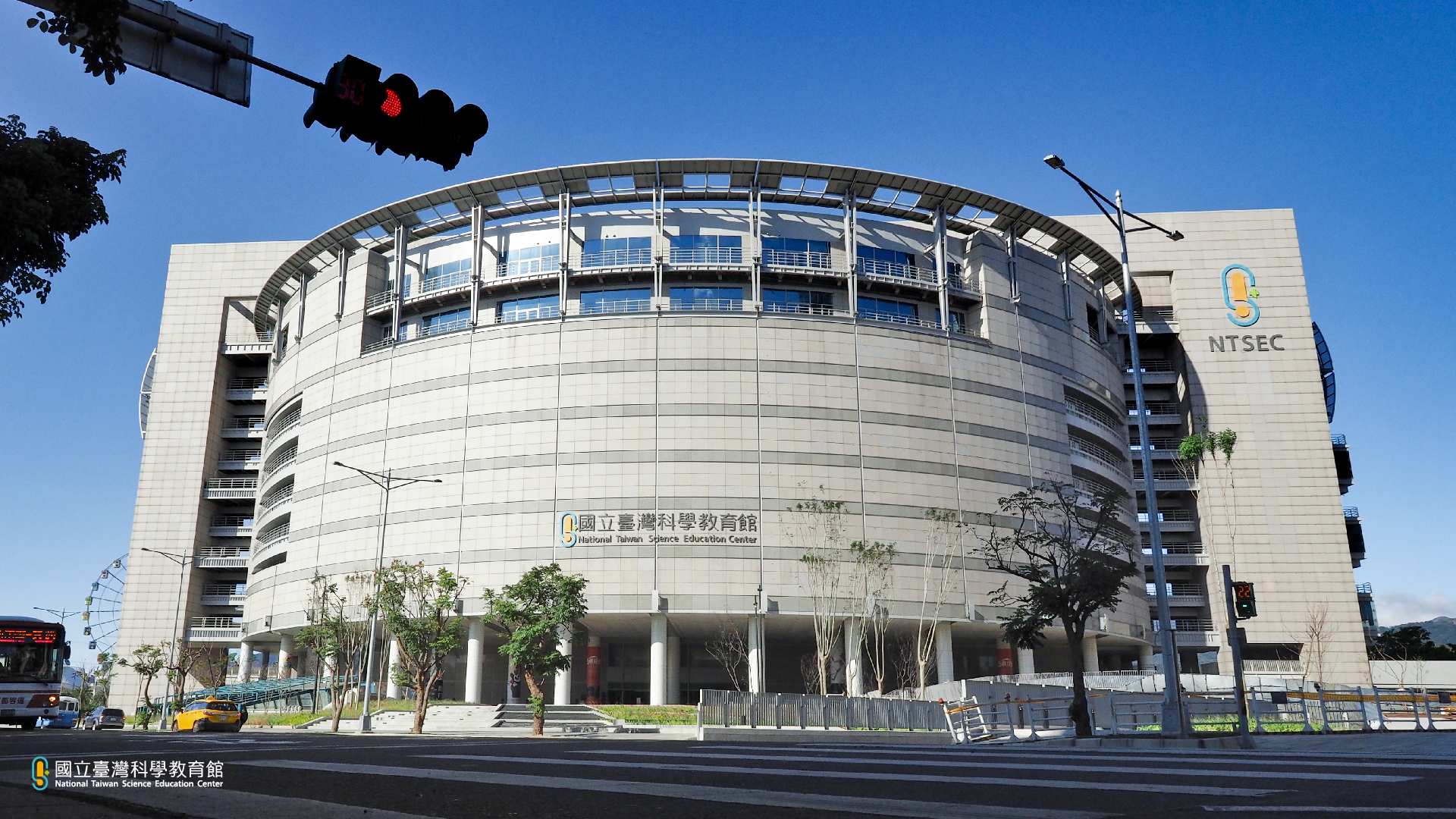
- Established: 1956 (Zhongzheng District); 2003 (Shilin District)
- Location: No. 189 Shihshang Road, Shilin, Taipei, Taiwan
- Coordinates: 25.0546°N 121.3100°E
- Type: Science Centre
- Accreditation: Asia Pacific Network of Science & Technology Centres (ASPAC)
- Directors: Liu, Huoo-Chin
- Owner: Ministry of Education
- Website: National Taiwan Science Education Center

The National Taiwan Science Education Center (NTSEC; traditional Chinese: 國立臺灣科學教育館; simplified Chinese: 国立台湾科学教育馆; pinyin: Guólì Táiwān Kēxué Jiàoyùguǎn) is an educational center in Shilin District, Taipei, Taiwan. The mission of the center is to promote the teaching of applied science throughout Taiwan.

== History ==
NTSEC was established in 1956 in Zhongzheng District, Taipei. In 2003, it moved to its current location in Shilin District to its current place today.

== Architecture ==
The NTSEC building is a 11-story building consists of theaters, laboratories, lobby, restaurant, life science exhibition area, materials science exhibition area, mathematics and earth science exhibition area, temporary exhibitions galleries, library and administration area.

== Exhibitions ==
The center displays permanent exhibitions on life science, physics, chemistry, mathematics, and earth sciences. On an attraction called the Sky Bike, visitors can cycle the length of the building on a wire 20 meters in the air.

== Transportation ==
The museum is accessible within walking distance northwest from Shilin Station of the Taipei Metro.

== See also ==
- List of tourist attractions in Taiwan
- List of science centers#Asia
