= Taipei Astronomical Museum =

Museum in Shilin, Taipei, Taiwan

- 臺北市立天文科學教育館
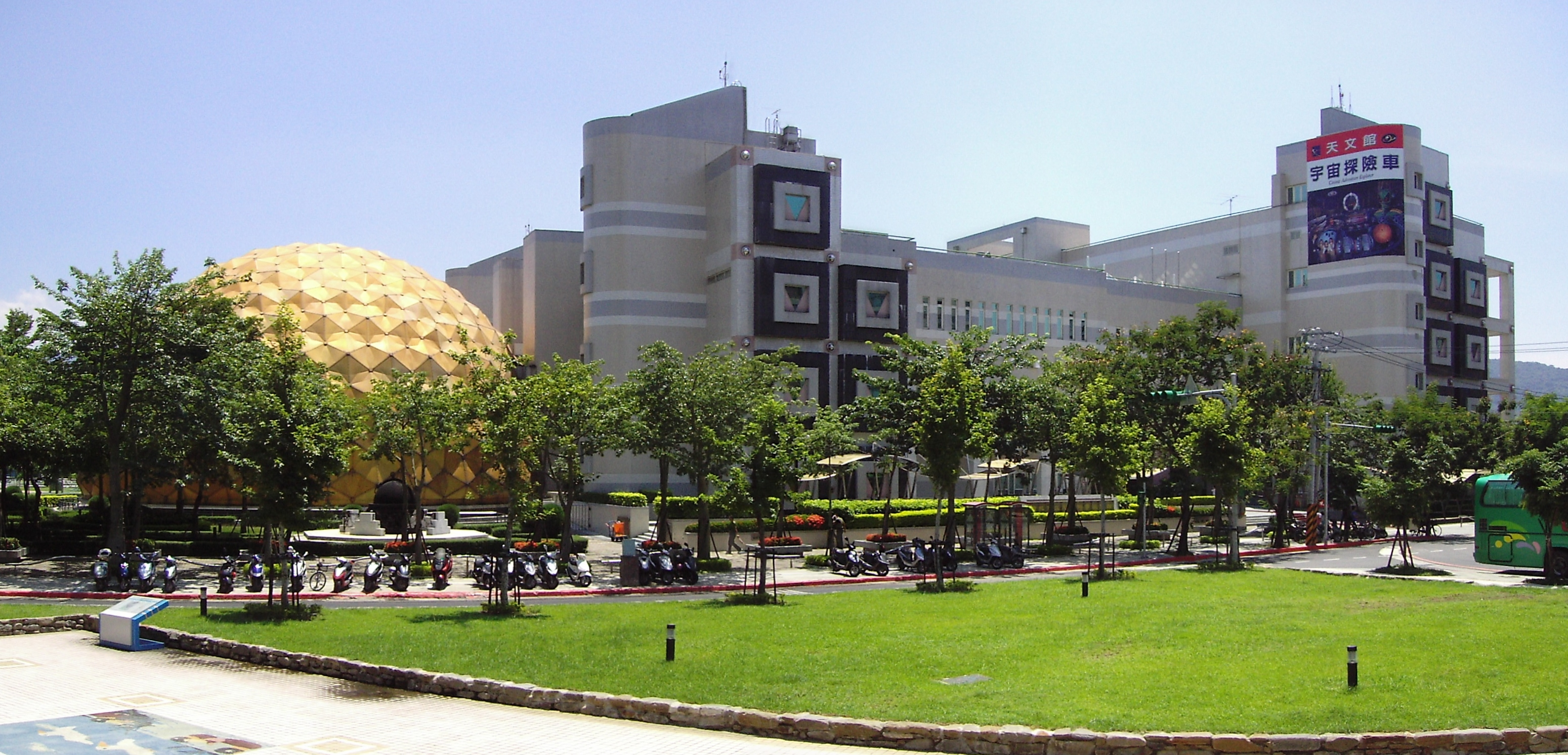
- Established: 7 November 1996
- Location: Shilin, Taipei, Taiwan
- Coordinates: 25°05′45″N 121°31′06″E
- Type: museum
- Public transit access: Shilin Station
- Website: Official website

The Taipei Astronomical Museum (traditional Chinese: 臺北市立天文科學教育館; simplified Chinese: 台北市立天文科学教育馆; pinyin: Táiběishìlì Tiānwén Kēxué Jiàoyùguǎn) is a museum in Shilin District, Taipei, Taiwan.

The museum took over the responsibilities of the Taipei City Observatory. The dome at the museum consists of geometrically identical pieces.

== History ==
The museum was opened on 7 November 1996.

== Exhibitions ==
The museum includes the following exhibition areas:

- Ancient Astronomy
- Celestial Sphere and Constellation Exhibit
- Cosmology
- Space Technology
- Stars Area
- Telescope and Observatory Area
- The Earth
- The Galaxies
- The Solar System

The museum also has a domed theater.

== Transportation ==
The museum is accessible within walking distance northwest from Shilin Station of Taipei Metro.

== Asteroid ==
Asteroid 300300 TAM, discovered by astronomers Hung-Chin Lin and Ye Quan-Zhi in 2007, was named for the Taipei Astronomical Museum. The official naming citation was published by the Minor Planet Center on 9 January 2020 (M.P.C. 120069).

== See also ==
- List of museums in Taiwan
