= Shihlin Paper Mill =

Paper mill in Shilin, Taipei, Taiwan

- 士林紙廠
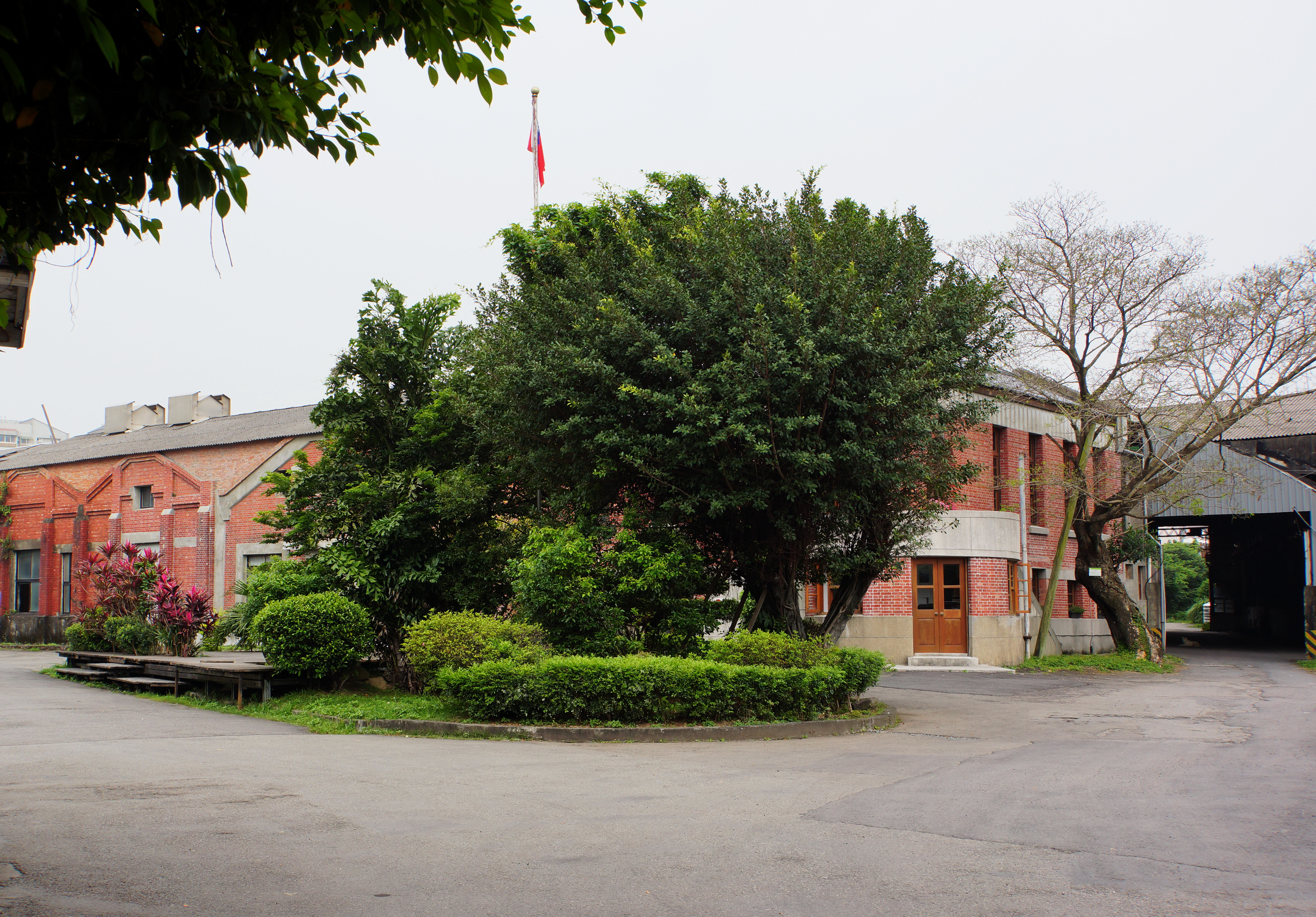
- The mill in 2013

Paper mill
- Location: Shilin, Taipei, Taiwan
- Coordinates: 25°05′N 121°31′E

Construction
- Completed: 1919

The Shihlin Paper Mill (simplified Chinese: 士林纸厂; traditional Chinese: 士林紙廠; pinyin: Shìlín Zhǐ Chǎng) is a historical paper mill in Shilin District, Taipei, Taiwan.

== History ==
=== Empire of Japan ===
In 1918, while Taiwan was under Japanese rule, the plan to establish a paper mill was initiated by Japanese merchants. In 1919, the paper mill was established under the corporation name Taiwan Paper K.K. which became the first paper mill in Taiwan.

=== Republic of China ===
After the retreat of the Republic of China to Taiwan, the government took over the paper mill with the other four mills around Taiwan. They merged them into the Taiwan Paper Corporation which then became a state-owned enterprise under the Ministry of Economic Affairs. At the end of 1954, the corporation was privatized and renamed Taiwan Paper Co., Ltd.; subsequently, the mill was renamed Shihlin Mill of Taiwan Paper Co., Ltd. In 1954, Taiwan Paper Corporation was divided into several parts and managed separately; the Shihlin Mill was acquired by the private sector. In 1959, the mill was renamed Shihlin Paper Co., Ltd. In 1998, in order to accommodate the expansion of urban development throughout Shilin, the production center of the mill was moved to Taoyuan County. In 2003, the mill and its related lands and buildings were transferred to its subsidiary, Sunshine Shihlin Development Co., Ltd. for redevelopment.

== Transportation ==
The mill is accessible within walking distance southwest of Shilin Station of Taipei Metro.

== See also ==
- List of tourist attractions in Taiwan
