= Yutang =

Yutang may refer to:

- Bai Yutang, fictional character from the Chinese novel The Seven Heroes and Five Gallants
- Li Yutang (1899–1951), Chinese general
- Lin Yutang (1895–1976), Chinese inventor, linguist, novelist, philosopher, and translator
- Lin Yutang House, former residence of Lin Yutang in Taipei, Taiwan
- Yutang, Yunnan, a town in Mojiang Hani Autonomous County, Yunnan, China
