= Shilin District =

District in Taipei, Taiwan

Coordinates: 25.0833°N 121.517°E

Shilin 士林區
- District
- Shilin District
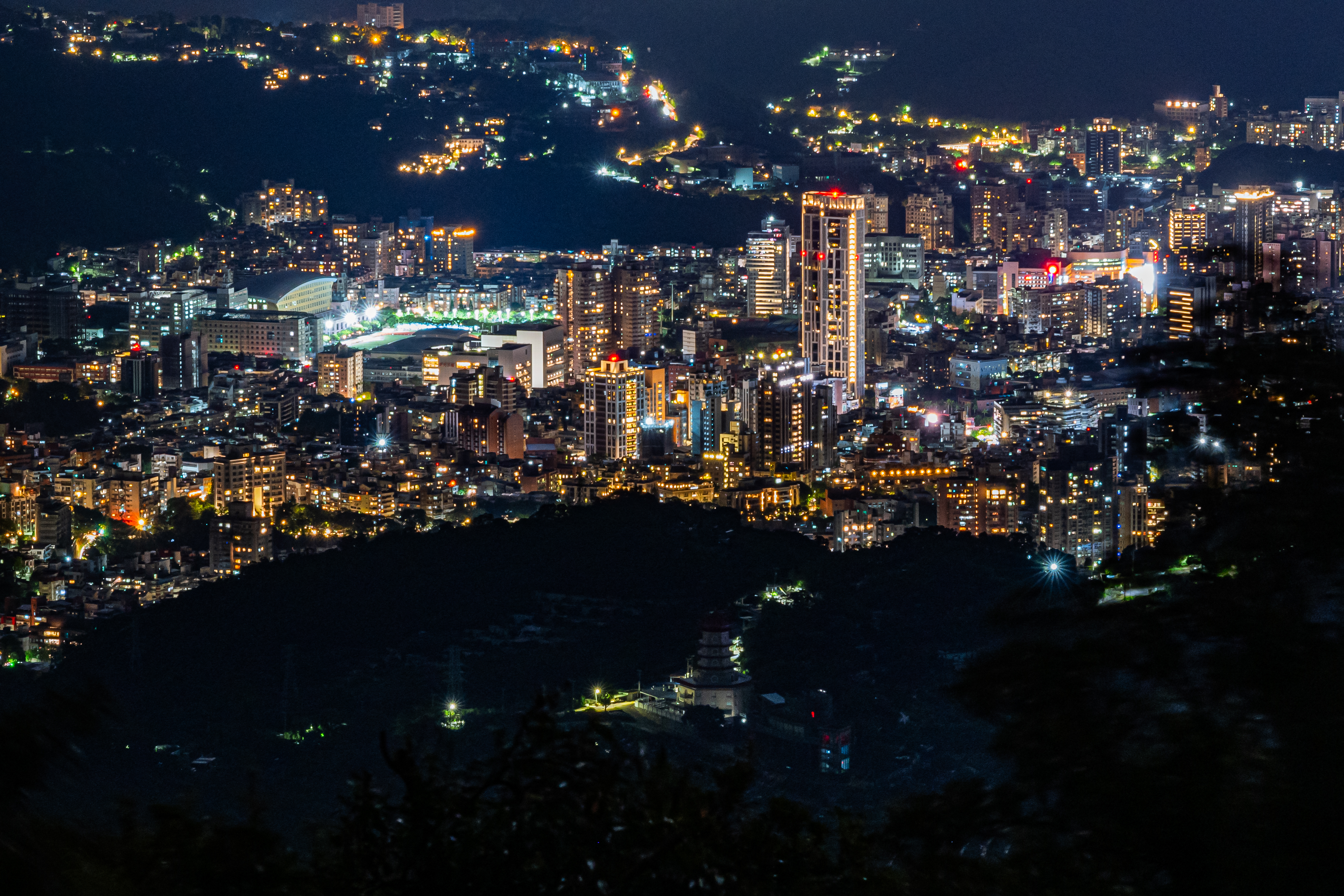
- Night cityscape of Shilin

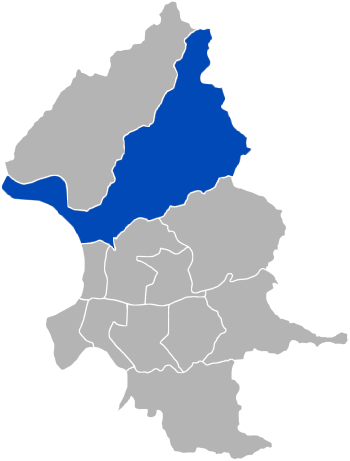
- Country: Taiwan
- Region: Northern Taipei
- Divisions: List: 51 villages; 988 neighborhoods

Area
  - Total: 62.3682 km^{2} (24.0805 sq mi)
  - Rank: Ranked 1st of 12

Population (January 2023)
  - Total: 265,462
  - Rank: Ranked 2nd of 12
  - Density: 4,256.37/km^{2} (11,023.9/sq mi)
- Postal code: 111
- Website: sldo.gov.taipei (in Chinese)

Shilin District

Chinese name
- Traditional Chinese: 士林區
- Simplified Chinese: 士林区
Transcriptions
Standard Mandarin
- Hanyu Pinyin: Shìlín Qū
Southern Min
- Hokkien POJ: Sū-lîm-khu

Alternative Chinese name
- Traditional Chinese: 八芝蘭
- Simplified Chinese: 八芝兰
Transcriptions
Standard Mandarin
- Hanyu Pinyin: Bāzhīlán
Southern Min
- Hokkien POJ: Pat-chi-lân

Ketagalan name
- Ketagalan: Pattsiran

Hakka name
- Hakka: Sṳ-lìm-khî
- (Ketagalan word for "hot spring"; transliterated into Chinese as "八芝蘭" Bāzhīlán) (old name)

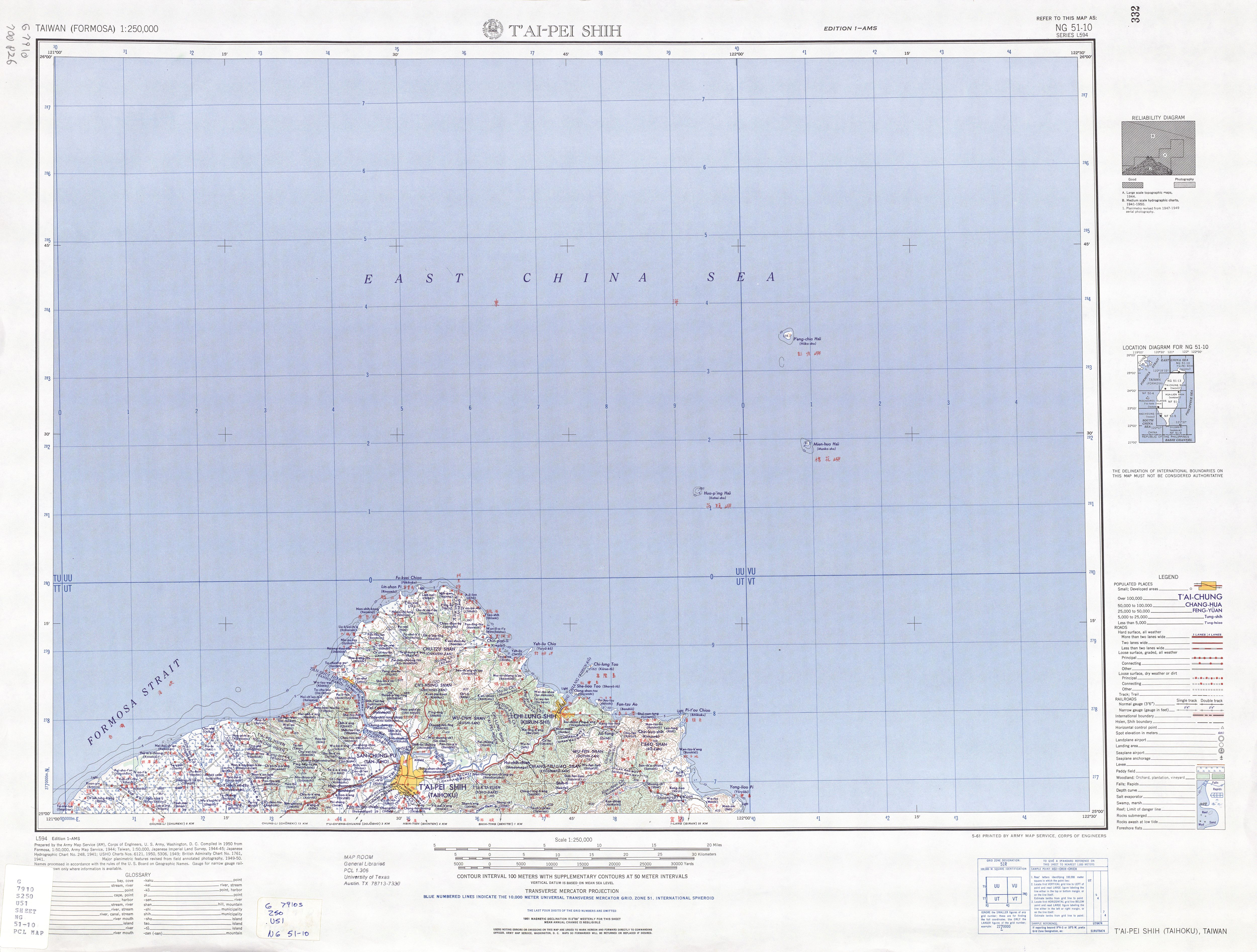
Map including Shilin (labeled as Shih-lin-chuang (Shirinshō) 士林庄) (1950)

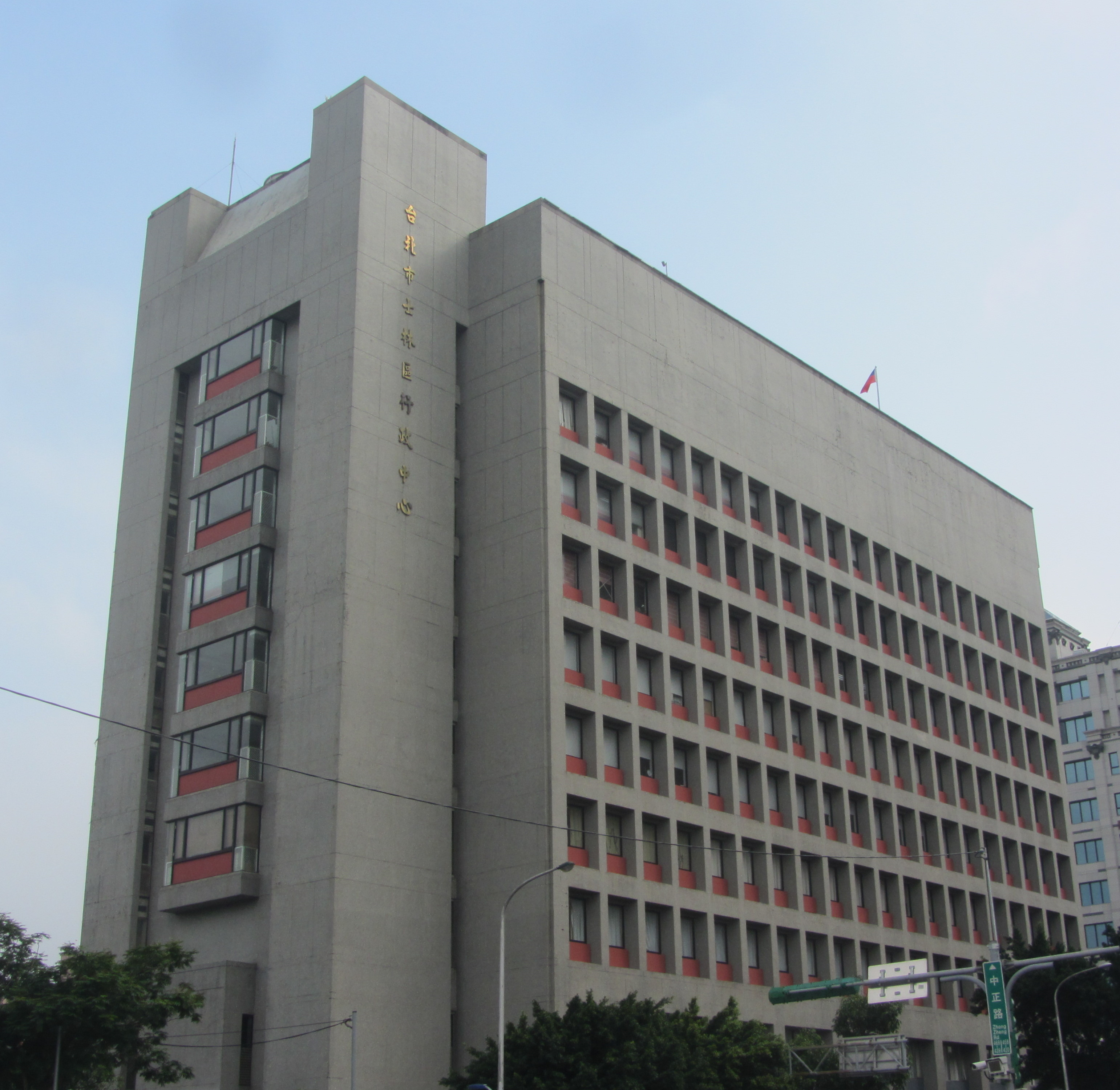
Shilin District office

Shilin District (also spelled Shihlin District, Chinese: 士林區; pinyin: Shìlínqū; Pe̍h-ōe-jī: Sū-lîm-khu) is a district of Taipei. The central command center of the Republic of China Navy (ROCN) is located in Shilin.

== History ==
The name Shilin was derived from Pattsiran, the indigenous Ketagalan word for "hot springs". It was then transliterated into Chinese as "八芝蘭" (pinyin: Bāzhīlán; Pe̍h-ōe-jī: Pat-chi-lân), which has been written as Pat-chi-na or Pachina.

Prior to Han Chinese settlement, the area was home to the Kimassauw community (麻少翁社) of the Taiwanese indigenous peoples. During the Qing era, a fort was set up, later called Zhilan Yi Bao (first fort/settlement of Pattsiran, 芝蘭一堡). By the late Qing dynasty, "many literary talents from Shilin had passed the imperial examination", prompting the local gentry to rename it Shilin (士林), meaning "congregation of scholars and talents".

In the 1920s under Japanese colonial rule, the area was organized as Shirin Village (士林庄) and in 1933 Shirin Town (士林街), under Shichisei District (七星郡), Taihoku Prefecture. In 1945 after World War II, it was modified to Shilin Township (士林鎭), Taipei County (臺北縣).

Shilin is foremost a residential district and has several famous neighborhoods, such as Waishuangxi (外雙溪) and Tianmu. Kuomintang leader Chiang Kai-shek lived in Shilin after moving the Chinese Nationalist government to Taiwan after the Chinese Civil War. The district is divided up into 51 villages (里), which are further divided up into 987 neighborhoods (鄰).

The district can be said to be the origin of culture in Taipei. During the Qing Dynasty, many private, public and community schools were opened in the area. During the Japanese era, a national learning center was set up at Zhishanyan.

== Education ==
Chinese Culture University

Shilin has three universities: Ming Chuan University, Soochow University, and the Chinese Culture University. Several international schools, including the Taipei American School, Taipei Japanese School, The Primacy Collegiate Academy and Taipei European School are located in this district. The district is also home to two vocational colleges, four senior high schools, eight junior high schools, and twenty elementary schools.

The National Taiwan Science Education Center is also located in this district, along with the Taipei Astronomical Museum, the Shung Ye Museum of Formosan Aborigines, and the National Palace Museum.

== Institutions ==
- Commercial Office of Brazil to Taipei
- Embassy of Eswatini in Taipei

== Tourism ==
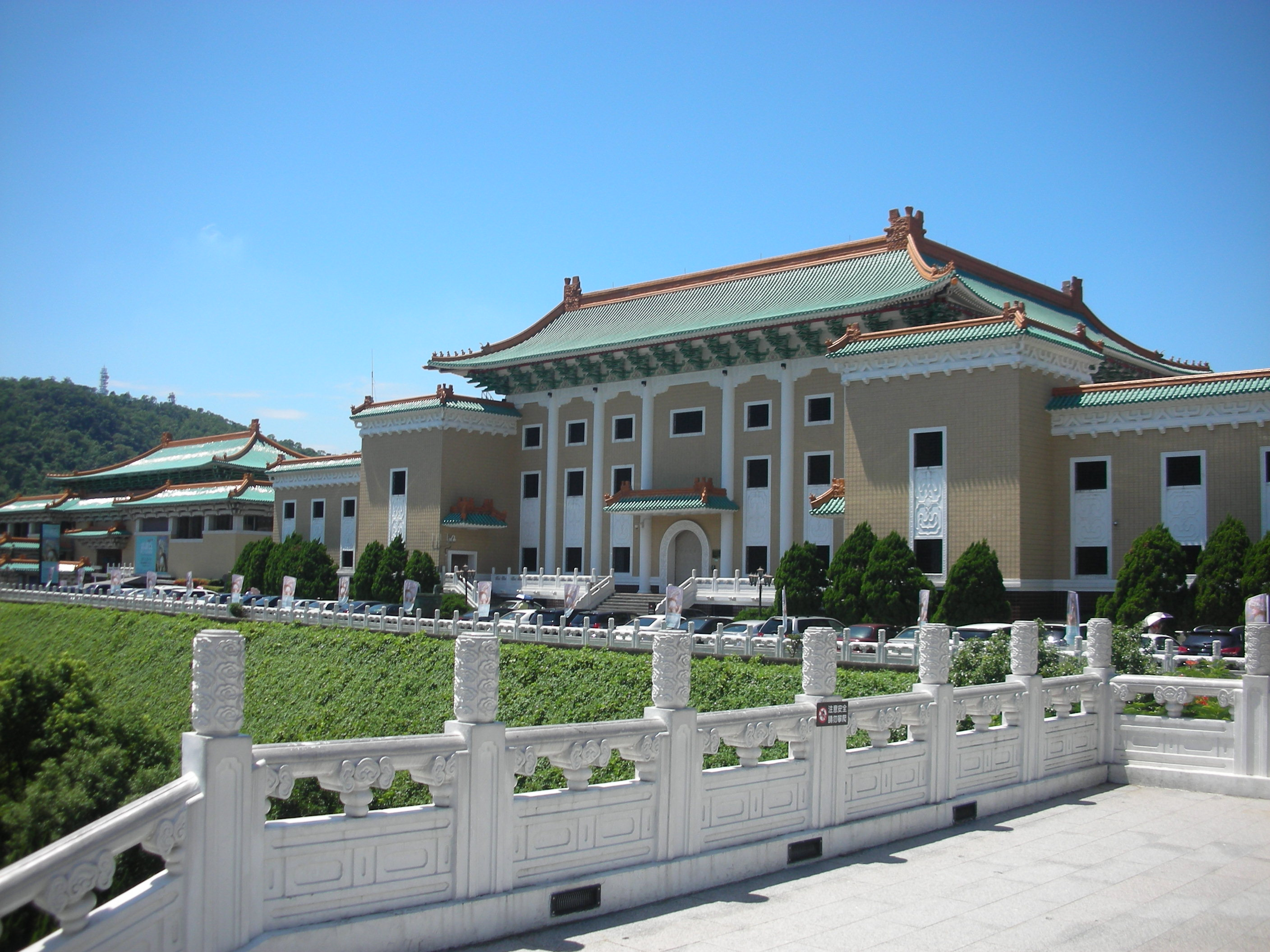
The National Palace Museum is home to over 600,000 ancient Chinese artifacts and artworks.

The district is home to many national historical sites, including historical temples, markets, and buildings. Tourist attractions include:

- Yangmingshan National Park
- Shihlin Paper Mill
- National Palace Museum
- Taipei Astronomical Museum
- National Taiwan Science Education Center
- Chien Mu House
- Hwa Kang Museum
- Chiang Kai-shek's Shilin Official Residence
- Shilin Shennong Temple
- Lin Yutang House
- Tianmu White House
- Taiwan Traditional Theatre Center
- Chih Shan Yen Hui Chi Temple
- Chih Shan Yen Gate
- Taipei Children's Amusement Park
- Shilin Night Market
- Shilin Cixian Temple

The Tatun Volcanic Group is located northeast of the district. The district is also the location of the Tianmu Baseball Stadium, Bailing Sport Park, Shilin Fitness Center and Chinese Culture and Movie Center. The Shuangxi Park and Chinese Garden is also located in Shilin.

== Transportation ==
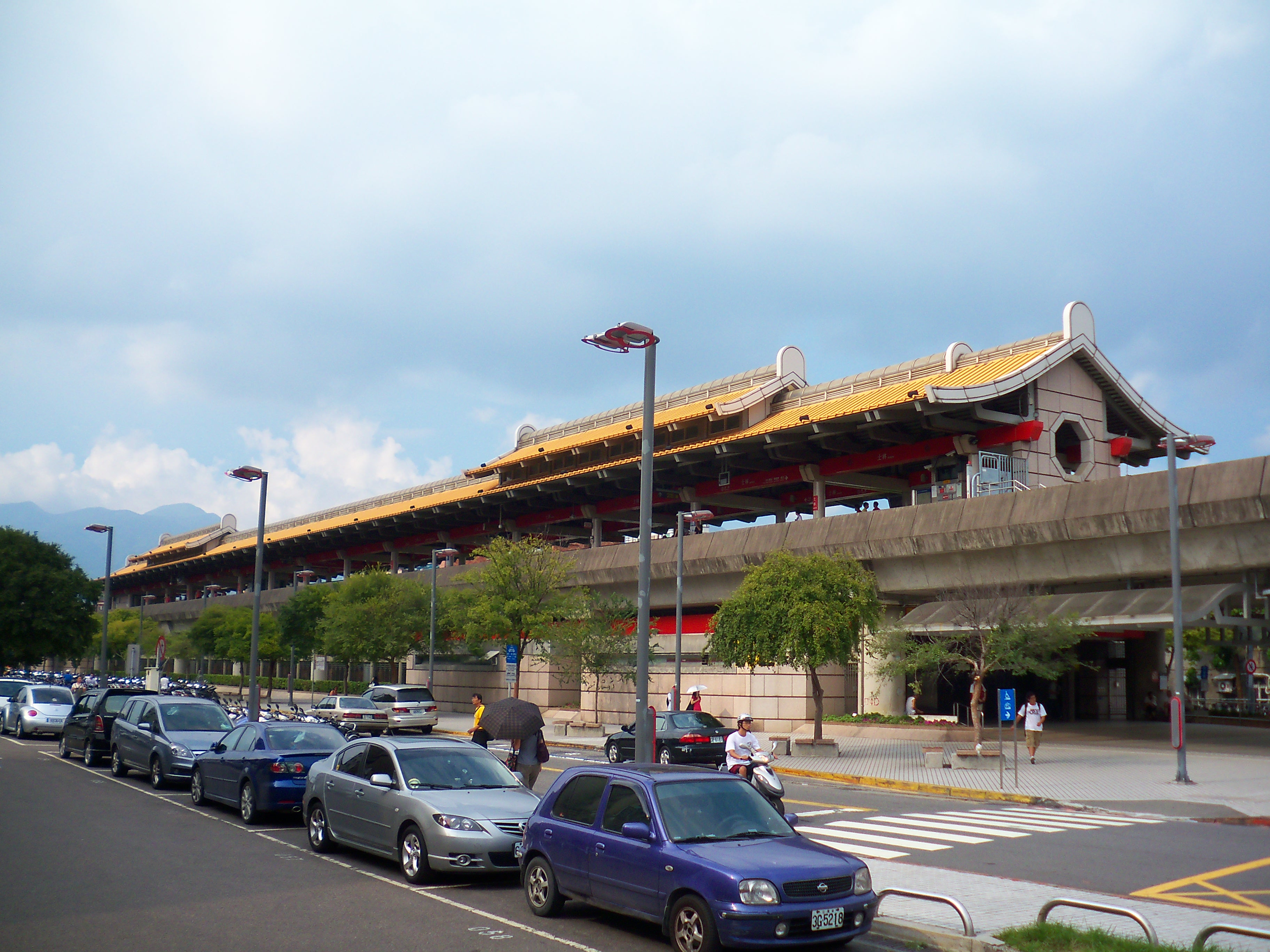
Shilin Station

In addition to many bus lines, the district is served by Jiantan, Shilin, and Zhishan metro stations of the Taipei Metro Tamsui-Xinyi Line. It is served by Provincial Highway No. 2A and 2B, as well as many other major roads that run through the city.

== Sister cities ==
- Los Altos, California, USA
- Walnut, California, USA

== Notable natives ==
- Chang Hsin-yan, actress
- Huang Ching-yin, politician
- Ko Chia-yen, actress
- Miu Chu, singer
- Selina Jen, singer and actress

== See also ==
- District (Taiwan)
