= Lin Yutang House =

Former residence in Shilin, Taipei, Taiwan

- 林語堂故居
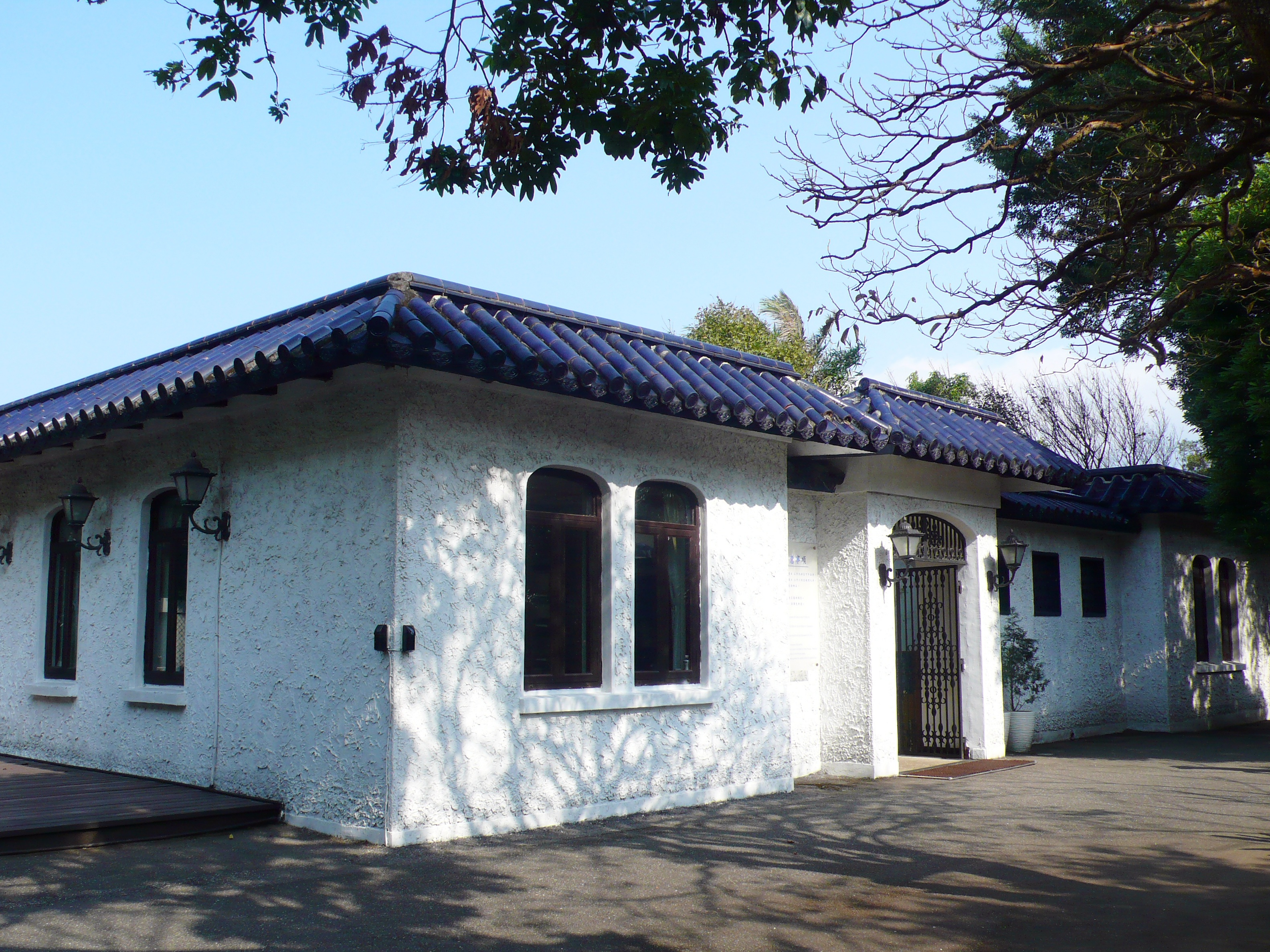
- Interactive map of the Lin Yutang House area

General information
- Type: former residence
- Location: Shilin, Taipei, Taiwan
- Coordinates: 25°06′35.0″N 121°32′49.0″E
- Completed: 1966

Design and construction
- Architect: Lin Yutang

Website
- Official website

The Lin Yutang House (traditional Chinese: 林語堂故居; simplified Chinese: 林语堂故居; pinyin: Lín Yǔtáng Gùjū) is a former residence in Shilin District, Taipei, Taiwan, that belonged to Lin Yutang.

== History ==
The house was constructed in 1966.

== Architecture ==
The house was designed by its owner Lin Yutang in a traditional Chinese style, with four walls enclosing an interior courtyard. It was constructed with blue tiles and white walls. The house consists of a small library displaying a collection of Lin's writings and photos of Lin.

== Transportation ==
The house is accessible by bus from Shilin Station of Taipei Metro.

== See also ==
- List of tourist attractions in Taiwan
