= Shung Ye Museum of Formosan Aborigines =

- 順益臺灣原住民博物館
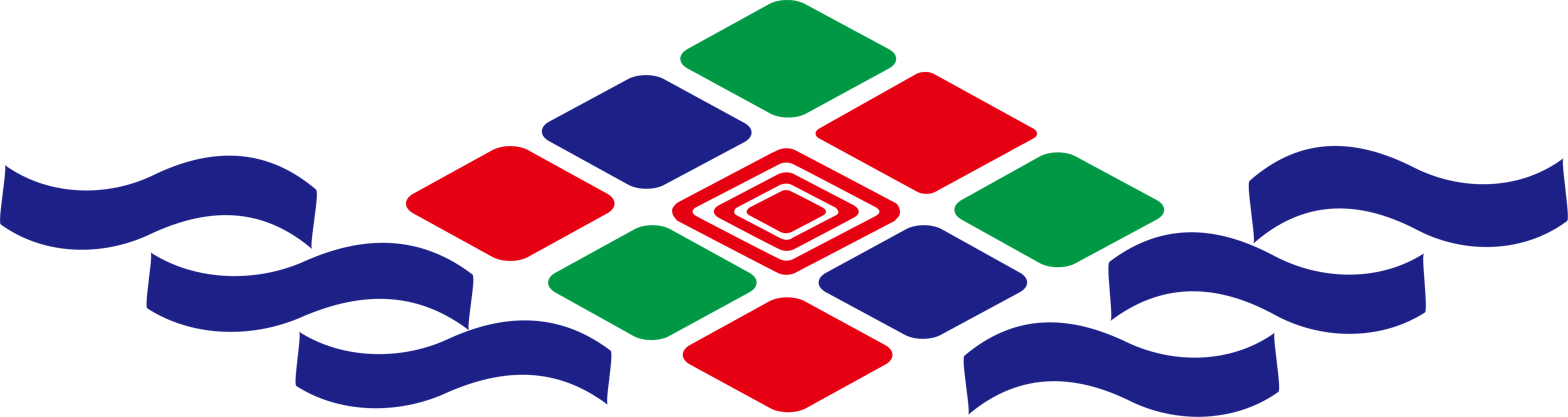

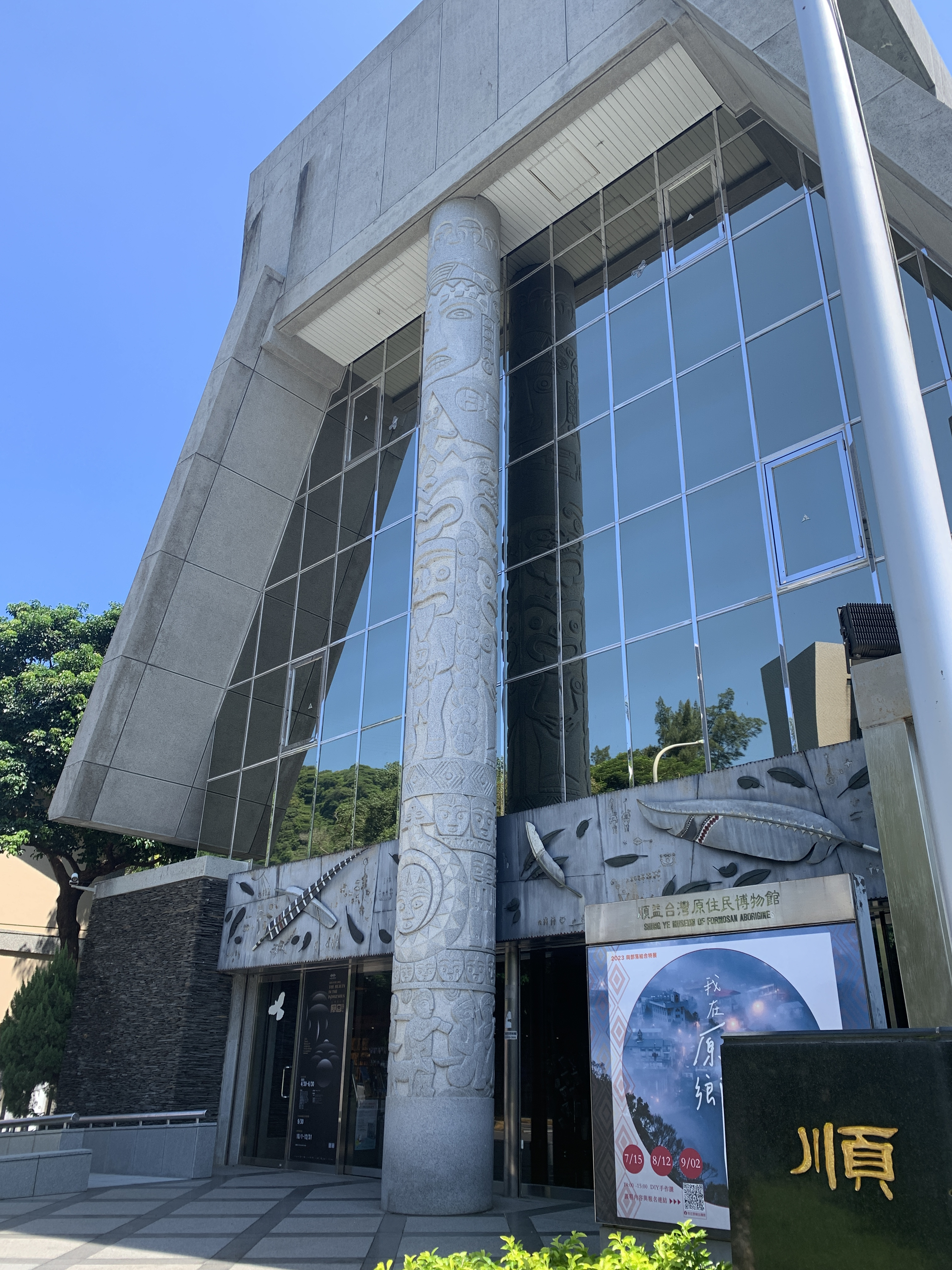
- Shung Ye Museum of Formosan Aborigines, Taipei, Taiwan
- Established: 9 June 1994
- Location: Shilin, Taipei, Taiwan
- Coordinates: 25°06′03.5″N 121°33′07.1″E
- Type: Private museum
- Collection size: 2,228 (2024)
- Visitors: ca. 18,000 (2023)
- Director: Eric H. Y. Yu (游浩乙)
- Architect: Kao Er-Pan (高而潘)
- Website: www.museum.org.tw

The Shung Ye Museum of Formosan Aborigines (Traditional Chinese: 順益台灣原住民博物館; Simplified Chinese: 顺益台湾原住民博物馆; Pinyin: Shùnyì Táiwān Yuánzhùmín Bówùguǎn) is the first private museum dedicated to the culture and history of the Taiwanese indigenous peoples. It is located just 200 metres diagonally across from the National Palace Museum in Shilin District, Taipei, Taiwan. The museum was officially opened in June 1994 and displays various types of artefacts from different indigenous tribes in Taiwan. The Formosan Aborigines live mainly in the mountainous regions of eastern and southern Taiwan and have historically spoken a variety of Austronesian languages. Both permanent and rotating exhibitions are a part of the museum.

== History ==
=== Early beginnings ===
In 1985, Lin Qing-Fu (林清富), Chairmen of the Shung Ye Group established the Shung Ye Museum of Formosan Aborigines under the Lin Nai-Weng (林迺翁) Foundation for Culture and Education, which was named after his father. More than 20 years of Lin's personal collection of indigenous artefacts have been donated to the museum. With the donated artefacts, the Shung Ye Museum of Formosan Aborigines began field studies and research and continued to collect artefacts from overseas and donations from those interested in Formosan Aboriginal culture.

=== Sponsorships ===
Over time, sponsorships have been organised to promote research into Taiwan's indigenous cultures. As early as 1991, the museum began working with the Anthropology Department of National Taiwan University and in 1993, scholarships were awarded to indigenous students at National Chengchi University and National Tsing Hua University to encourage more anthropological research in support of local indigenous cultures.

Overseas, the University of California Berkeley, the University of Tokyo, the University of Oxford and the Leiden University have also been involved in compiling relevant information and research documents on Taiwan's indigenous peoples.

== Architecture ==
=== Main building ===
The museum was designed by architect Kao Er-Pan (高而潘) and follows the concept of indigenous housing. Local and natural materials were chosen to form the base of the main building of the museum. Slates of similar thickness were stacked on the exterior wall to give an exquisite look without losing the original touch.

=== Totem pole ===
The carved totem pole by Kuo Qing-Chi (郭清治), which stands in front of the museum, is 1.1 metres in diameter and 13.2 metres high. Weighing over 18 tonnes of white granite, the totem pole represents the unique style of indigenous cultures in Taiwan and expresses the core principle of the museum.

=== The Lintel ===
Above the entrance to the museum hangs a stainless steel lintel called 'Honour', created by Sakuliu Pavavaljung, who is recognised as a master of contemporary Aboriginal art. The main source of the totem is the use of feathers, as they symbolise ultimate fame and influence.

== Collections ==
The museum contains a total of 2,228 (2024) objects, of which 1,819 are aboriginal objects and 409 are dedicated to Taiwanese painting. To separate the different artefacts and aspects of indigenous life, the museum is divided into four floors:

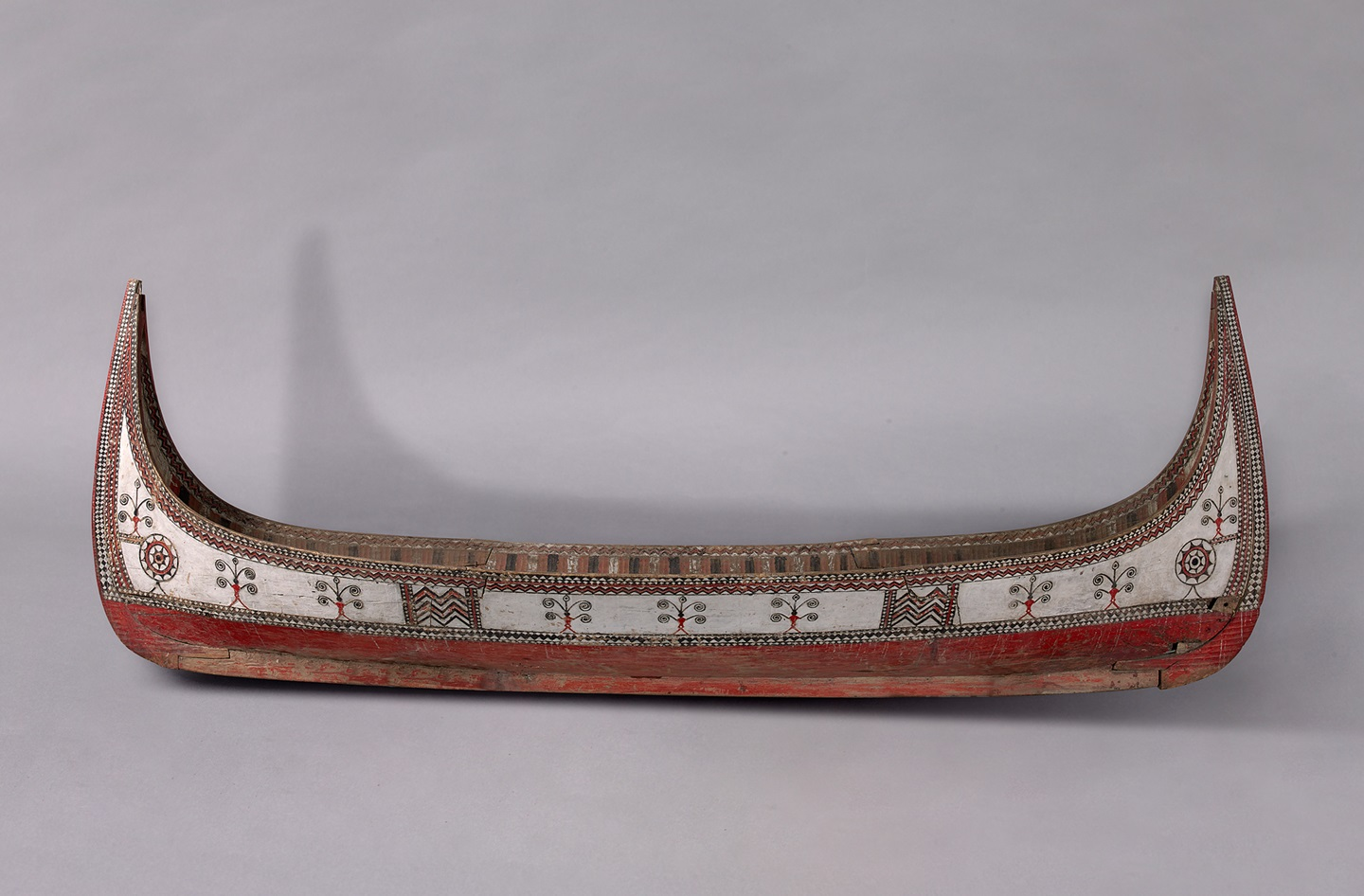
The ipanitika, a traditional Yami (Tao) boat

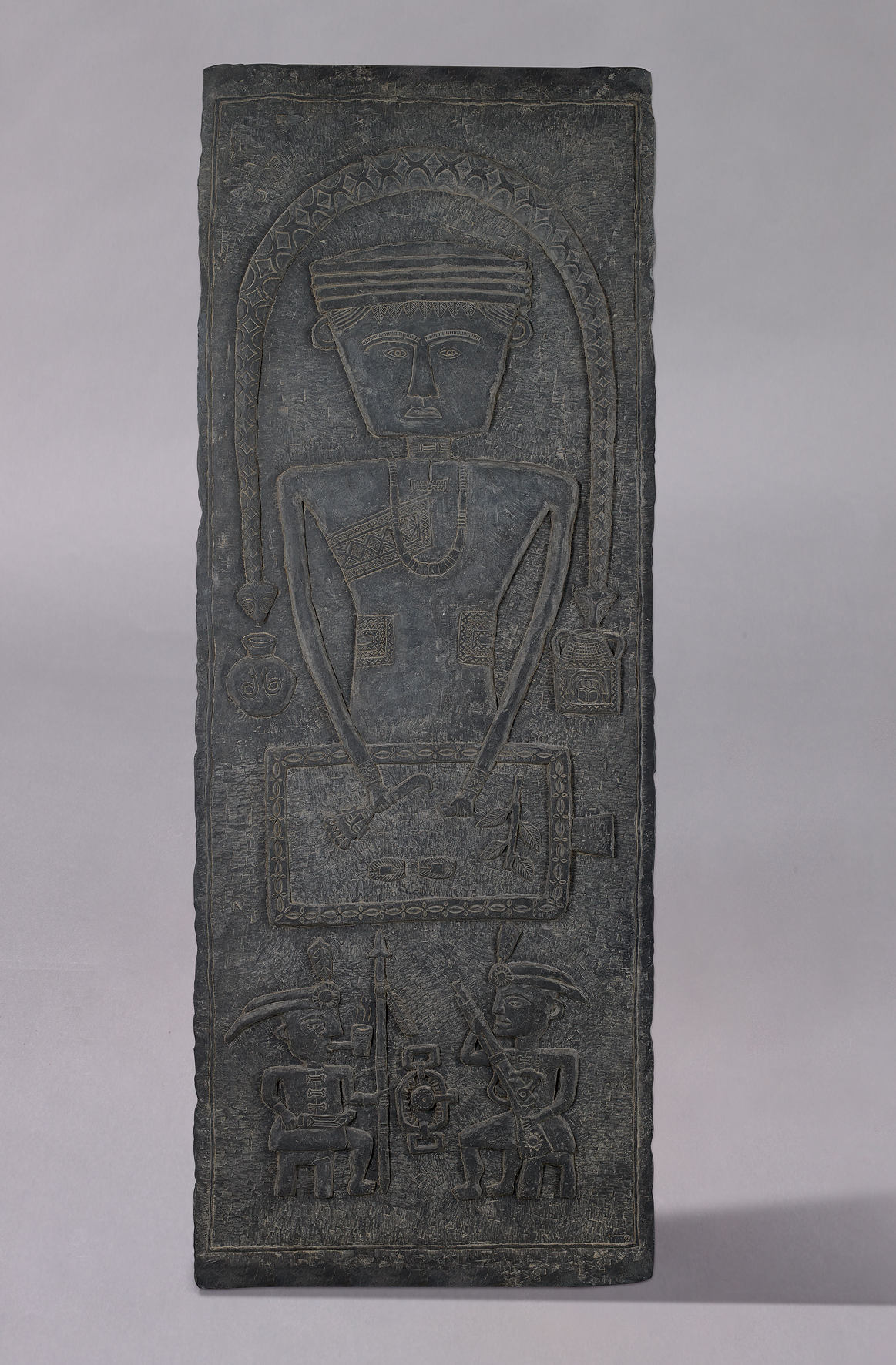
Paiwan Slate Sculpture by Sakuliu Pavavaljung

=== Basement floor ===
The basement is dedicated to the ceremonies and animistic beliefs of the Formosan Aborigines. There is information about the traditions of worshipping the spirits of the ancestors and the practice of headhunting.

=== First floor ===
On the first floor, there is a small introduction to Taiwan's indigenous groups and two major artefacts, the Yami (Tao) fishing boat and a Paiwan slate sculpture designed by Sakuliu Pavavaljung. There is also a music section that introduces visitors to Taiwan's indigenous music and songs.

=== Second floor ===
The second floor is devoted to indigenous livelihoods, tools and dwellings. There are ancestral poles and scale models of various dwellings of Taiwan's indigenous groups. There is also a small section on the importance of pottery in indigenous life. In addition, the floor offers a glimpse of the indigenous agricultural practices, the wickerwork, the drinking culture, carvings, the hunting weapons, the fishing tools and the traditional musical instruments.

=== Third floor ===
On the third floor, the museum displays various representative costumes of Taiwan's indigenous groups, as well as embroidery, weaving, decorative ornaments and accessories.

== Gallery ==
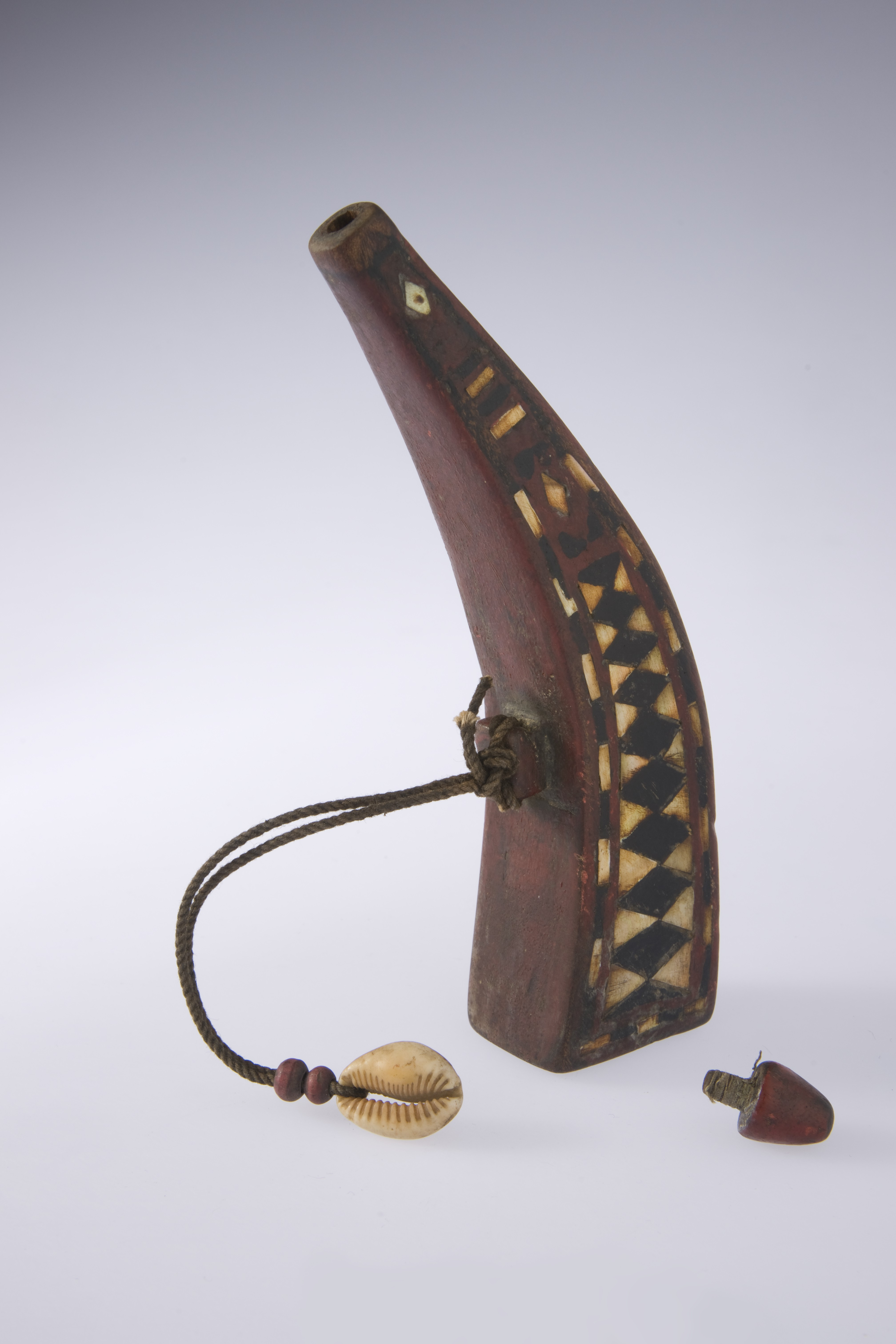
Gunpowder container (Paiwan)

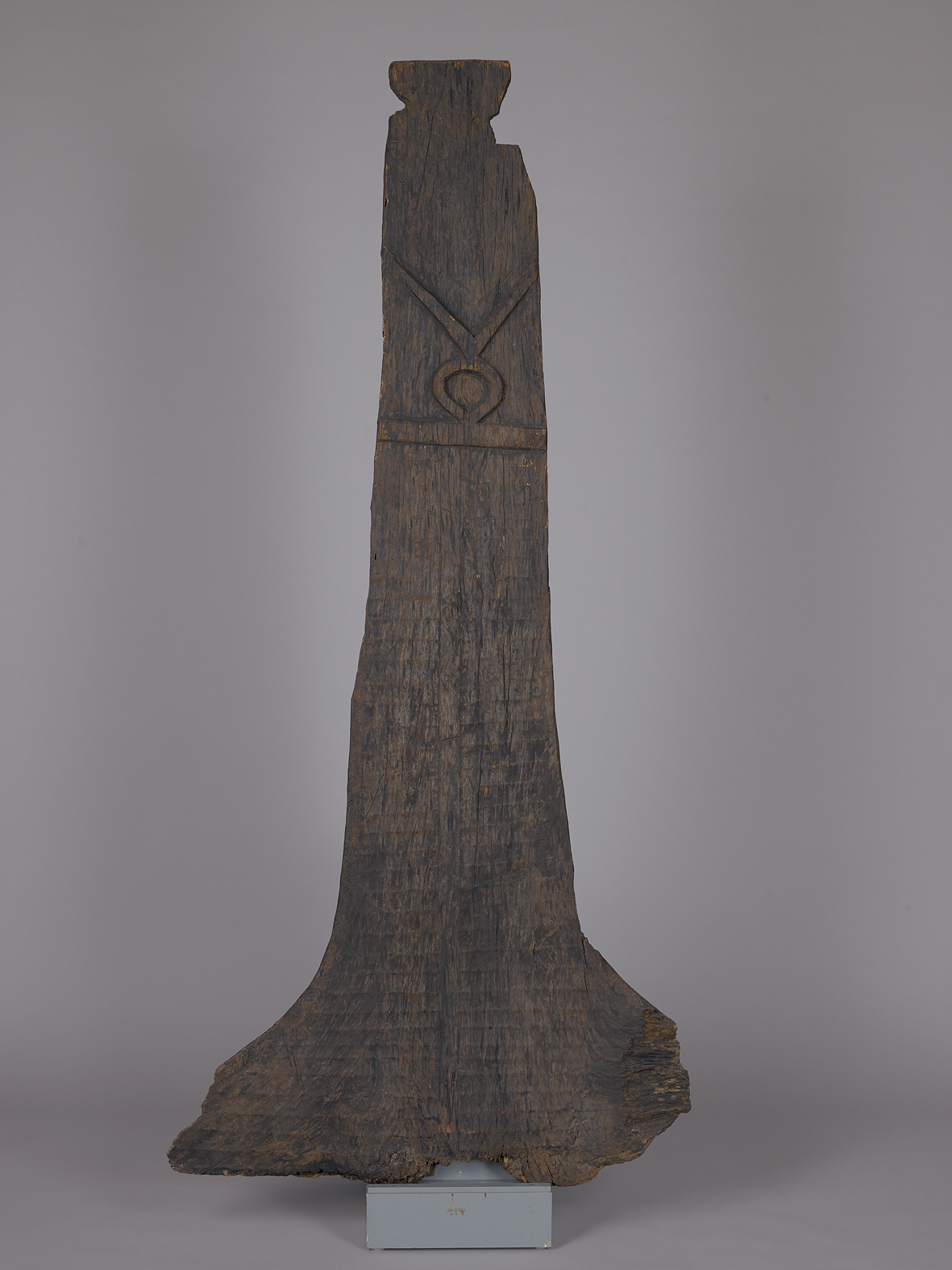
Ancient post (Paiwan)

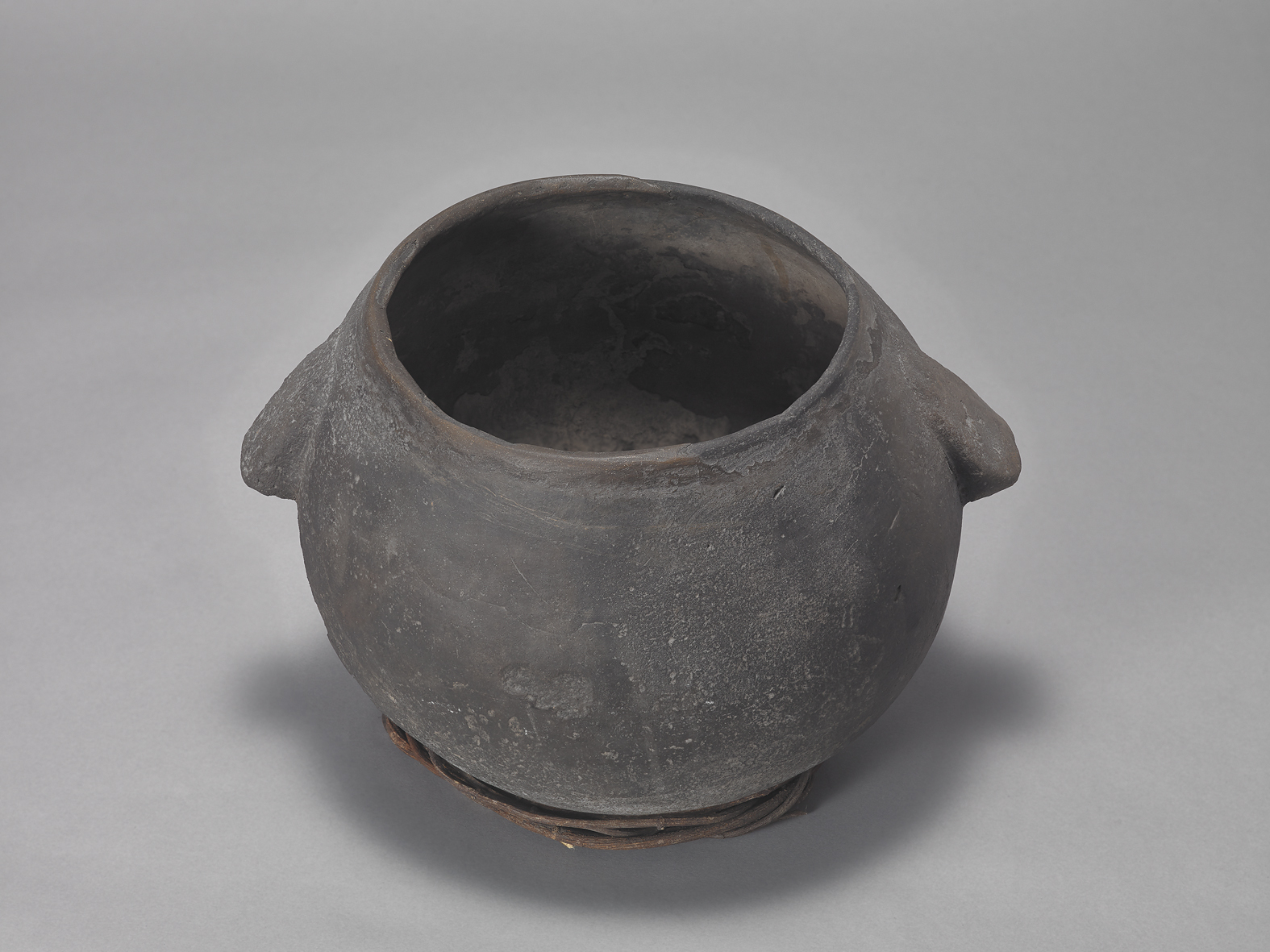
Pottery vessel (Amis)

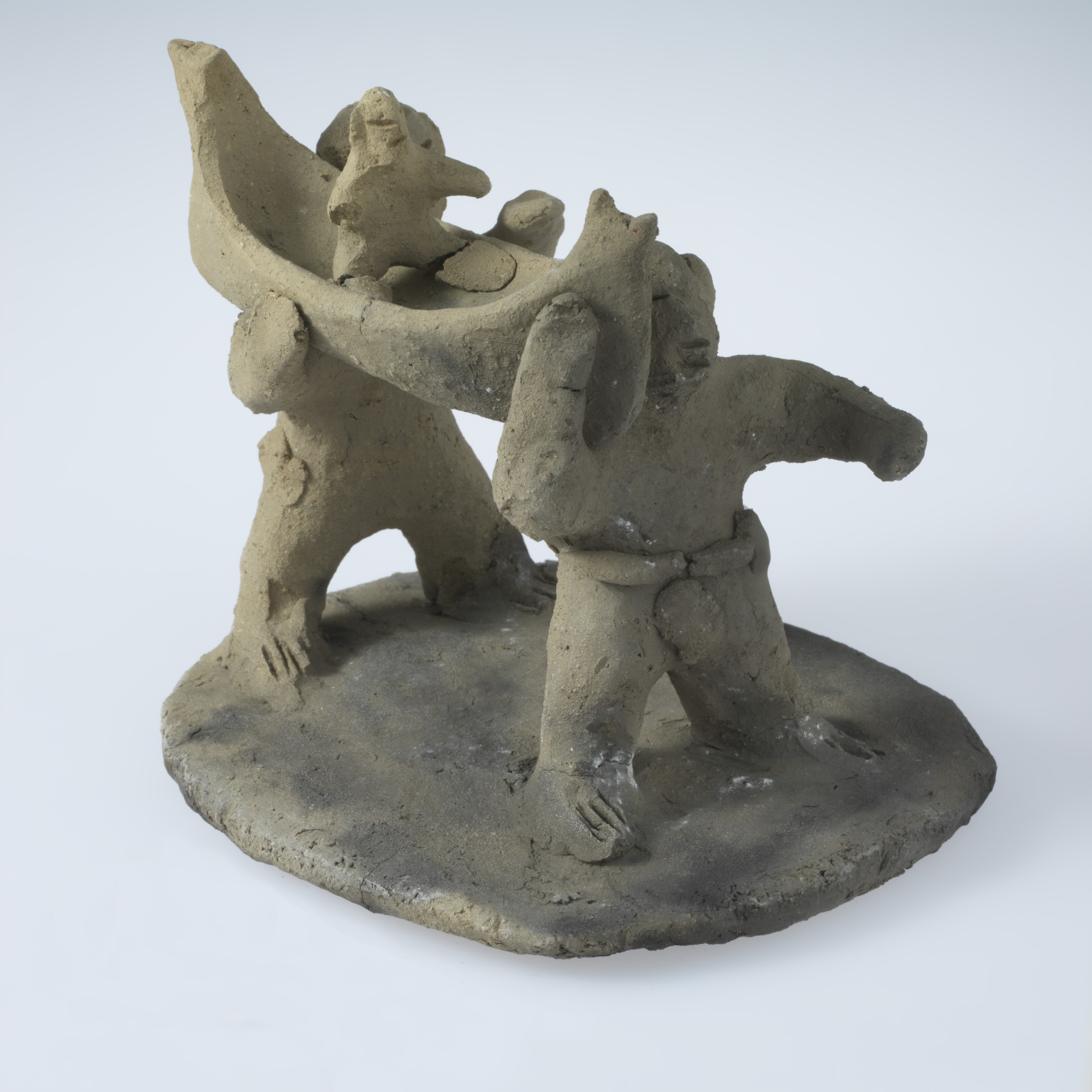
Earthenware dolls (Tao)

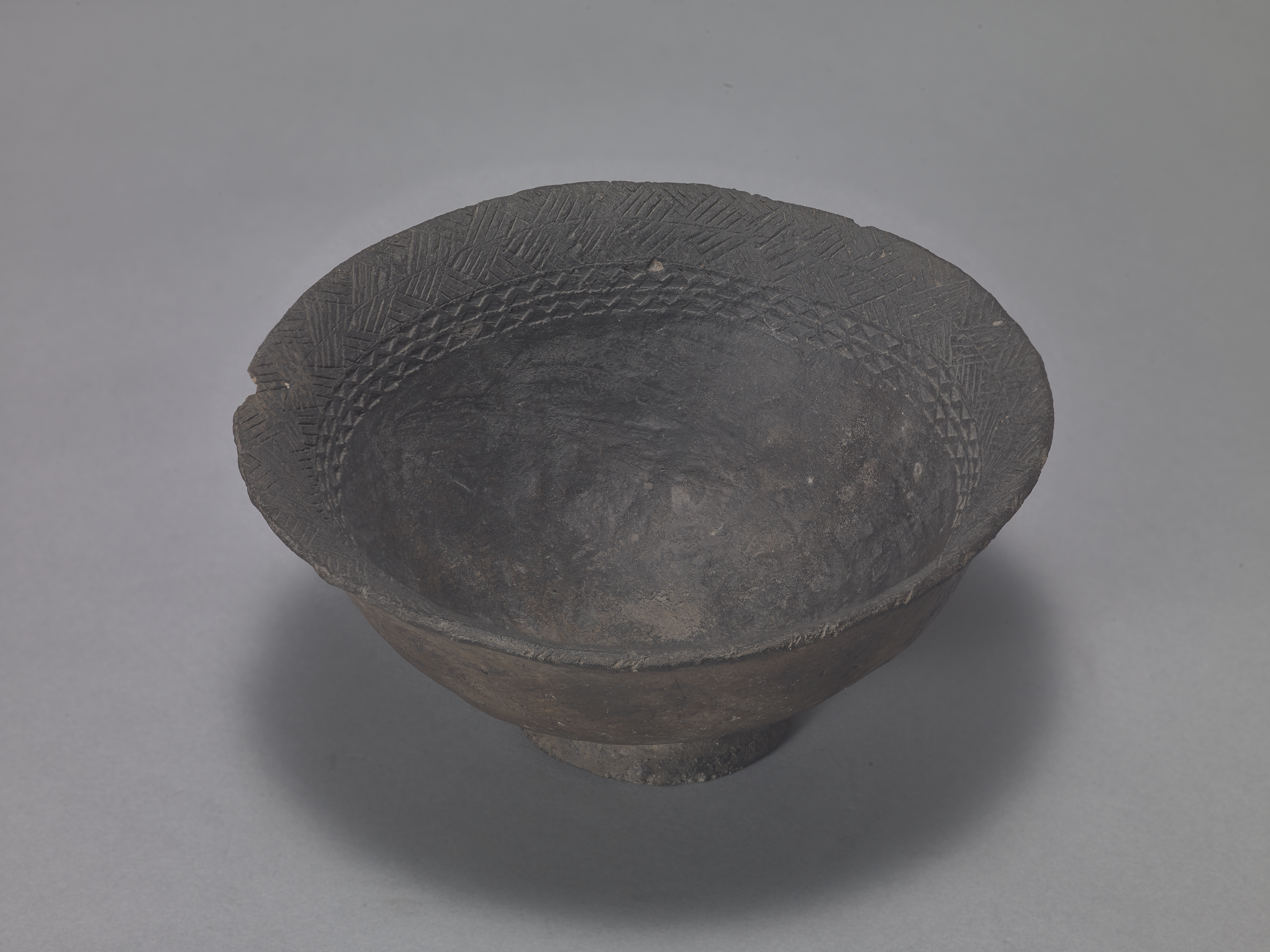
Bowl (Tao)

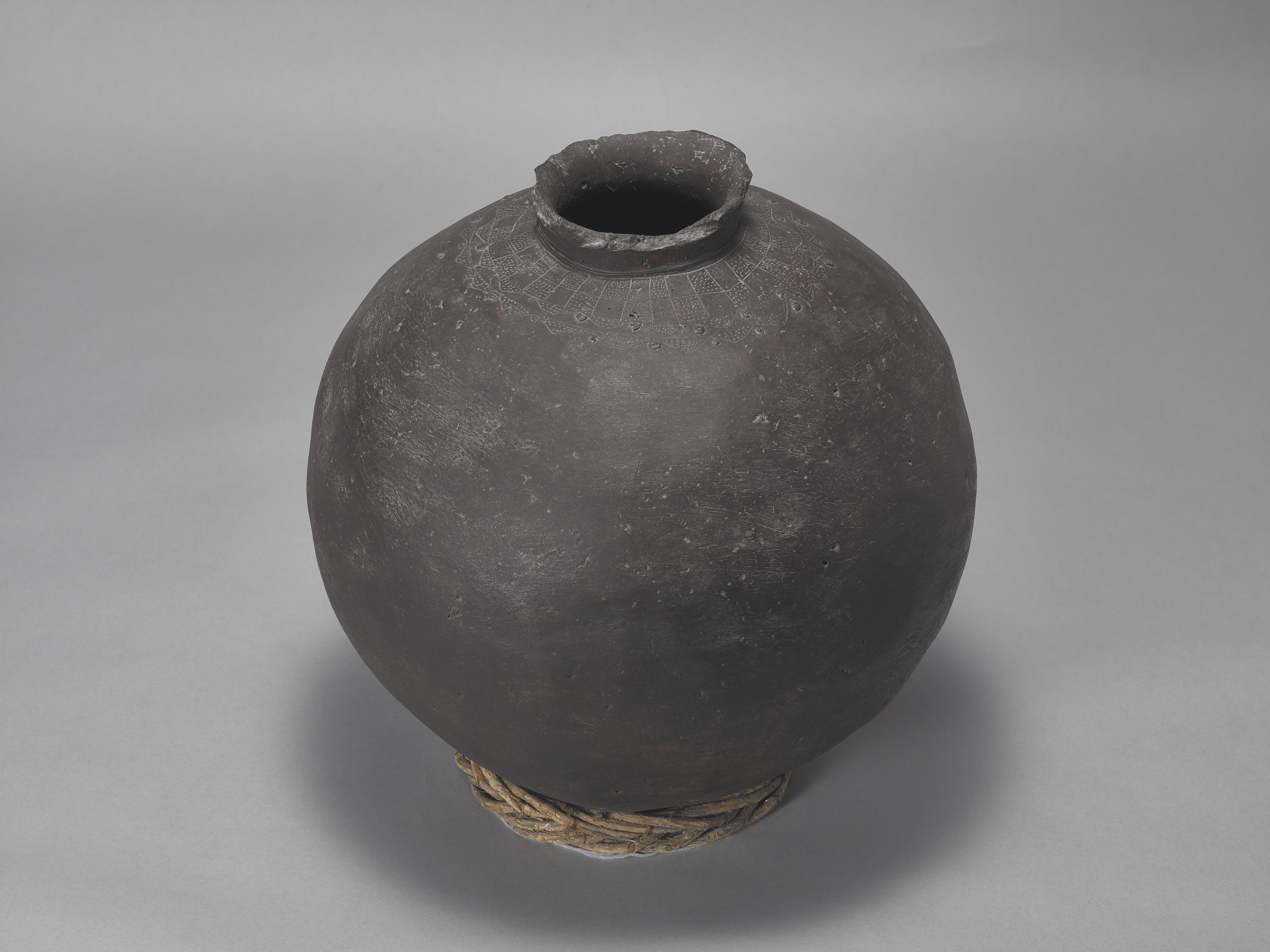
Ancient pot (Paiwan)

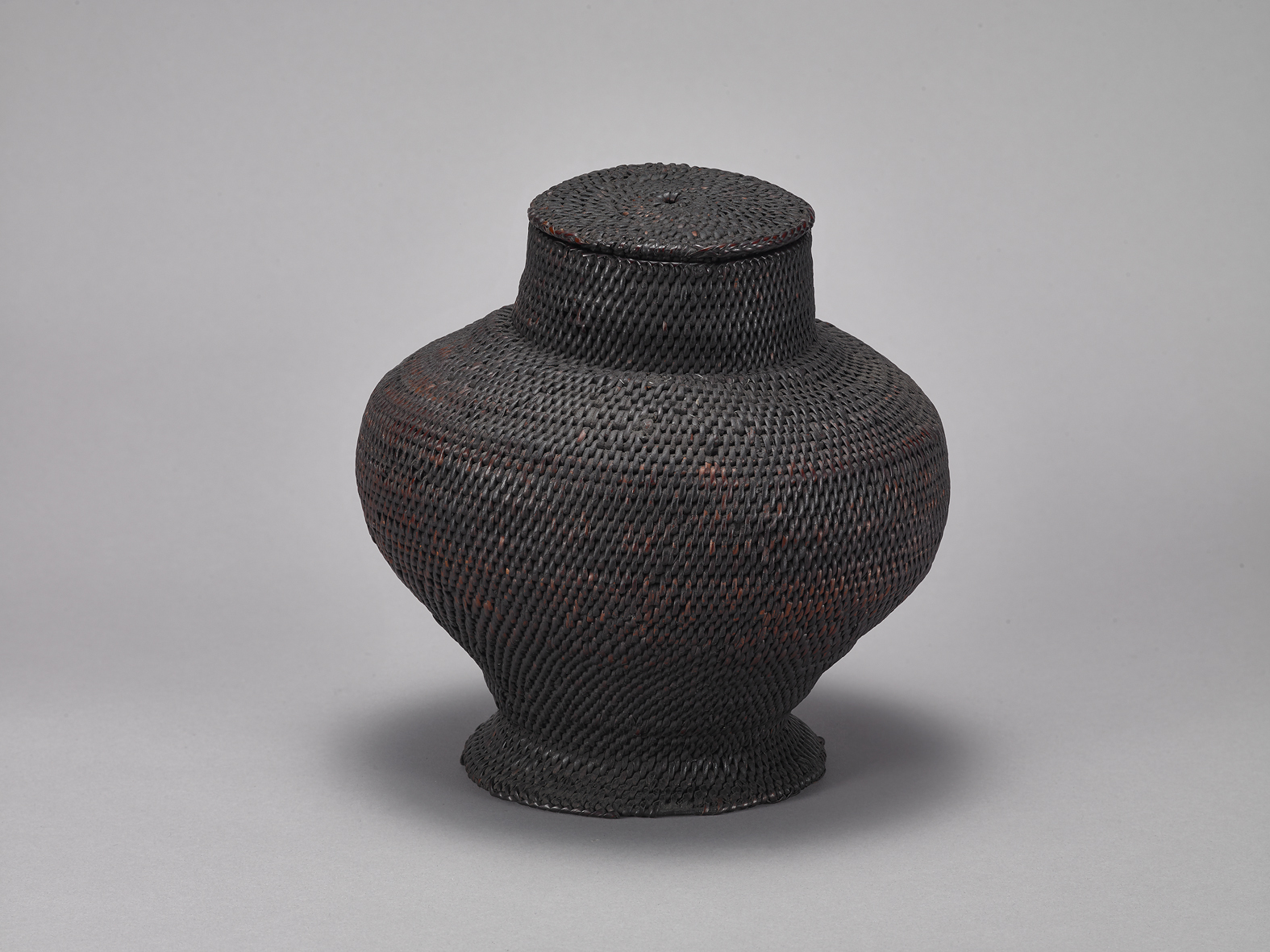
Rattan container (Unknown)

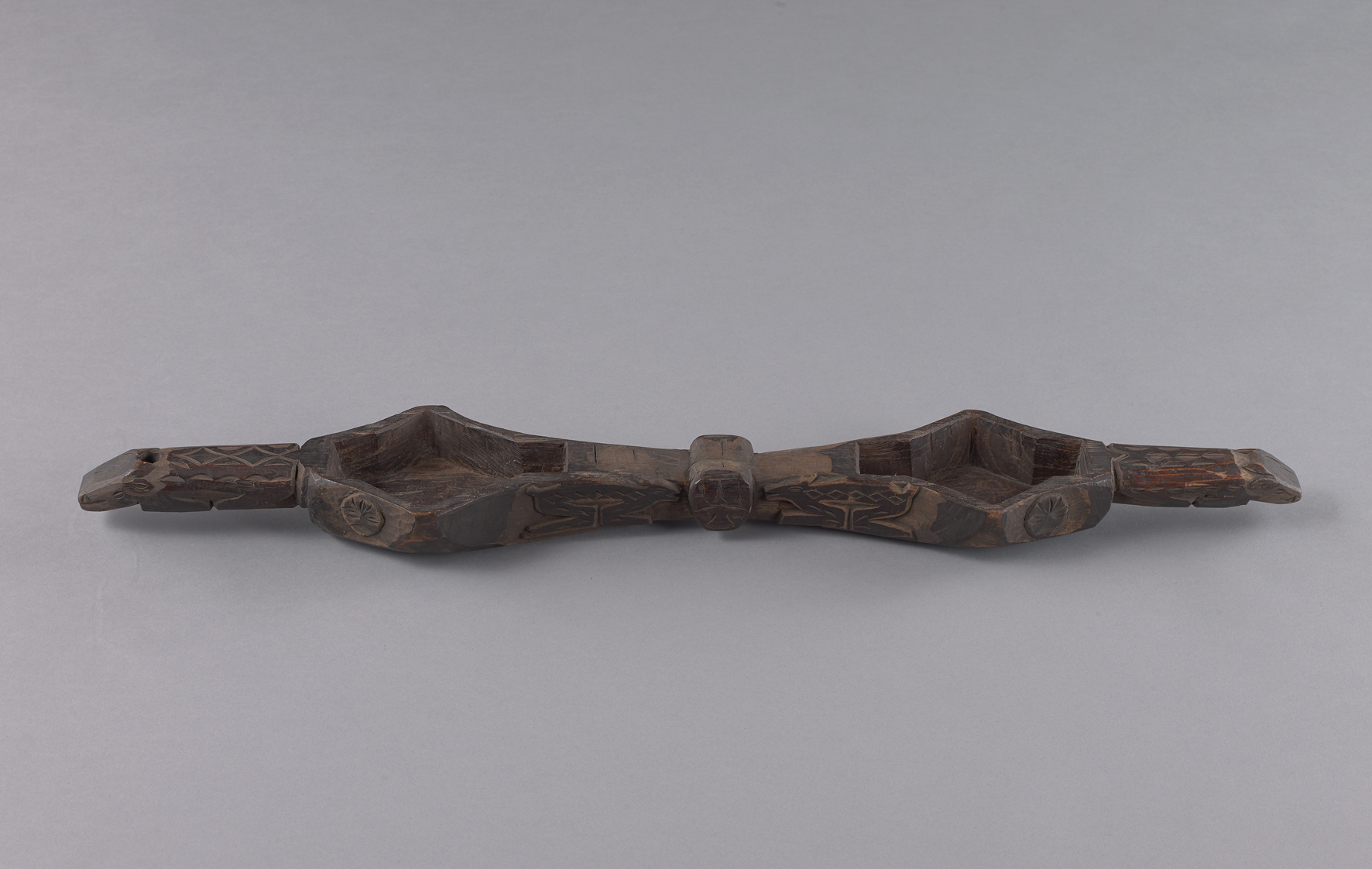
Double cup (Paiwan)

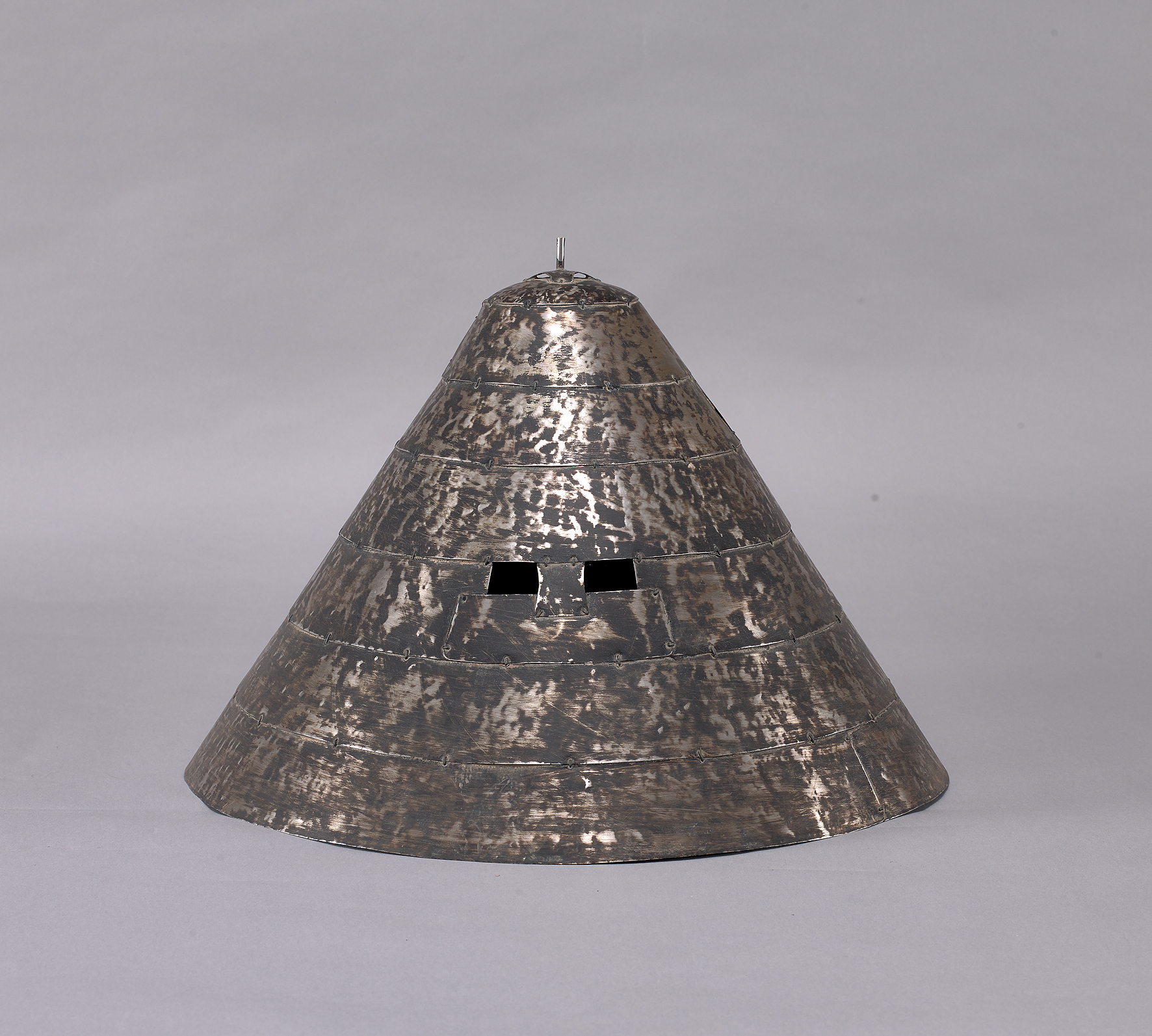
Silver helmet (Tao)

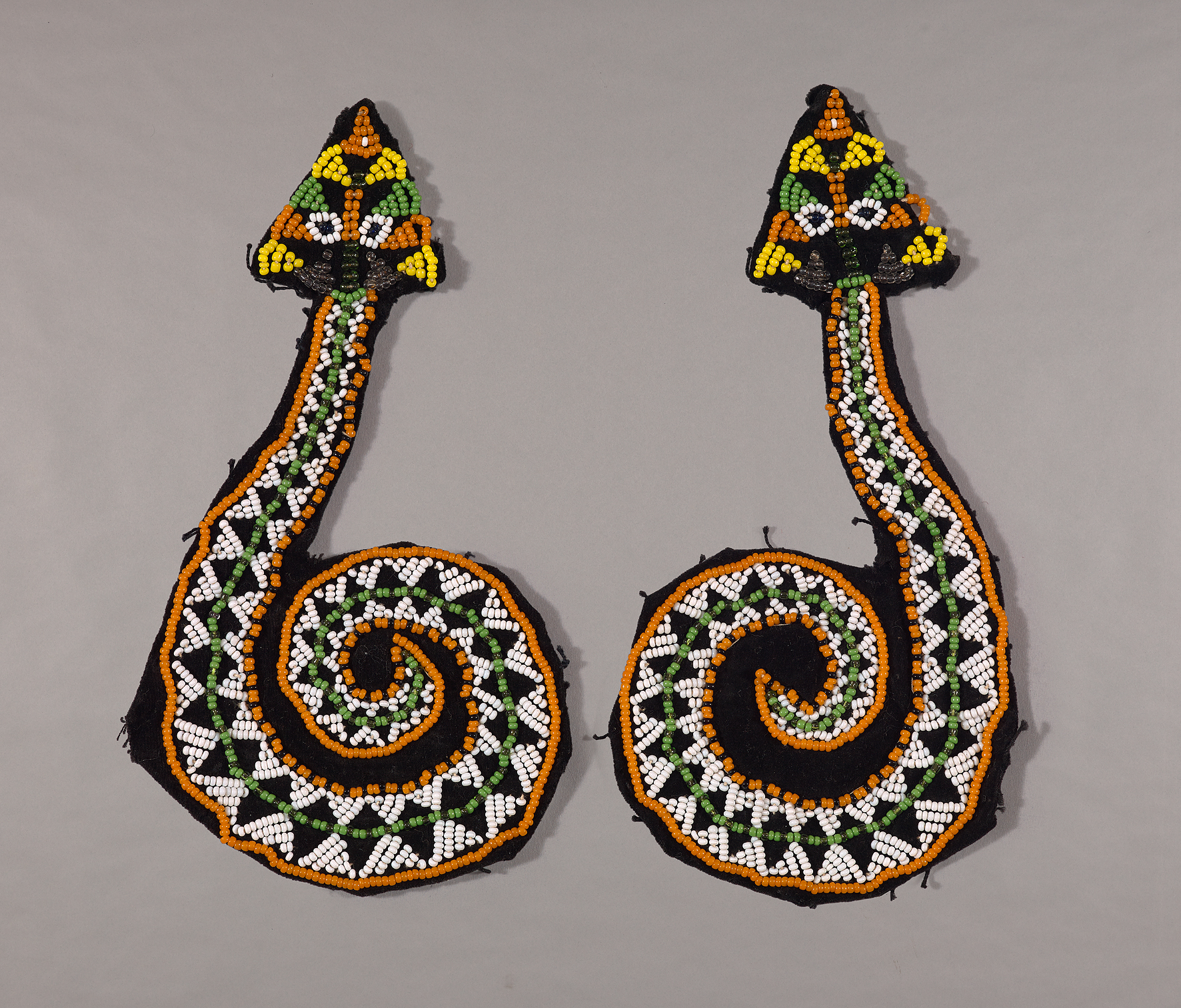
Coiled snake applique (Paiwan)

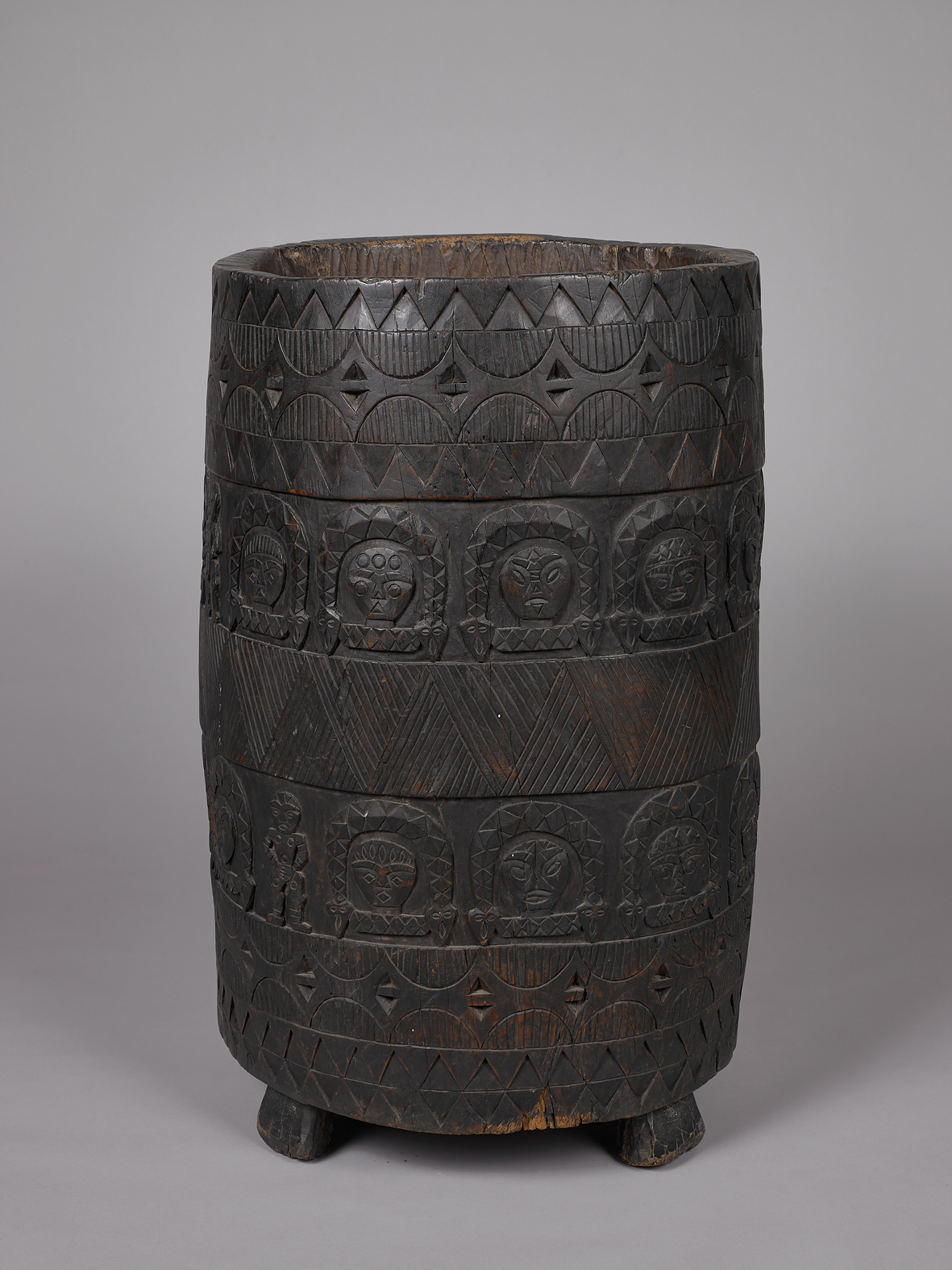
Grain barrel (Paiwan)

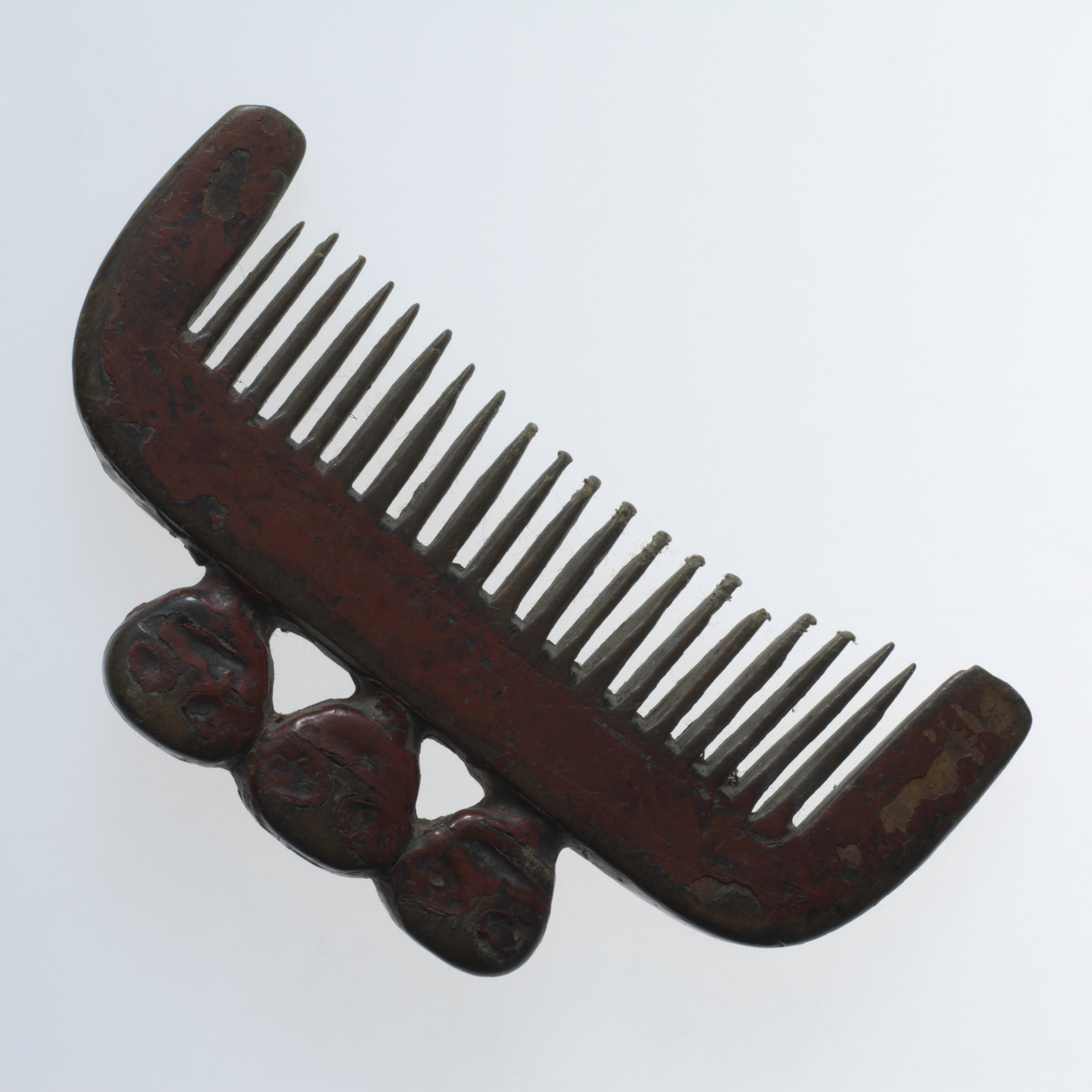
Comb (Paiwan)

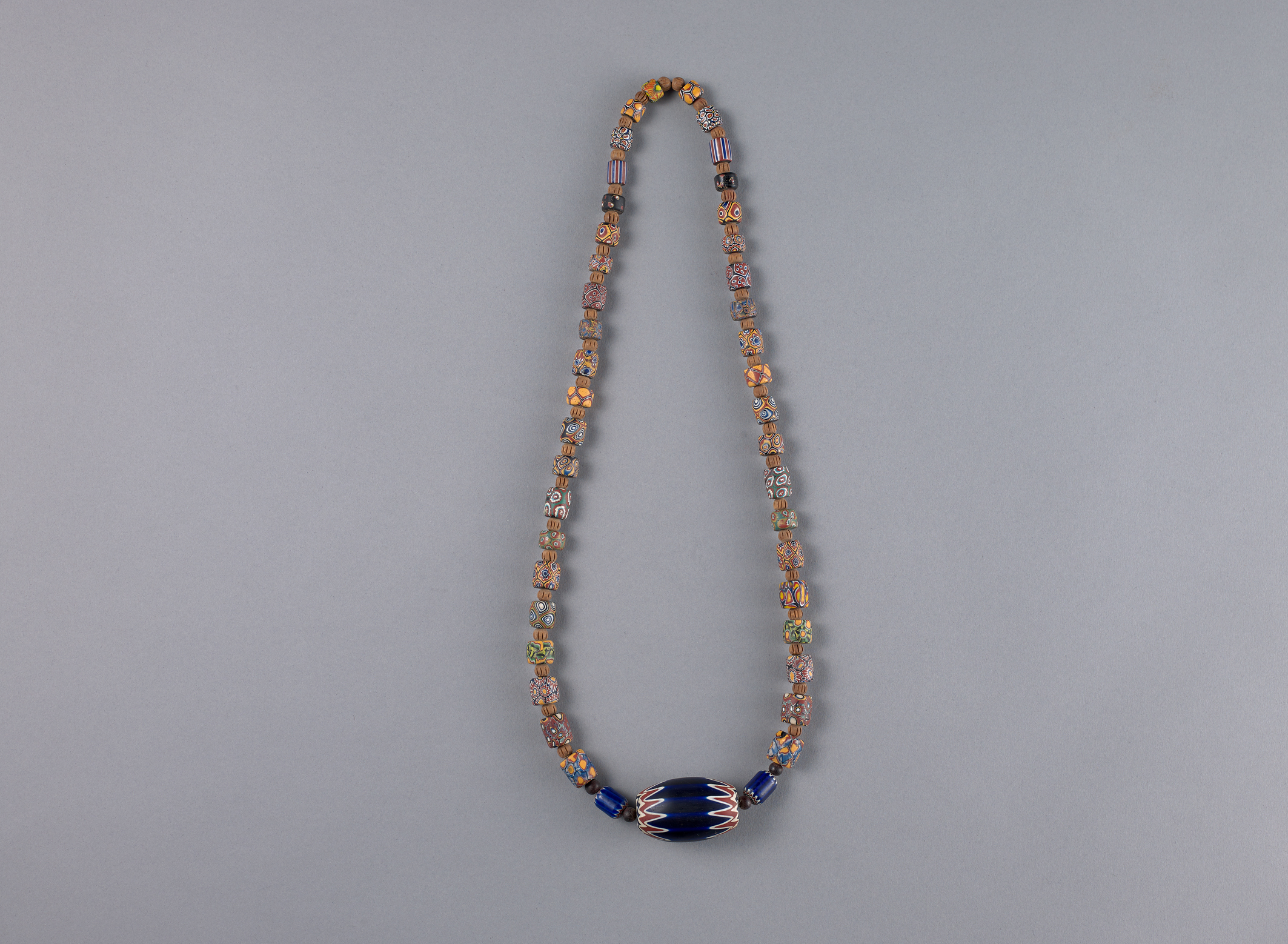
Chest ornament (Paiwan)

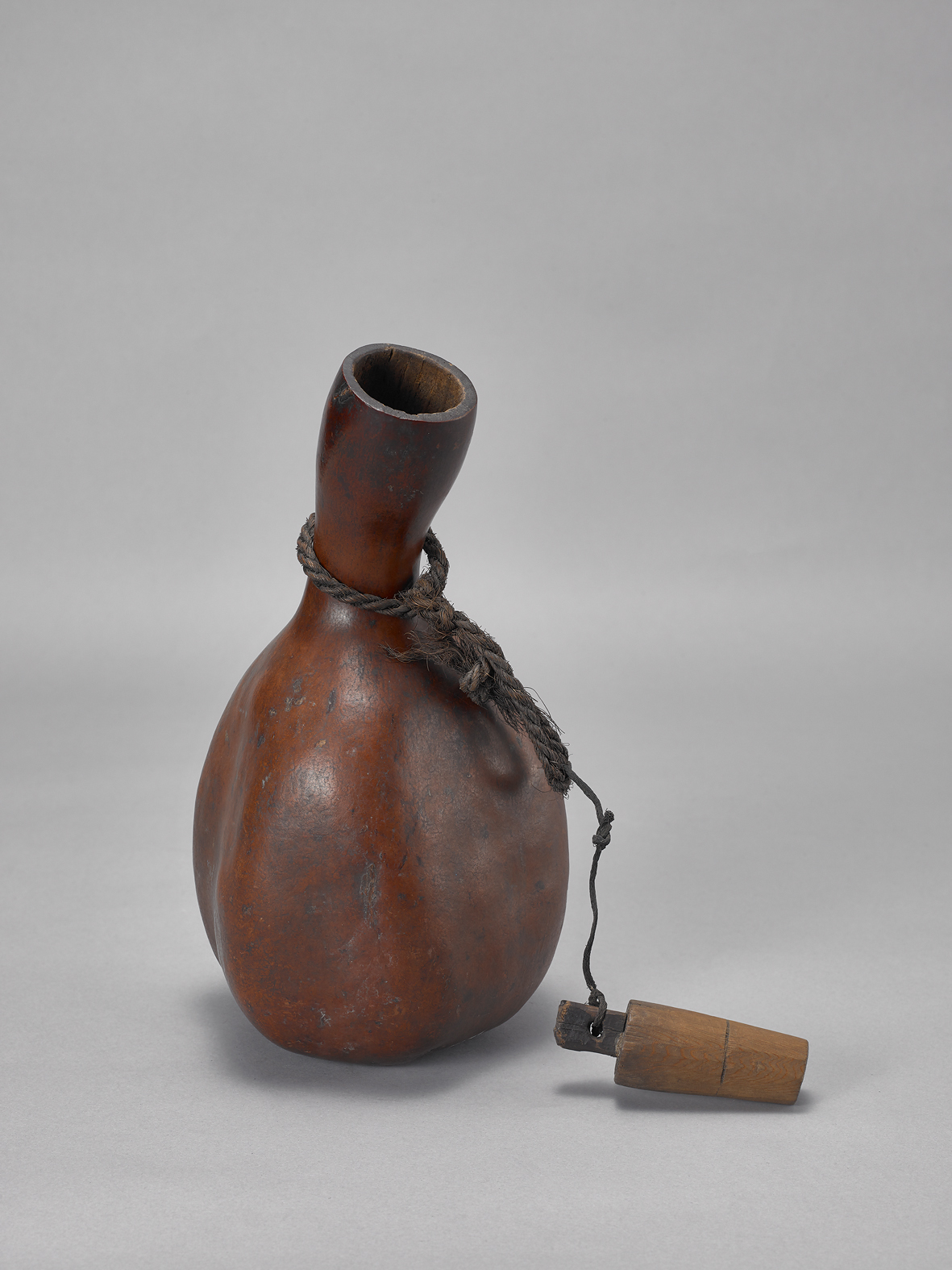
Bottle gourd (Bunun)

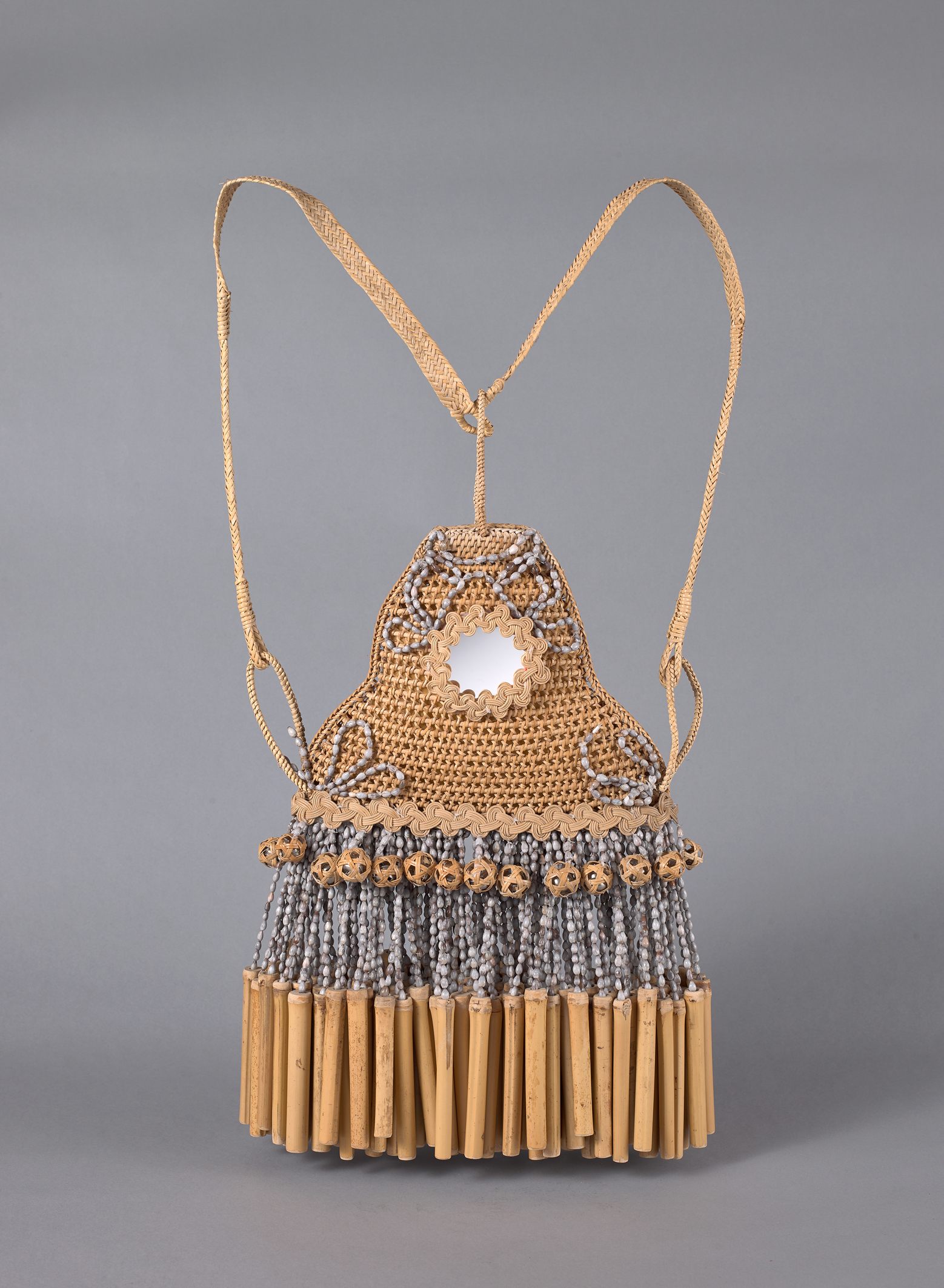
Dancing bells (Saisiyat)

== Other visitor facilities ==
=== Shung Ye Museum of Formosan Fine Arts ===
The Shung Ye Museum of Formosan Aborigines also maintains the Shung Ye Museum of Formosan Fine Arts, located in Zhongzheng District, Taipei, Taiwan. Its main purpose is to preserve Formosan artworks and to provide a base for young artists interested in Formosan art. Continuing the legacy from generation to generation, the museum was opened in 2020 under the planning of Chairman Lin Chunji (林純姬), daughter of Lin Qing-Fu (林清富).

== See also ==
- Austronesian peoples
- List of museums in Taiwan
- List of museums in Taipei
