= Hwa Kang Museum =

Museum in Shilin, Taipei, Taiwan

- 華岡博物館
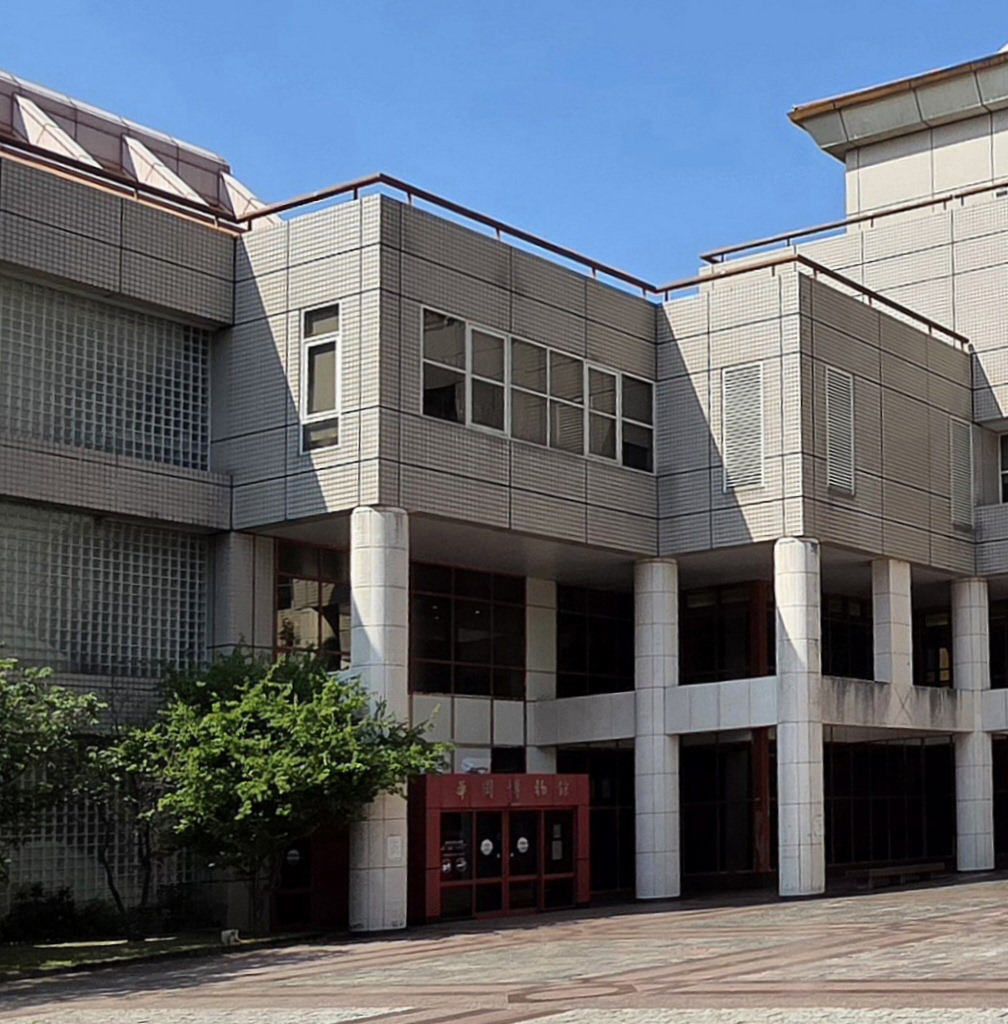
- Established: 1971
- Location: Shilin, Taipei, Taiwan
- Coordinates: 25°08′14″N 121°32′26″E
- Type: Museum
- Website: hkm.pccu.edu.tw/en

Chinese name
- Simplified Chinese: 华冈博物馆
- Traditional Chinese: 華岡博物館
Transcriptions
Standard Mandarin
- Hanyu Pinyin: Huágāng Bówùguǎn

The Hwa Kang Museum (Chinese: 華岡博物館; pinyin: Huágāng Bówùguǎn) is a museum in Shilin District of Taipei, Taiwan. The museum is located at the Chinese Culture University.

== History ==
In 1963, the museum was founded by founder Professor Chang Chi-yun as the Chinese Arts Artifacts Showroom and located at Da Cheng building. In 1965, it was renamed Cultural Museum and relocated to Da Yi building. In 1968, it was renamed again to International Chinese Studies and Information Exhibition Hall and move and integrated to the university library building. In 1971, the museum was officially established and became the largest university museum in Taiwan. In 1985, the founder's son Chang Jen-hu founded the Xiao Feng Memorial Hall dedicated to his father. In 1998, the construction of the building that houses the university library, data information center and Hwa Kang Museum was completed. On 1 March 1999 during the university founding anniversary, the museum was officially inaugurated.

== Architecture ==
The museum spans over a total floor area of 1,200 m^{2} (13,000 sq ft) in 3 stories and the Ao-Hou Nien Arts Center.

== Exhibition ==
Its permanent exhibition consists of 50,000 works, centuries of Chinese ceramics, modern Western and Chinese paintings, modern Chinese calligraphic works, Chinese folk arts, photos and woodblock prints.

== Activities ==
The museum regularly holds regular invitational, group and solo exhibitions, as well as educational and promotional activities such as lectures, tours and conferences on special subjects and theme classes and activities that help promote the advancement of cultural and artistic life in the community.

== See also ==
- List of museums in Taiwan
- Chinese Culture University
