= Tianmu White House =

Former house in Shilin, Taipei, Taiwan

- 天母白屋
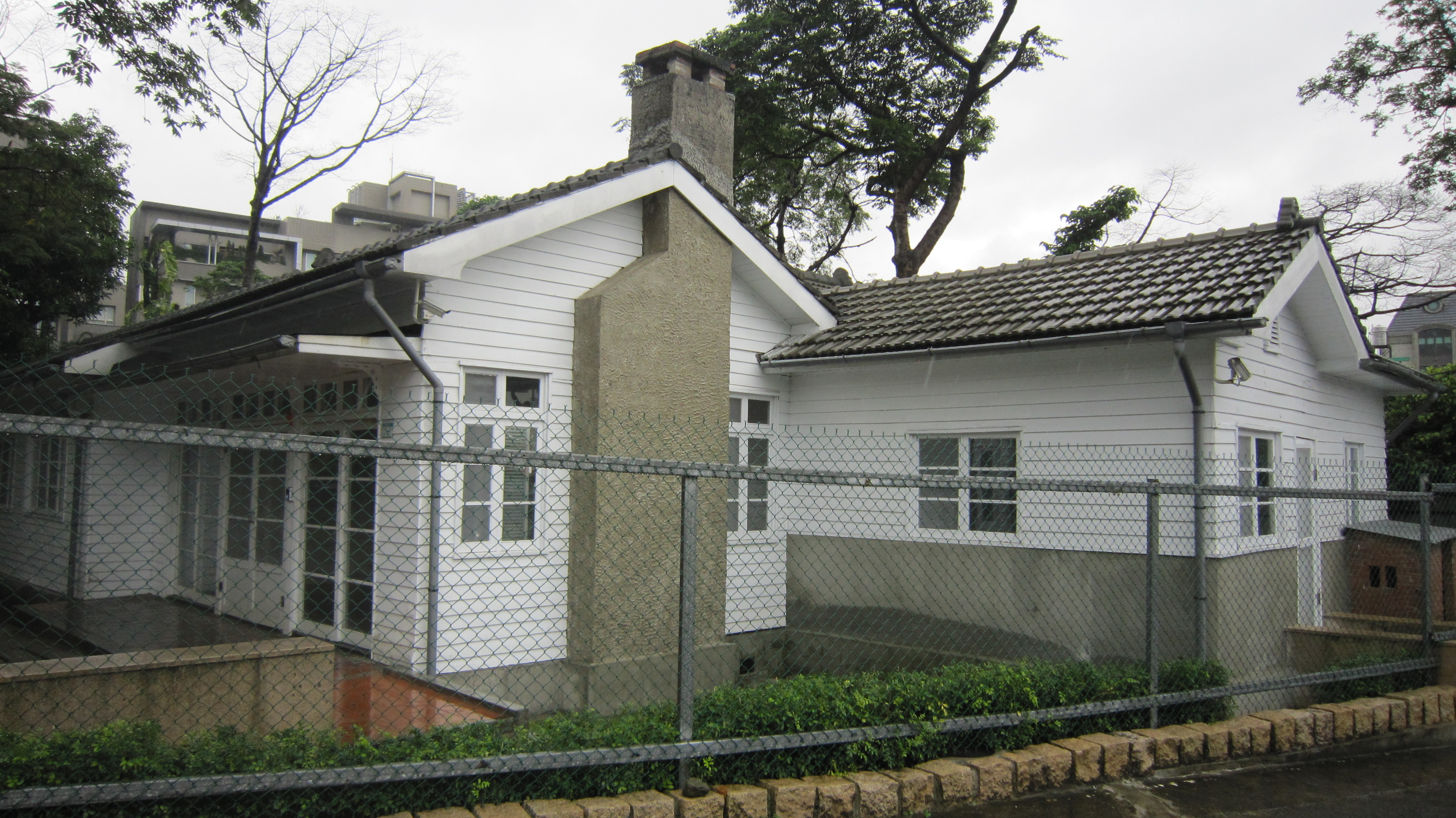
- Interactive map of the Tianmu White House area

General information
- Type: former house
- Location: Shilin, Taipei, Taiwan
- Coordinates: 25°07′29.1″N 121°31′50.6″E
- Opened: 20 July 2016

Technical details
- Floor area: 132 m^{2}

The Tianmu White House (Chinese: 天母白屋; pinyin: Tiānmǔ Báiwū) is a historical house in Shilin District, Taipei, Taiwan.

== History ==
In the 1950s, the Government of the Republic of China acquire the agricultural lands around the area and developed it into a residential area to house the United States (US) Armed Forces during the Korean War to defend Taiwan from attack from Mainland China. After the US armed forces left the island, the area began to degrade. In 2004, local residents requested the buildings to be preserved and later it was designated as historical site in 2005. In 2014, the house ownership was transferred from Bank of Taiwan to Taipei City Urban Regeneration Office. The house was opened to the public on 20 July 2016.

== Architecture ==
The house was designed with American suburban housing architecture style in the 1950s. It integrates Western, Chinese and Japanese style. Initially built with red brick colored, the house was painted white in 2006 for The Magicians of Love movie shooting.

== See also ==
- List of tourist attractions in Taiwan
