= Shilin metro station =

Metro station in Taipei, Taiwan

Shilin /Y29 士林
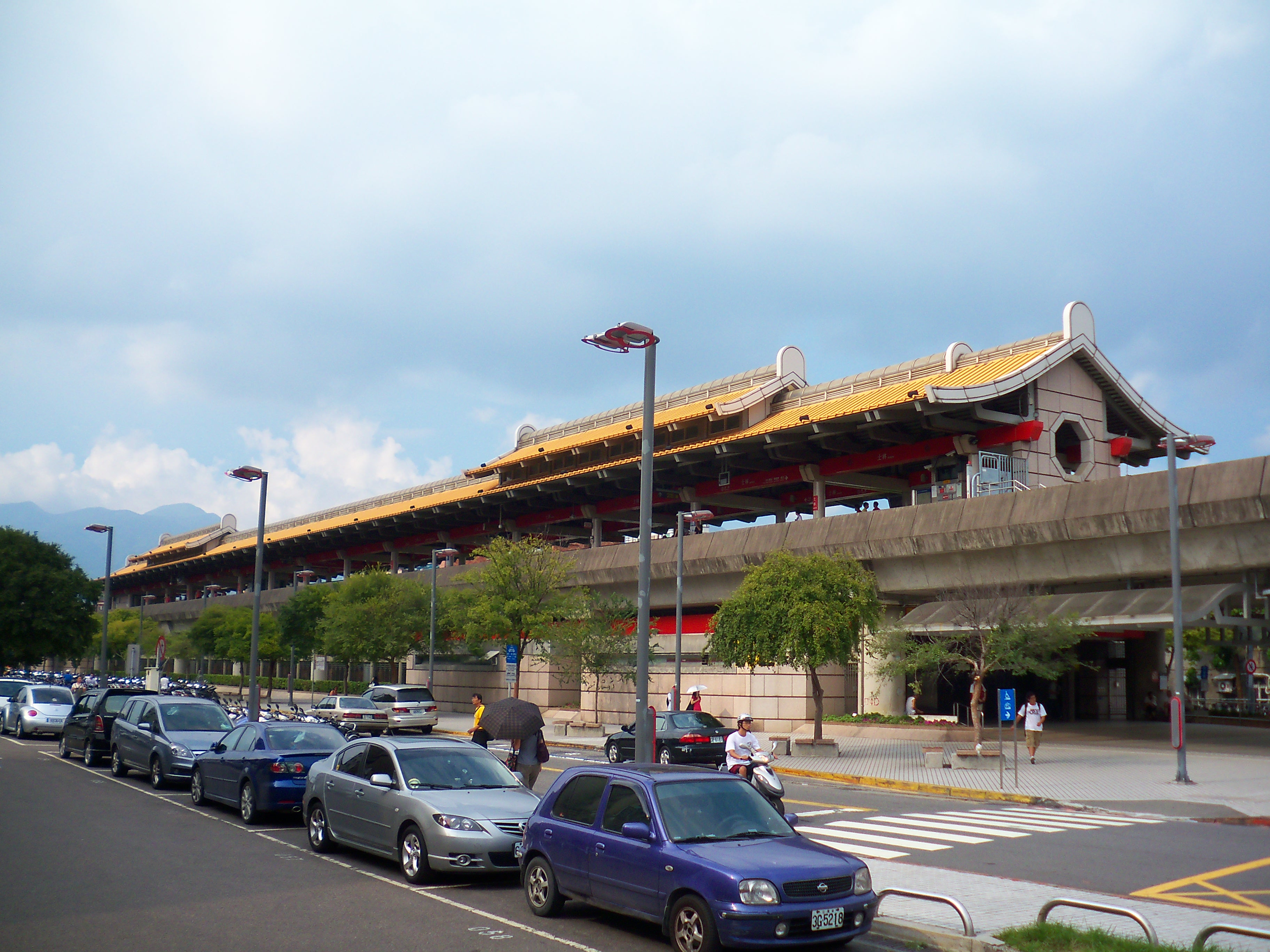
- Exterior

Chinese name
- Chinese: 士林
Transcriptions
Standard Mandarin
- Hanyu Pinyin: Shìlín
- Bopomofo: ㄕˋ ㄌㄧㄣˊ
- Wade–Giles: Shih⁴-lin²
Hakka
- Pha̍k-fa-sṳ: Sṳ-lìm
Southern Min
- Tâi-lô: Sū-lîm

General information
- Location: 1 Fude Rd; Shilin District, Taipei; Taiwan
- Coordinates: 25.0934°N 121.5262°E
- System: Taipei metro station

Construction
- Structure type: Elevated
- Cycle facilities: Access available

Other information
- Station code: /Y29
- Website: web.metro.taipei/e/stationdetail2010.asp?ID=R16-058

History
- Opened: 1997-03-28

Passengers
- 2017: 20.606 million per year ▼1.64%
- Rank: (Ranked 15 of 119)

Services
Preceding station	Taipei Metro	Following station
Jiantan towards Xiangshan or Daan	Tamsui–Xinyi Line	Zhishan towards Tamsui or Beitou
Future services
Preceding station	New Taipei Metro	Following station
Fudeyang towards Taipei Zoo	Circular Line	Linzikou towards Jiannan Road
Location

Shilin (Chinese: 士林; pinyin: Shìlín, formerly transliterated as Shihlin Station until 2003) is a metro station in Taipei, Taiwan served by Taipei Metro. It is a station on the Tamsui-Xinyi line. The station was formerly a stop on the now-defunct TRA Tamsui line.

== Station overview ==
The station is situated between the metro-shaped park and Zhongzheng Road, near Zhongshan North Road and Wenlin Road. This is a two-level, elevated station structure with one island platform and two exits, going to Zhongzheng Road and Fude Road. The restrooms are inside the entrance area of both exits.

In the future, the station will allow transfers to the planned Circular line via an underground platform.

== History ==
The station was originally opened on 25 October 1901 as Shirin Station for the Tamsui Railroad Line. It was closed on 15 July 1988, for the construction of Taipei Metro, which was completed on 28 March 1997.

== Station layout ==
2F	Platform 1	← Tamsui–Xinyi line toward Tamsui / Beitou (R17 Zhishan)
2F	Island platform, doors will open on the left
2F	Platform 2	→ Tamsui–Xinyi line toward Xiangshan / Daan (R15 Jiantan) →
1F	Tamsui-Xinyi line concourse	Exit to Shilin Night Market
B1	Circular line concourse (under construction)	Lobby, information desk, automatic ticketing dispensing machines, faregates Restrooms
B2	Platform 1	← Circular line toward Jiannan Road (Y30 Linzikou)
B2	Island platform, doors will open on the left (under construction)
B2	Platform 2	→ Circular line toward Taipei Zoo (Y28 Fudeyang) →

== First and last train timings ==
The first and last train timings at Shilin station are as follows:

Destination	First train		Last train
Destination	Mon − Fri	Sat − Sun and P.H.	Daily
Tamsui–Xinyi Line
R28 Tamsui	06:02	06:02	00:47
R01guangci/fengtian palace station	06:05	06:05	00:44

== Gallery ==
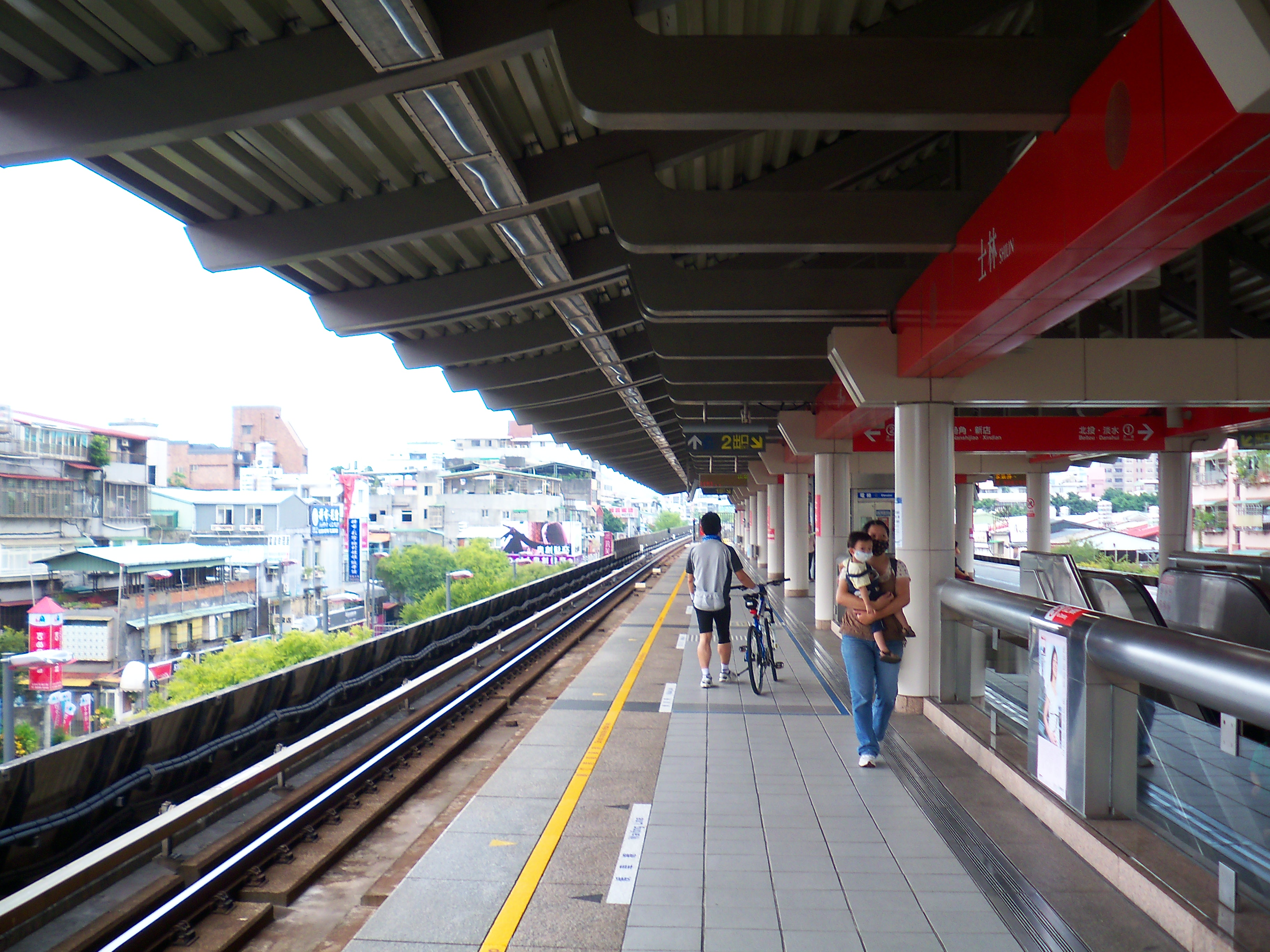
Shilin station platform

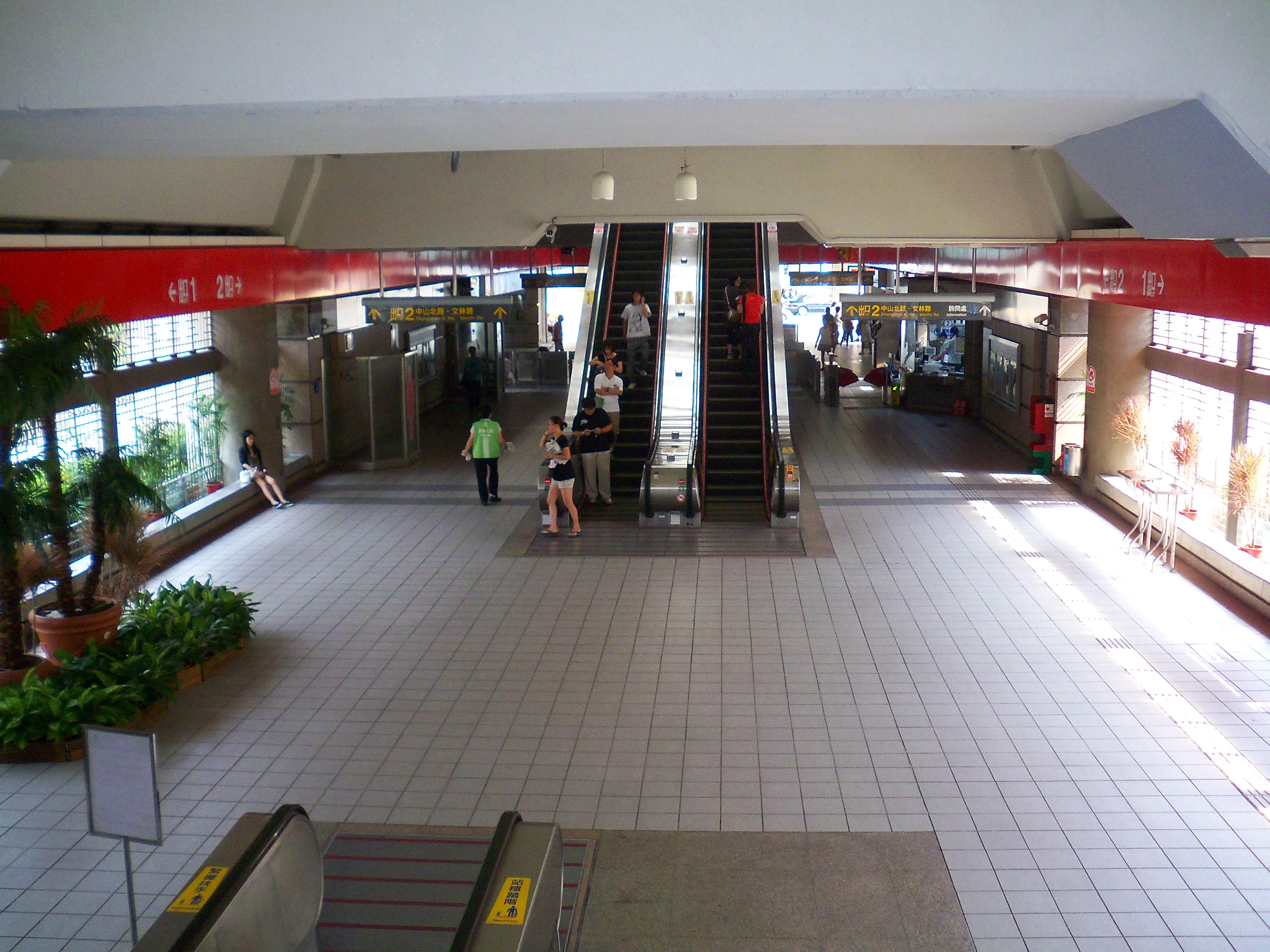
Shilin station concourse and escalators
