= Tamsui–Xindian–Zhonghe Line =

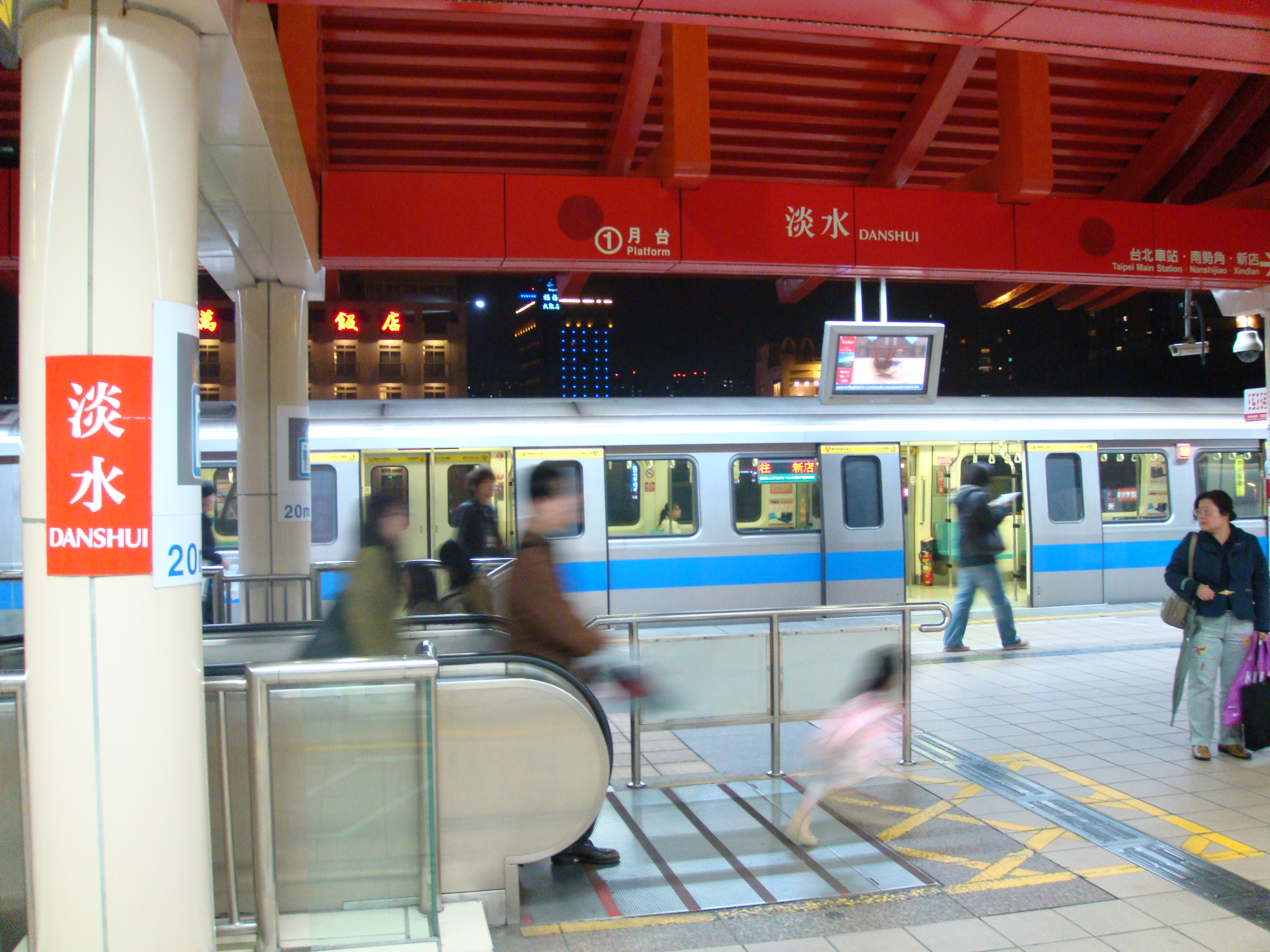
- The former Tamsui–Xindian line train at Tamsui station

Overview
- Native name: 淡新中線
- Status: Discontinued
- Owner: Taipei DORTS
- Locale: Taipei and New Taipei, Taiwan
- Termini: Tamsui/Beitou; Xindian/Nanshijiao
- Stations: 34
- Website: www.metro.taipei

Service
- Type: Rapid transit (high capacity)
- System: Taipei Metro
- Services: Tamsui–Xindian; Beitou–Nanshijiao
- Operator: Taipei Rapid Transit Corporation
- Depot(s): Zhonghe, Xindian, Beitou
- Rolling stock: C301; C371; C381

History
- Opened: December 24, 1998
- September 17, 2001: Typhoon Nari
- Closed: November 15, 2014

Technical
- Line length: 38.5 km (23.9 mi)
- Num of tracks: 2
- Character: Elevated; at-ground; underground
- Track gauge: 1,435 mm (4 ft 8 1/2 in)
- Electrification: 750V, third rail
- Operating speed: 80 km/h (50 mph)

The Tamsui–Xindian–Zhonghe Line (Chinese: 淡新中線) was the existed through service of Taipei Metro, composed of the Tamsui, Xindian, and Zhonghe Lines. This service was 38.5 kilometres (23.9 mi) long with 34 stations, operated by Taipei Rapid Transit Corporation. It started in December 1998, when the Zhonghe and Xindian lines were opened and made their through services with the Tamsui line, and was discontinued on November 15, 2014, when the Songshan Line was opened.

== Stations ==
Tamsui-Xindian route

- Tamsui station
- Hongshulin station
- Zhuwei station
- Guandu station
- Fuxinggang station
- Beitou station
- Qiyan station
- Qilian station
- Shipai station
- Mingde station
- Zhishan station
- Shilin station
- Jiantan station
- Yuanshan station
- Minquan West Road station
- Shuanglian station
- Zhongshan station
- Taipei Main Station
- NTU Hospital station
- Chiang Kai-shek Memorial Hall station
- Guting station
- Taipower Building station
- Gongguan station
- Wanlong station
- Jingmei station
- Dapinglin station
- Qizhang station
- Xindian District Office station
- Xindian station

Beitou-Nanshijiao route

(for Beitou to Guting stations, see the Tamsui-Xindian route.)

Separates from the Tamsui-Xindian route at Guting station.

- Guting station
- Dingxi station
- Yongan Market station
- Jingan station
- Nanshijiao station

== See also ==
- Through service
- Hong Kong MTR Modified Initial System
- Singapore MRT North–South Line and East–West Line
- Tamsui–Xinyi Line
- Songshan–Xindian Line
- Zhonghe–Xinlu Line
