= Beitou (disambiguation) =

Beitou is a district of Taipei City, Taiwan.

Beitou may also refer to:

- Beitou Cable Car, a cable car line in Beitou District, Taipei, Taiwan
- Beitou metro station, a metro station of the Taipei Metro
- Beitou Museum, a museum in Beitou District, Taipei, Taiwan
- Beitou Park, a park in Beitou District, Taipei, Taiwan
- Beitou Presbyterian Church, a presbyterian church in Beitou District, Taipei, Taiwan

== See also ==
- Beidou (disambiguation)
- Xinbeitou (disambiguation)
