= Through service =

Concept of passenger transport

A through service is a concept of passenger transport that involves a vehicle travelling between lines, networks or operators on a regularly specified schedule, on which the passenger can remain on board without alighting. It may be in either of the following forms:

- A service where the vehicle travels between different lines, or systems of infrastructure – for example, a through train service between the mainline and underground railways.
- A service where the vehicle changes its identity en-route without requiring passengers to alight – for example, a through tram service which runs as route 1 initially, then runs as route 2 for the latter half of the journey.

The term through service may be extended to have a wider meaning encompassing a route which allows the passenger to travel without alighting, for example, in a route change announcement, if a route A-B and a route B-C is combined to A-B-C, it may be described as a new "through service" between A and C. This is in contrast with direct service, where a through service may be a circuitous route but allows the passenger on board for the whole circuitous journey. This is to be distinguished with operating arrangement which a vehicle changes its service route between revenue journeys at a terminus, but requires passengers to alight or retender fare.

== Rail transport ==
A train on a through service may also be called a through train (also referred to as through service, run-through service/train or interline).

In operational terms, a through train is a train operated on different railway lines, possibly between different operators as well. This is usually accomplished through compatible infrastructure—identical track gauge and durability issues (although variable gauge trains do exist, they tend to be expensive), rolling stock dimensions, curve speed and signaling compatibility, train station dimensions (to avoid damage to rolling stock), tunnels and bridge dimensions and maximum weight, and power requirements. The exact terminology (and definition) vary as usage; in the case of National Rail of the UK, a through train is one which may be used by a passenger to make their entire journey without changing trains.

However, the fact that a train travels on different lines, or even tracks of different operators, may not be obvious if it is operated within the same network from a passenger's perspective. This is particularly common in cross-city routes. For example, trains in China commonly travel between lines to service different destinations, but when it involves a change of train number as a result of changing from an up-line to another down-line, or vice versa (see below), it is obvious to the passenger.

=== Australia ===
- Melbourne: Metro Trains Melbourne's Cranbourne and Pakenham lines run through to the Sunbury line via the Metro Tunnel; Werribee and Williamstown lines run through to the Sandringham line via Flinders Street Station from 23 August 2026.
- Perth: Transperth's Yanchep line runs through to the Mandurah line; Midland line runs through to the Fremantle line.
- Brisbane: Northside rail lines through run with Southside Rail lines via Roma Street Station.

=== Canada ===
- Toronto, Ontario: GO Transit's Lakeshore East line and Lakeshore West line are commonely interlined with each other through the Union Station Rail Corridor.
- Amtrak and Via Rail's Maple Leaf service between Toronto and New York City is operated by Via Rail between Toronto and Niagara Falls, and by Amtrak between Niagara Falls and New York, operating as a single through service. Passengers typically need to disembark at the border for immigration and customs, however.

=== Mainland China ===
In mainland China, as train numbers are decided on the direction (up/down) of track, with up (to Beijing) trains having even train numbers and down (from Beijing) trains having odd train numbers. If a services travel on tracks in different directions, the train number changes at the station where the train changes direction, creating a through service.

For example, the train service from Guangzhou to Lhasa operates between Guangzhou to Zhengzhou as Z264 on the up line, and changes to Z265 from Zhengzhou to Lhasa on the down line, and passengers can stay on board for the whole journey. If a ticket is bought across both section, both train numbers will be shown on the ticket.

Chinese cities operate several through services:

- Passenger: Some trains from China's Guangzhou-Shenzhen Railway cross the border and run onto the Hong Kong MTR East Rail to Hung Hom, but these trains do not stop along its stations, because border clearance is only done in Hung Hom. MTR also operate trains from Hung Hom onwards across the border on the Guangzhou-Shenzhen Railway.
- Freight-only: Chongqing–Duisburg, Germany; once a month.

Several metro systems have through operation (simplified Chinese: 贯通运营; traditional Chinese: 貫通運營; pinyin: guàntōng yùnyíng) between lines.

- Beijing Subway: Line 1 and Batong line: through service started August 29, 2021; Line 4 and Daxing line: most trains from Line 4 operates through service into the Daxing Line and all Daxing Line trains continue into Line 4; Line 9 and Fangshan line: through service (peak hours only) started January 18, 2023.
- Kunming Metro: Line 1 and Line 2 operate through service at South Ring Road station, until later phases of both lines open, henceforth splitting apart.
- Nanjing Metro: some Line S1 trains through operate into Line S7.
- Zhengzhou Metro: some trains from Line 2 operates through service into Chengjiao Line and vice versa.
- Guangzhou Metro: some trains of Line 3's Main Branch and Northern (Airport) Branch through operates. Normally, the Main branch operates trains from Haibang to Tianhe Coach Terminal stations, and the Northern (Airport) branch operates trains from Tiyu Xilu to Airport North stations. However, some trains will through operate, running between from Haibang to Airport North. When Line 10 is opened, sections between Shipaiqiao and Tianhe Coach Terminal will be transferred to Line 10, making all services on Line 3 operating between Haibang to Airport North only.
- Chongqing Rail Transit: Express trains (Chinese: 直快列车) of Line 4 and Loop Line started the through operation in September 2020. At first, the service route was from Tangjiatuo to Chongqing Library. In December 2021, the route of the Express train extended from Chongqing Library to Tiaodeng on Line 5.
- Dalian Metro: Line 3 branch and Line 13 currently operate through service.
- Suzhou Metro: through service between Line 3 and Line 11 began in late 2023 and Line 4 and Line 7 (peak hours only) from Longdaobang to Muli stations via Hongzhuang from August 28, 2025.
- Shenzhen Metro: Line 2 branch and Line 8 operate through services at Liantang station. Additionally, Line 8 trains are expected to through-run as Line 32 at Xichong station once the line opens in 2028.

=== Hong Kong ===
- Hong Kong MTR Light Rail: Vehicles of Route 614P and 615P continue to run onto each other's route after they arrive at the termini in Siu Hong and Tuen Mun Ferry Pier, effectively running on a loop line in both clockwise and counterclockwise directions.
- Hong Kong MTR: Trains on MTR's Kwun Tong line may continue to run onto the southern half of Tsuen Wan line to Central if services on the northern half of the latter are disrupted. Likewise trains on Kwun Tong line may continue onto Tseung Kwan O line to Po Lam or North Point when service on the latter line is disrupted.

=== France ===
Paris Réseau express régional:

- RER A trains serving the Cergy and Poissy branches run on SNCF (western part) and RATP (eastern part) tracks.
- RER B runs on SNCF (northern part) and RATP (southern part) tracks.

In both cases, trains run contiguously, thus providing a one-seat ride across both SNCF and RATP networks. To achieve smooth network crossing, RATP and SNCF jointly designed and ordered specific MI 79 rolling stock (where MI stands for matériel d'interconnexion, French for "cross-network rolling stock.") Change of drivers was compulsory at network boundaries until 2008 when one-driver cross-network runs were introduced.

=== Germany ===
In Germany, such services are called Durchbindung.

=== Japan ===
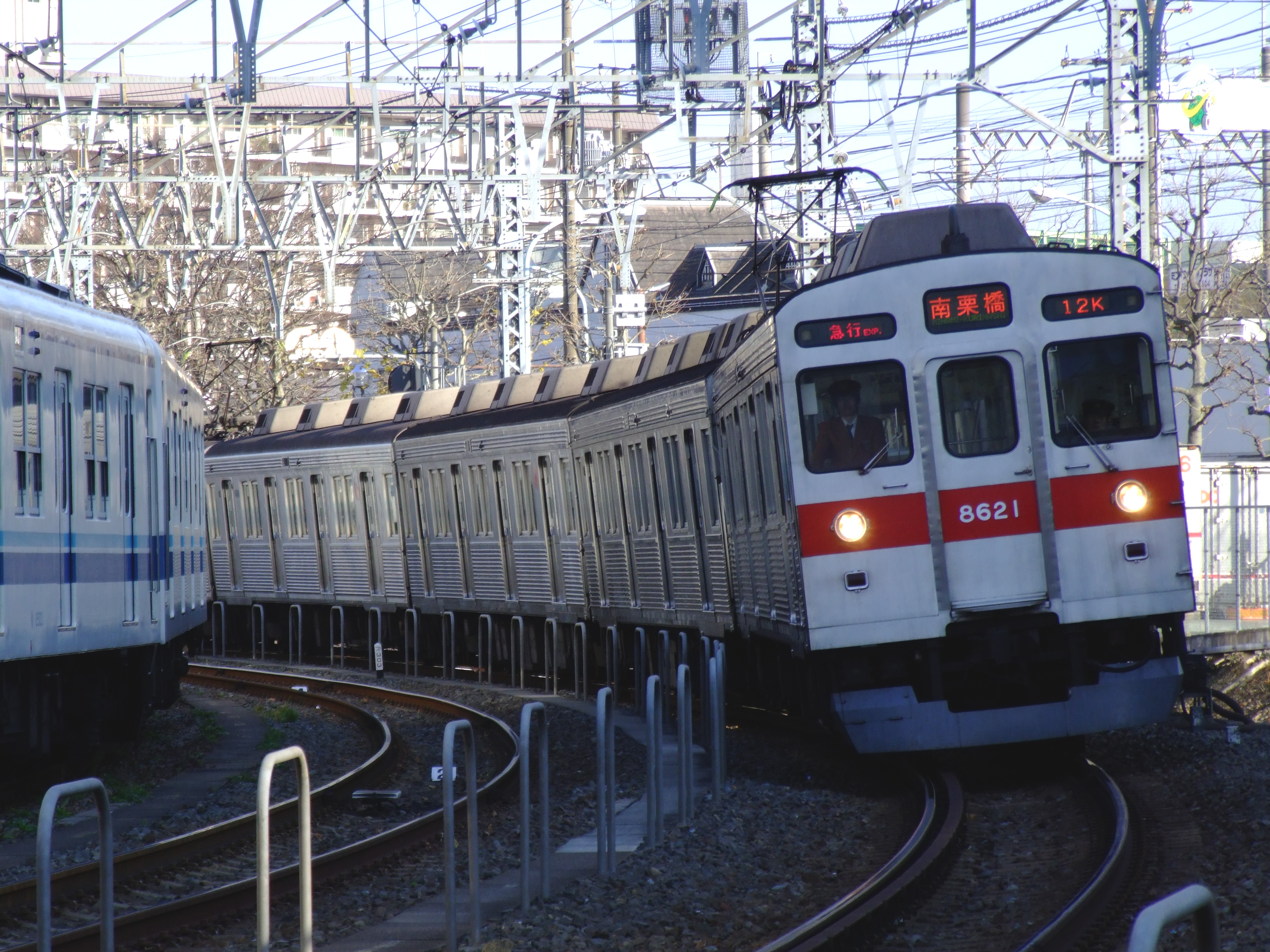
A Tokyu Corporation 8500 series train on the Tobu Isesaki Line. Through service between different suburban rail lines are common in greater Tokyo.

Through services (直通運転, chokutsū unten) are regularly scheduled train services owned by an operator which runs on tracks which it does not own. Many urban railways in Japan operate such services to increase ridership, increase convenience and simplicity, and reduce time to destinations by eliminating transfers through seamless connection. One example is a Narita-to-Haneda Airport Express service, which runs on four companies' tracks-Keikyu, Toei, Keisei, and Hokuso Railway. Despite fewer new lines in recent years as the system is mature, more through services are proliferating to reduce cross metropolitan area connection time, at least in theory.

A 2016 MLIT study has shown that minor train delays are quite commonplace in Greater Tokyo during rush hour, at odds with Japan's image of train punctuality. The reason for this is that the subway lines in particular are subject to heavier loads, and thus more delay as riders rush in at the last minute, and forcing final door closings to be delayed. The proliferation of through-services has only magnified the problem, as it acts as a double-edged sword, though convenient in not having to switch trains, central Tokyo delays increasingly cause a ripple effect to through services on suburban lines.

=== Taiwan ===
Before the Songshan Line extended in November 2014, the Taipei Metro operated the Tamsui–Xindian–Zhonghe line, a through service consisting of sections of track of what is now the Tamsui-Xinyi Line (Red line), the Songshan-Xindian Line (Green line), and the Zhonghe-Xinlu Line (Orange line). This service was 38.5 kilometres (23.9 mi) long with 34 stations and offered two services, the Tamsui-Xindian service and the Beitou-Nanshijiao service. On November 15th 2014, after operating for 16 years (since December 1998), the through-service was discontinued.

=== South Korea ===
Subway trains of Seoul Subway Line 1, Line 3 and Line 4 run through to Korail suburban lines. Suin Line and Bundang Line services were merged into the Suin-Bundang Line, while Gyeongui Line and Jungang Line services were also merged into the Gyeongui-Jungang Line.

=== Spain ===
Euskotren line E1 from San Sebastian to Bilbao changes on arrival to Bilbao to Bilbao Metro Line 3. On the other end of Metro Line 3 trains continue as Euskotren E3 to Lezama.

=== Russia ===
Russia operates regular scheduled through services with other countries:

- Moscow–Beijing (via Trans-Siberian Railway and Trans-Manchurian Railway)
- Moscow–Sofia via Kyiv
- Moscow–Astana
- Moscow–Ulaanbaatar (via Trans-Siberian Railway and Trans-Mongolian Railway)

=== United Kingdom ===
The mainline rail network in Great Britain, with a few exceptions, is owned and operated by Network Rail which organises its track into lines, such as South West Main Line and East Coast Main Line. A through service on the National Rail network running on the mainline rail is defined as a journey for which a change of train is not required. These trains commonly run through multiple lines of Network Rail for their journey.

In addition, there are also some through service across different infrastructure owners as well, which include:

- Bakerloo line of the London Underground runs on its own track between Elephant & Castle and Queen's Park, then run through onto Watford DC line owned by Network Rail to Harrow & Wealdstone.
- District line of the London Underground runs on its own track just before Gunnersbury then run through onto North London Line owned by Network Rail to Richmond.
- Chiltern Railways services between London Marylebone and Amersham run on Network Rail tracks on most of the journey, but use London Underground tracks between Amersham and Harrow-on-the-Hill.
- Elizabeth line services from Shenfield to Heathrow Airport run on the Network Rail owned Great Eastern Main Line, then onto the Crossrail owned by Rail for London Infrastructure, then onto Network Rail owned Great Western Main Line and finally the privately owned line to Heathrow Airport, switching between different signalling system on the move.
- The Sheffield Supertram tram-trains run through the tram network and mainline rail.

=== United States ===
In the United States, a through train is referred to as interline and is defined as "the interchange of passengers between one or more bus lines, rail transit lines, or railroads" or "the transfer of transit vehicles or trains between routes during a day to improve staff or vehicle assignment efficiency". Examples of interlining include:

- Portland, Oregon: MAX Light Rail's Yellow and Orange lines interline within the light rail tracks of the Portland Transit Mall
- Westchester–New York City: Trains operating on the Metro-North Railroad run through to New York City tracks and switch from electric to diesel
- Chicago: The Purple Line Express goes to The Loop through the track of the Brown Line during Rush hour.
- Maryland: In September 2026, MARC Train inaugurated a once-daily in each direction through train connecting the Brunswick and Camden Lines bypassing Washington Union Station, connecting Montgomery County and Baltimore by rail.

== Bus transport ==
There are some bus services which travel on a route, or a section of it, and change the route number while allowing passengers to stay on board. Such services can be describe as through services.

For example, morebus routes 16 and 17 may operate as a through service through Bournemouth Square, allowing the passenger to stay on board with a through fare.

== See also ==
- Trackage rights
- Express train
