= Qilian (disambiguation) =

Qilian may refer to:

Qilian (祁连)

- Qilian County, in Qinghai, China
- Qilian Mountains (Tsilien Mountains), in northwest China

Qili'an (唭哩岸)

- Qilian Station, in Beitou District, Taipei, Taiwan
