= Xinbeitou =

Xinbeitou may refer to:

- Xinbeitou branch line, a branch line of the Tamsui–Xinyi line.
- Xinbeitou metro station, a metro station of the Taipei Metro.
