= Lady Zhou's Memorial Gate =

Gate in Beitou, Taipei, Taiwan

- 周氏節孝坊
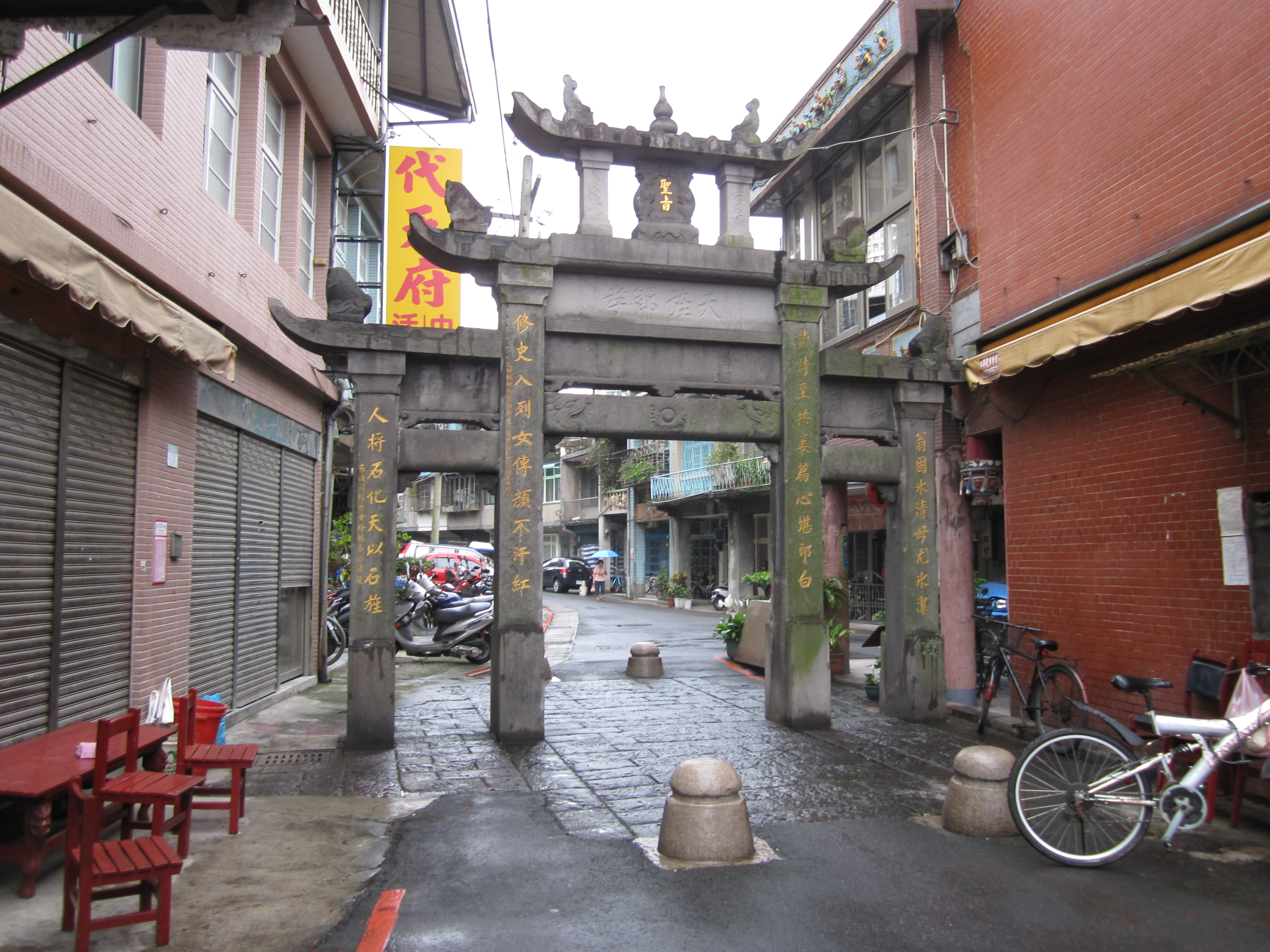
- Interactive map of the Lady Zhou's Memorial Gate area

General information
- Type: paifang
- Location: Beitou, Taipei, Taiwan
- Coordinates: 25°8′2.8″N 121°29′52″E
- Completed: 1861

The Lady Zhou's Memorial Gate (traditional Chinese: 周氏節孝坊; simplified Chinese: 周氏节孝坊; pinyin: Zhōushì Jié Xiàofang) is a paifang in Beitou District, Taipei, Taiwan.

== Name ==
The gate is named after Lady Zhou, a local lady who was born in 1788 and died in 1846. She was widowed a very young age and raised her children as a single mother. She was known to be very filial to her parents-in-law.

== History ==
The establishment of the gate was proposed in 1850 by Governor-General Liu of Zhejiang and Fujian to commemorate Lady Zhou's good deeds. The construction was then completed in 1861. The gate was partially damaged by an earthquake on 15 March 1897. The gate was eventually restored by the Department of Civil Affairs of Taipei City Government in 1992.

== Architecture ==
The gate is made from stones of Mount Guanyin in New Taipei.

== Transportation ==
The gate is accessible within walking distance north of Beitou Station of Taipei Metro.

== See also ==
- List of tourist attractions in Taiwan
