= Hong-Gah Museum =

Museum in Beitou, Taipei, Taiwan

- 鳳甲美術館
- Established: 25 October 1999; 26 years ago
- Location: Beitou, Taipei, Taiwan
- Coordinates: 25°07′31″N 121°29′57″E
- Type: museum
- Owner: Chiu Tsai-hsing
- Website: Official website

The Hong-Gah Museum (traditional Chinese: 鳳甲美術館; simplified Chinese: 凤甲美术馆; Pe̍h-ōe-jī: Hōng-kah Bí-su̍t-koán; pinyin: Fèngjiǎ Měishùguǎn) or Feng-jia Museum is a museum in Beitou District, Taipei, Taiwan.

The Hong-Gah Museum was formally opened to the public in 1999. With exhibitions, campaigns, inter-disciplinary performances, and so forth, the museum provides an art appreciation venue of quality as well as sows seeds of art for the local community. Having opened for more than 20 years, the museum received its membership as one of the Local Cultural Museums of the Ministry of Culture in 2003. The museum has been recognized many times with "Arts & Business Awards" and "Taipei Culture Award".

== History ==
The Hong-Gah Museum was opened on 25 October 1999 under Chew's Culture Foundation, which was founded in 1991. In its initial establishment, it served as a venue for the presentation of original Taiwanese music by the holding of two annual events, the "Euterpe: Spring & Autumn." many years of careful cultivation and hard work earned praises from every sector in the society. The Hong-Gah Museum has long been devoting itself to educational courses and lectures to promote aesthetic education in the community. On top of that, it serves as a platform for the showcase of contemporary art via regular themed events such as the biennial "Taiwan International Video Art Exhibition" and solo exhibitions of artists from home and abroad.

The Hong-Gah Museum expects itself to be the starting point of profound art cultivation, through the promotion of community culture, elevating the spiritual life of the public and ultimately demonstrating local community's cultural landscape in warmth and of humanity.

== Chronicles ==
1999 Hong-Gah Museum officially opened to the public on October 25.

2003 Became an official member of the Local Cultural Museums of the Council of Cultural Affairs.

2004 Co-founded "Vision and Beyond – Techno Art Creation Project" with the National Culture and Arts Foundation.

2008 Relocated to its current location on the 11th floor of the Huan-Yu Trade Building.

2008 Established the Taiwan International Video Art Exhibition.

2010 Co-organized the "Curator's Incubator Program @ Hong-Gah Museum" with the National Culture and Arts Foundation.

2010 Held artist Chou Yu-Cheng's solo exhibition "TOA Lighting" which won the Annual Visual Arts Award of the 9th Taishin Visual Arts Award.

2012 "Dwelling Place?! Eattopia:" combined the first two Taiwan International Video Art Exhibitions and toured to the Kaohsiung Museum of Fine Arts and various colleges and universities.

2014 Collaborated with the Beitou Culture Foundation to launch a community engagement art project.

2014 Won the 18th Taipei Culture Awards.

2016 Held artist Hsu Chia-Wei's solo exhibition "Huai Mo Village" which won the Grand Prize of the 15th Taishin Arts Awards.

2019 Held artist Chen I-Hsuen's solo exhibition "Commissioned" which won the Visual Arts Award of the 18th Taishin Visual Arts Awards.

2020 Collaborated with the Taiwan Contemporary Culture Lab (C-LAB) to present the 7th Taiwan International Video Art Exhibition "ANIMA" for the first time in a dual exhibition space formats.

2021 Mr. Andrew Chew, the founder of the Hong-Gah Museum, was awarded the Taiwanese Cultural Collaboration Medal by the Ministry of Culture.

2022 Held "The Ocean and the interpreters" curated by Takamori Nobuo which won the Visual Arts Award of the 21th Taishin Visual Arts Awards.

== Transportation ==
The museum is accessible within walking distance West from Qiyan Station (Red line) of the Taipei Metro.
