= Jiantan metro station =

Metro station in Taipei, Taiwan

Jiantan 劍潭
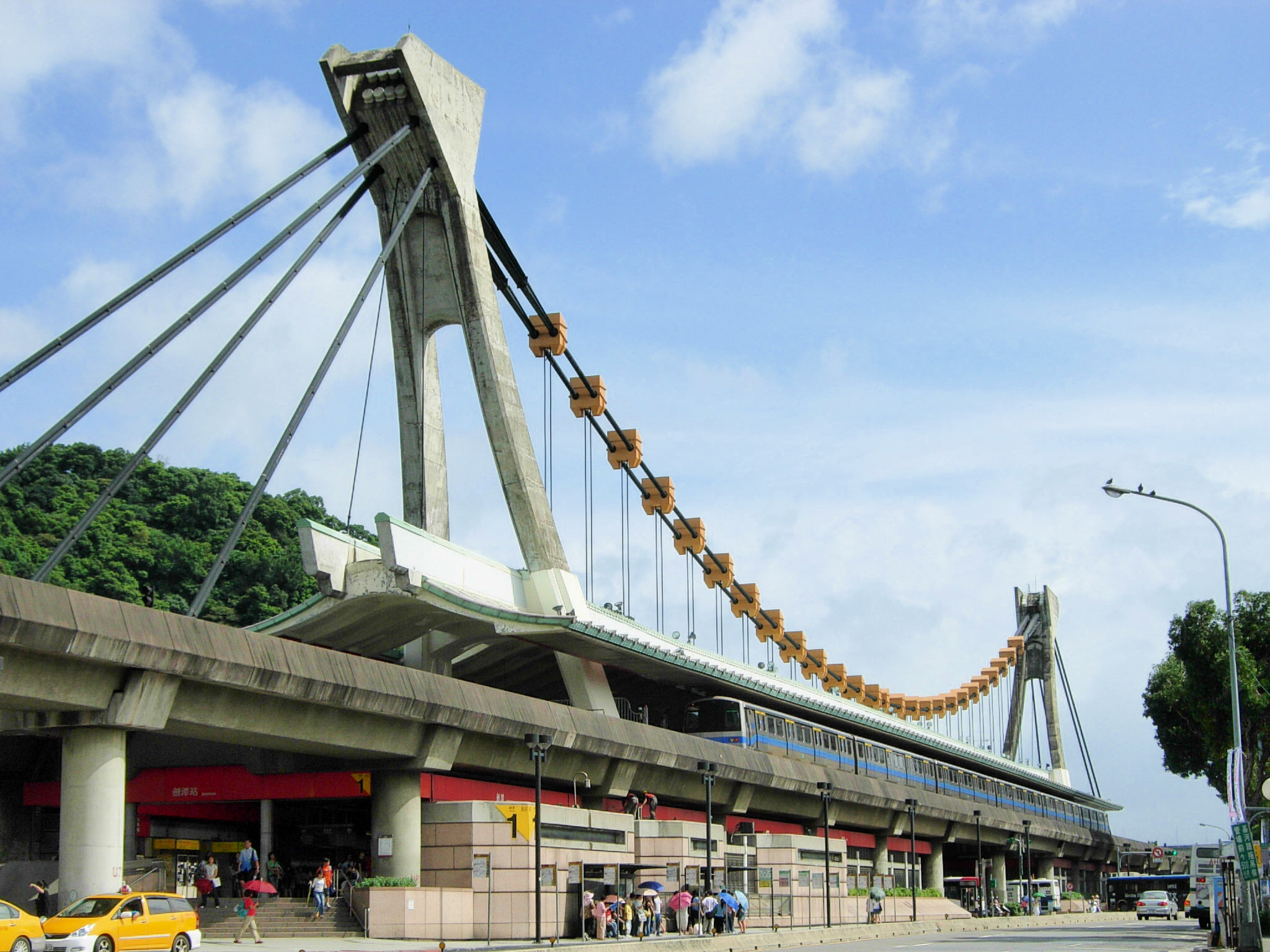
- Exterior

Chinese name
- Traditional Chinese: 劍潭
- Simplified Chinese: 剑潭
- Literal meaning: Sword pond
Transcriptions
Standard Mandarin
- Hanyu Pinyin: Jiàntán
- Bopomofo: ㄐㄧㄢˋ ㄊㄢˊ
- Wade–Giles: Chien⁴-t'an²
Southern Min
- Tâi-lô: Kiàm-thâm

General information
- Other names: Taipei Performing Arts Center; 北藝中心
- Location: 65 Sec 5 Zhongshan N Rd; Shilin District, Taipei; Taiwan
- Coordinates: 25.0845°N 121.5251°E
- System: Taipei metro station

Construction
- Structure type: Elevated
- Cycle facilities: Access available

Other information
- Station code: R15
- Website: web.metro.taipei/e/stationdetail2010.asp?ID=R15-057

History
- Opened: 1997-03-28

Passengers
- 2017: 25.424 million per year ▼2.71%
- Rank: (Ranked 24 of 119)

Services
Preceding station	Taipei Metro	Following station
Yuanshan towards Xiangshan or Daan	Tamsui–Xinyi Line	Shilin towards Tamsui or Beitou
Location

Jiantan (Chinese: 劍潭; pinyin: Jiàntán, formerly transliterated as Chientan Station until 2003) is a metro station in Taipei, Taiwan served by Taipei Metro. It is a station on the Tamsui–Xinyi Line. There was a station of the same name on the now-defunct Tamsui railway line, but the TRA station was further south.

== Station overview ==
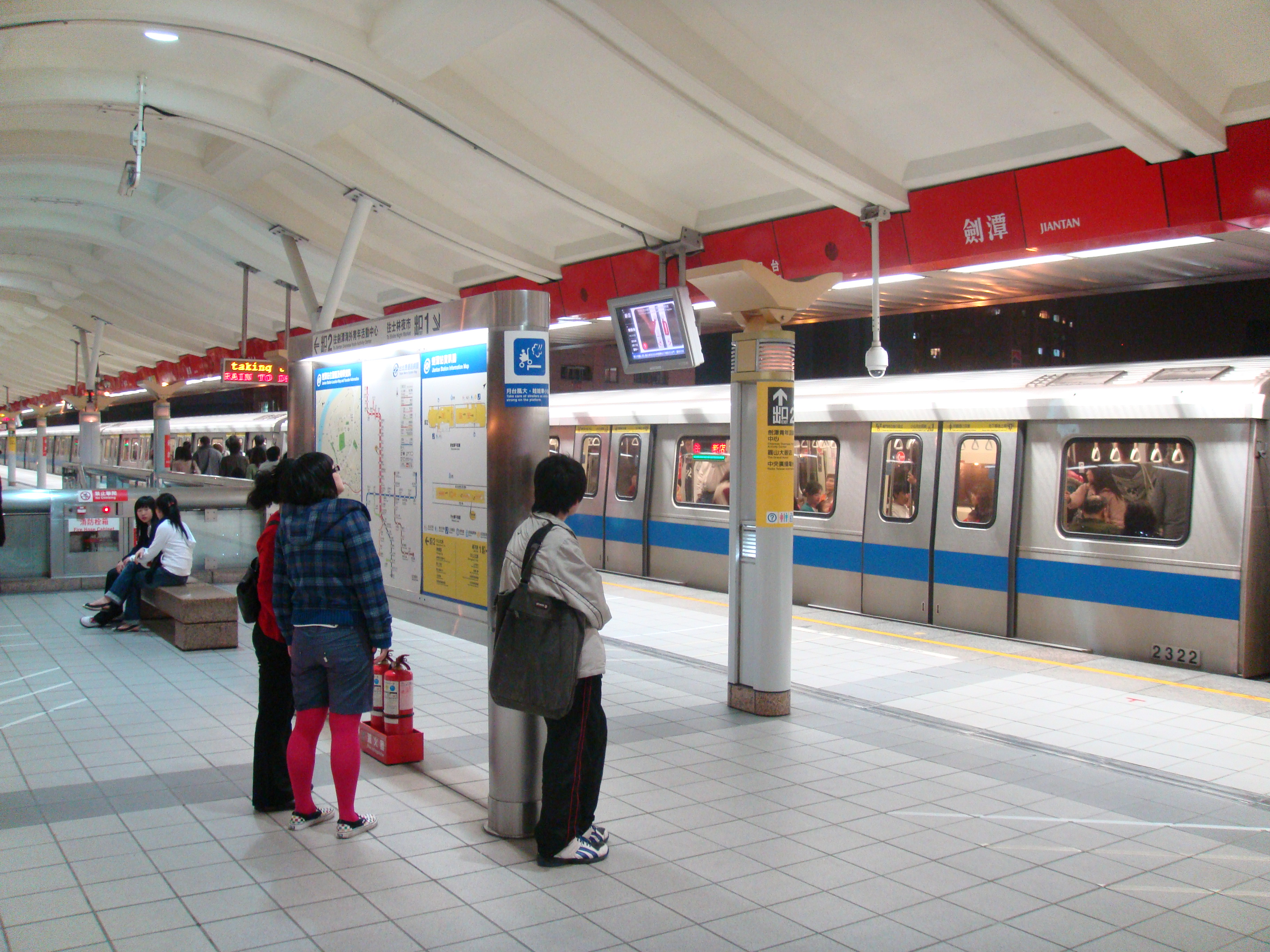
Station platform

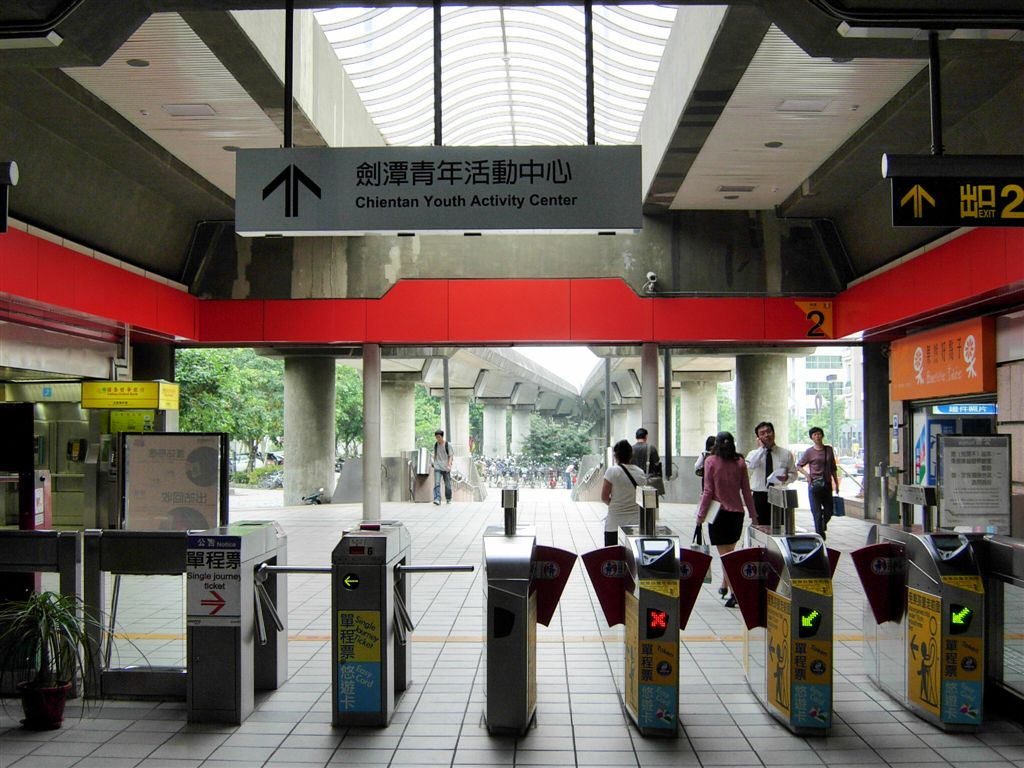
Exit 2 of Jiantan station

This two-level, elevated station structure has one island platform and two side exits. The washrooms are inside the entrance area.

Notable landmarks are National Revolutionary Martyrs' Shrine, Jiantan Park and Ming Chuan University.

This station is well known for its architecture, which is based on a dragon boat. The station is next to the Shilin Night Market and experiences heavy traffic during the evening hours.

Due to its unique dragon boat architecture, it was awarded the 19th Annual Taiwan Architecture Award in 1997.

== History ==
The station was originally opened on 17 August 1915 as Miyanoshita station (Japanese: 宮ノ下乘降場). It was for passengers looking to visit Taiwan Grand Shrine on Jiantan Mountain. The shrine no longer exits; its former location is where the Grand Hotel currently stands. After the war, it was renamed Chientan station and then closed in the 1950s. The location was where the Jiantan Youth Activity Center currently stands.

The Taipei Metro station was originally going to be constructed as two stations: one at the old TRA station location and another one called Mingchuan station. However, residents around the proposed Mingchuan Station opposed the plan. Thus, a station was constructed at the midpoint of the two proposed stations, and was opened on 28 March 1997.

== Station layout ==
2F	Platform 1	← Tamsui–Xinyi line toward Tamsui / Beitou (R16 Shilin)
2F	Island platform, doors will open on the left
2F	Platform 2	→ Tamsui–Xinyi line toward Xiangshan / Daan (R14 Yuanshan) →
Street level	Concourse	Entrance/exit, lobby, information desk, automatic ticket dispensing machines, one-way faregates Restrooms

== First and last train timings ==
The first and last train timings at Jiantan station are as follows:

Destination	First train		Last train
Destination	Mon − Fri	Sat − Sun and P.H.	Daily
Tamsui–Xinyi line
R28 Tamsui	06:00	06:00	00:45
R01Guangci/Fengtian Palace Station	06:00	06:00	00:45
