= Beitou Depot =

Beitou Depot 北投機廠
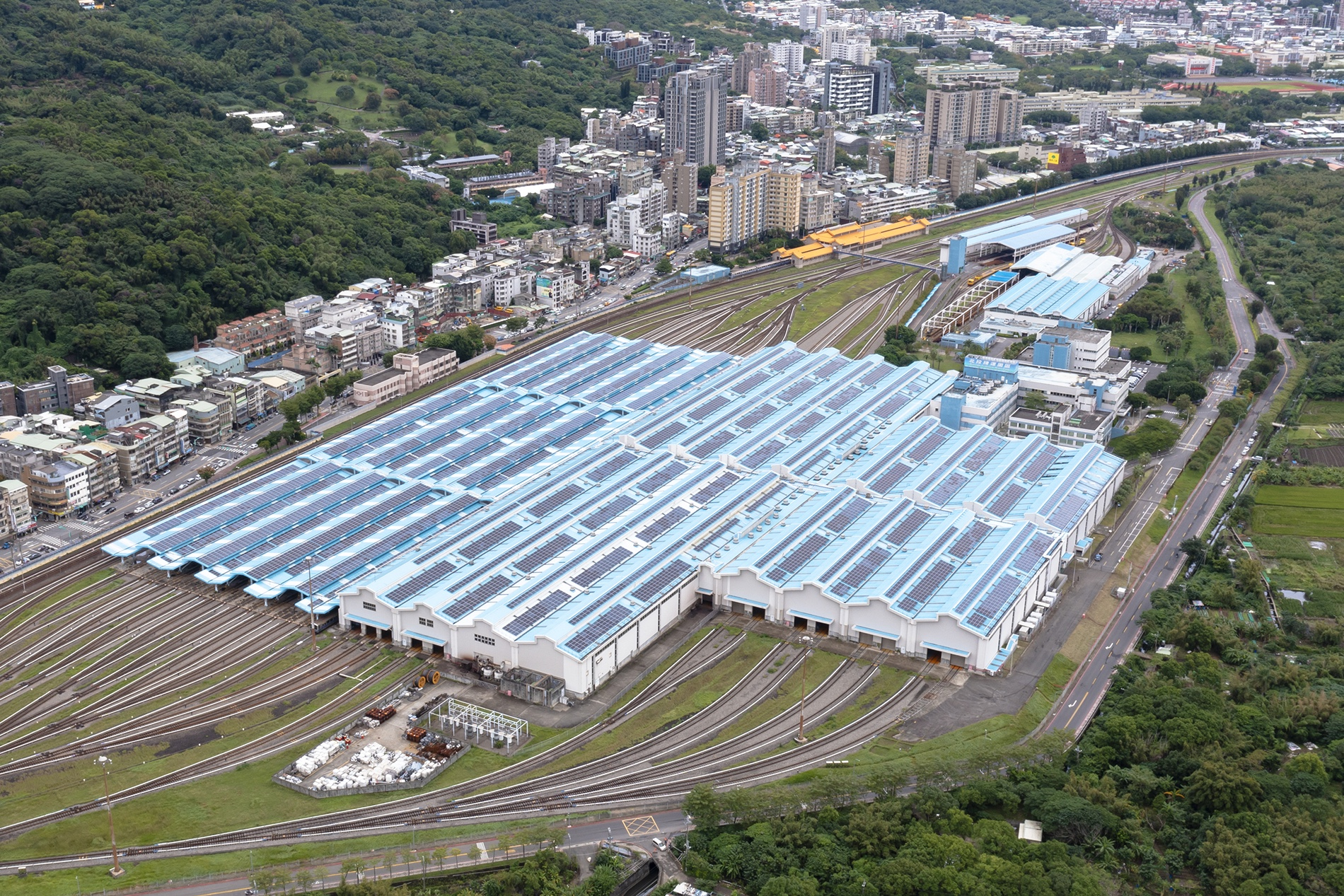
- Aerial view of Beitou Depot from Fuxinggang metro station
- Interactive map of Beitou Depot 北投機廠

Location
- Location: No. 88, Lane 527, Da-Ye Road, Beitou District, 11268, Taipei City, Taiwan.
- Coordinates: 25.1357899°N 121.483955°E

Characteristics
- Operator: Taipei Rapid Transit Corporation
- Type: At grade
- Routes served: Tamsui–Xinyi Line

History
- Opened: March 28, 1997; 29 years ago

The Beitou Depot (Chinese: 北投機廠) is the metro depot of Taipei Metro that began operational on March 28, 1997. It serves the trains of Tamsui-Xinyi Line and Xinbeitou branch line. It is situated to the south of Fuxinggang metro station, at Daye Road, Beitou District, Taipei City, Taiwan.

== Gallery ==
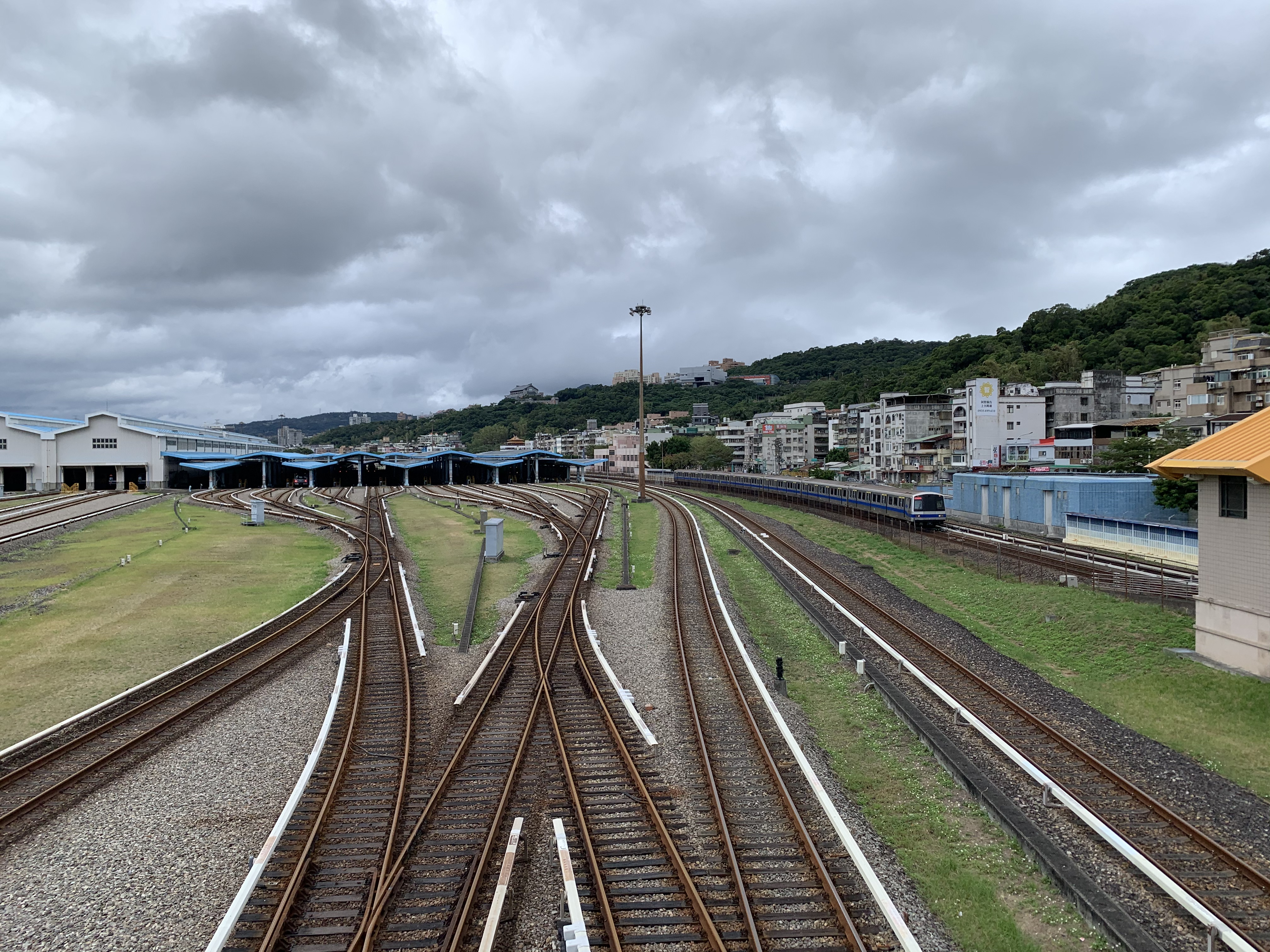
View the train storage area from the footbridge

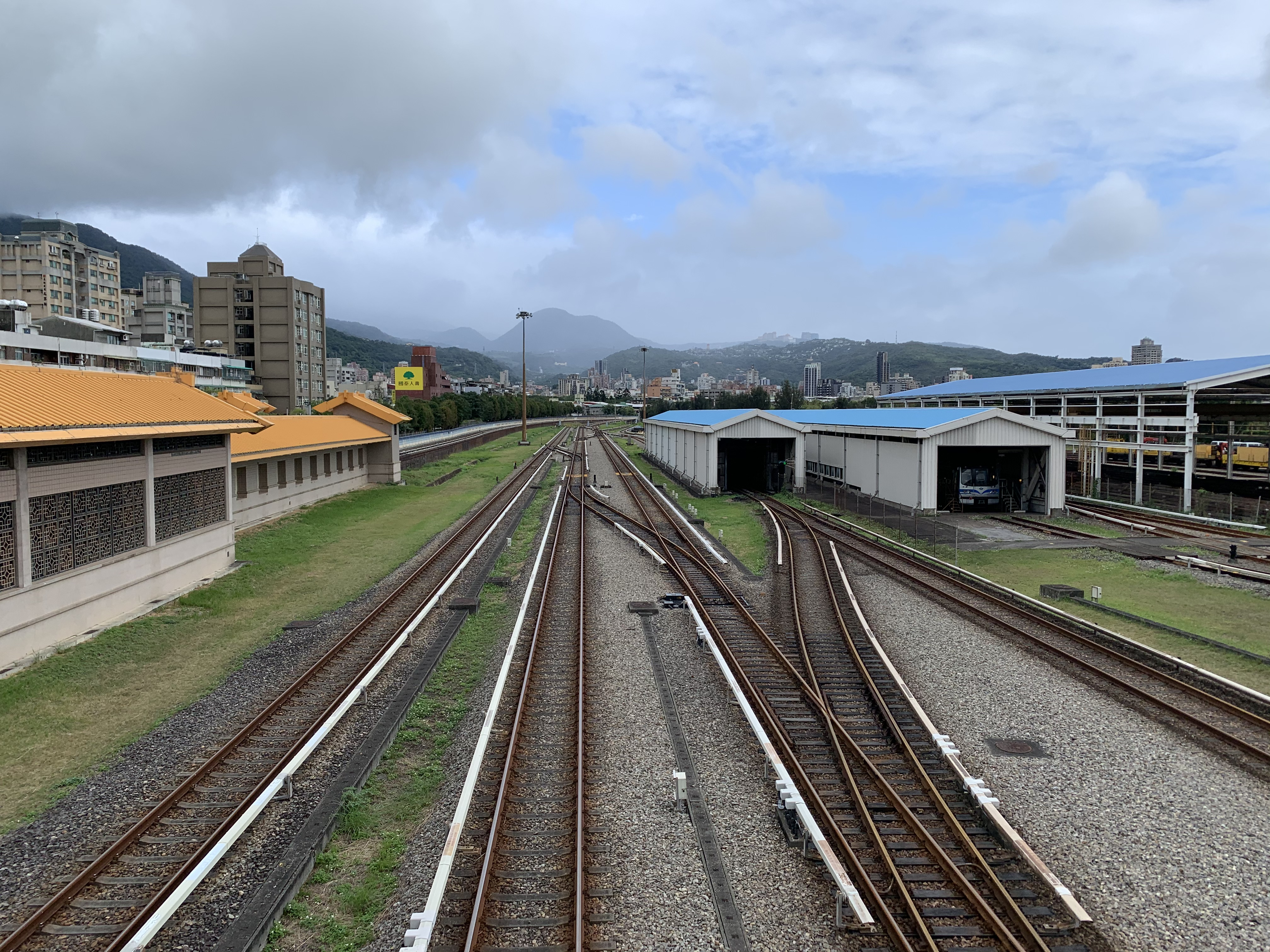
View the east side of the depot from the footbridge

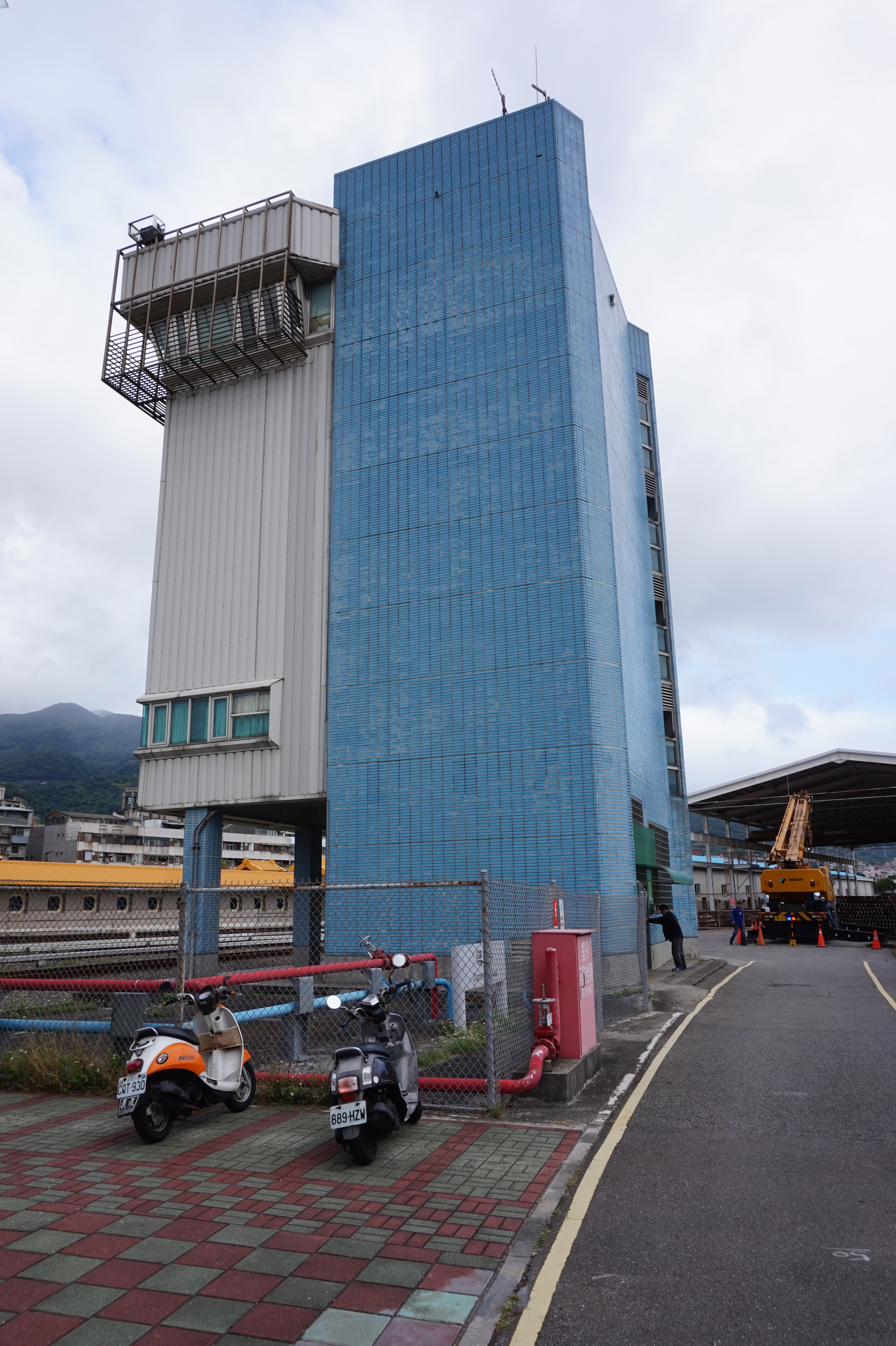
The control tower of Beitou Depot
