= Beitou Presbyterian Church =

Church in Beitou, Taipei, Taiwan

- 長老教會北投教堂
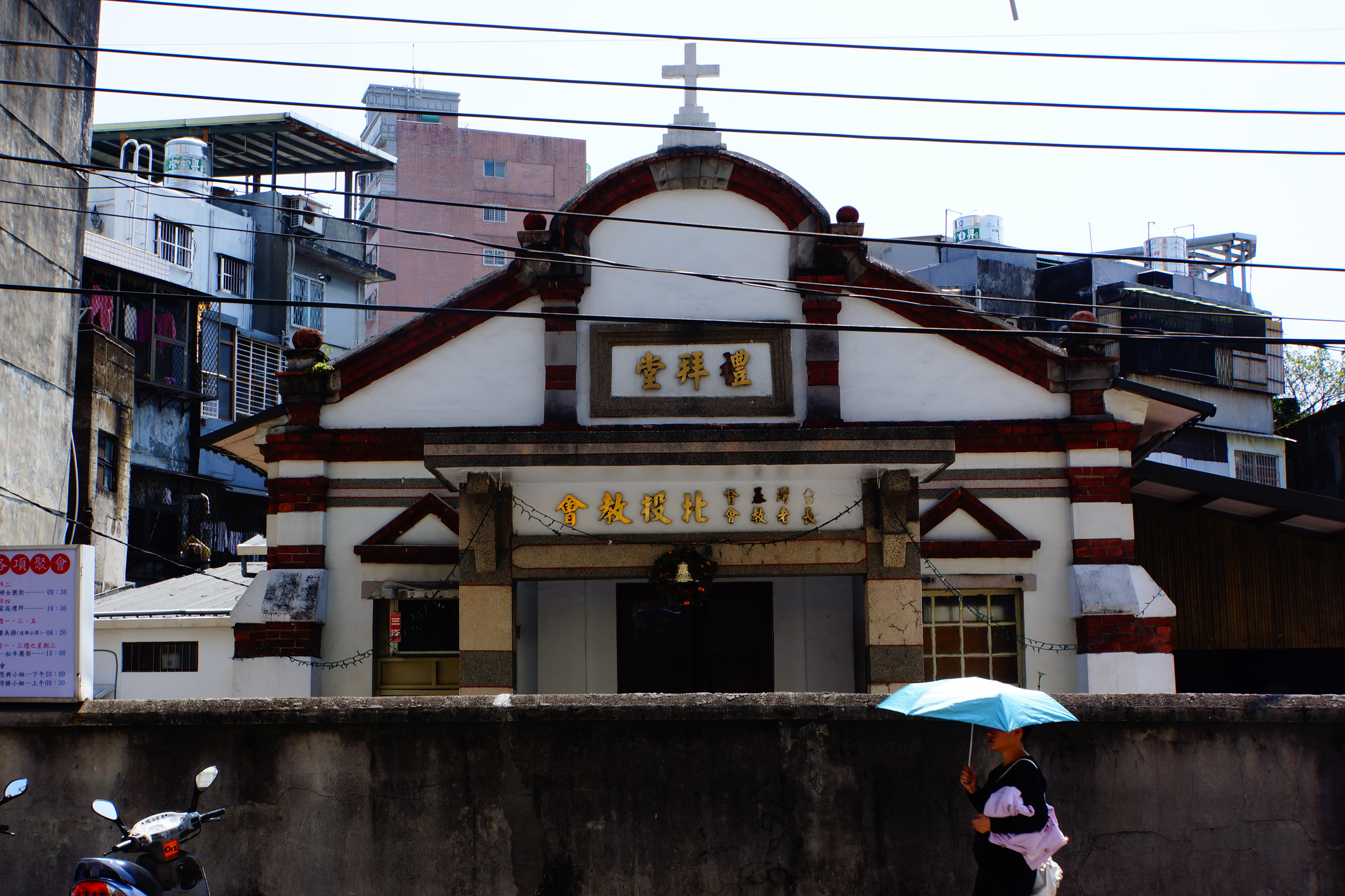
- Beitou Presbyterian Church
- 25°07′52.7″N 121°30′04.9″E
- Location: Beitou, Taipei, Taiwan

Architecture
- Architect: William Gauld
- Architectural type: church
- Completed: 1912

The Beitou Presbyterian Church (traditional Chinese: 長老教會北投教堂; simplified Chinese: 长老教会北投教堂; pinyin: Zhǎnglǎo Jiàohuì Běitóu Jiàotáng) is a presbyterian church in Beitou District, Taipei, Taiwan.

== History ==
The church was established in 1912 by George Leslie Mackay.

== Architecture ==
The church was designed by Canadian Presbyterian missionary William Gauld. It was constructed with red bricks and wooden frame.

== Transportation ==
The church is accessible within walking distance east of Beitou Station of Taipei Metro.

== See also ==
- Christianity in Taiwan
