= Qiyan metro station =

Metro station in Taipei, Taiwan

Qiyan 奇岩
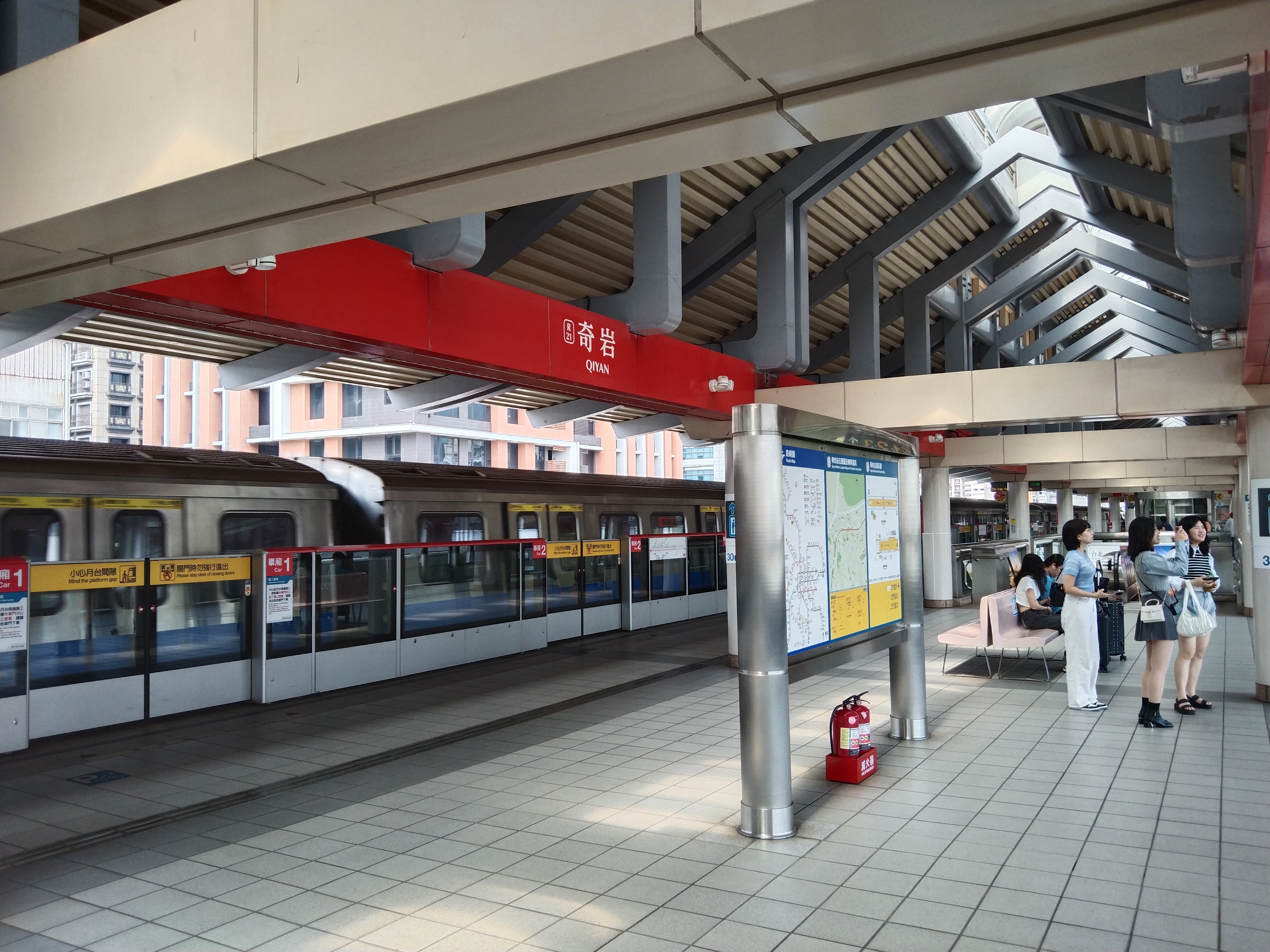
- Qiyan station platform

Chinese name
- Chinese: 奇岩
- Literal meaning: Odd rock
Transcriptions
Standard Mandarin
- Hanyu Pinyin: Qíyán
- Bopomofo: ㄑㄧˊ 一ㄢˊ
- Wade–Giles: Ch'i^{2}-yen^{2}
Hakka
- Pha̍k-fa-sṳ: Khì-ngàm
Southern Min
- Tâi-lô: Khî-giâm

General information
- Location: No. 487, Sanhe Street; Beitou, Taipei; Taiwan
- Coordinates: 25.1257587°N 121.5011573°E
- Operator: Taipei Metro
- Line: Tamsui–Xinyi line
- Connections: Bus stop

Construction
- Structure type: Elevated

Other information
- Station code: R21

History
- Opened: 28 March 1997

Passengers
- daily (December 2024)
- Rank: 85 out of 109

Services
Preceding station	Taipei Metro	Following station
Qilian towards Xiangshan	Tamsui–Xinyi line	Beitou towards Tamsui
Qilian towards Daan	Tamsui–Xinyi line	Beitou Terminus
Location

The Taipei Metro Qiyan station (formerly transliterated as Chiyen station until 2003) is located in the Beitou District of Taipei City, Taiwan. It is a station on the Tamsui–Xinyi line (Red Line).

== Station overview ==
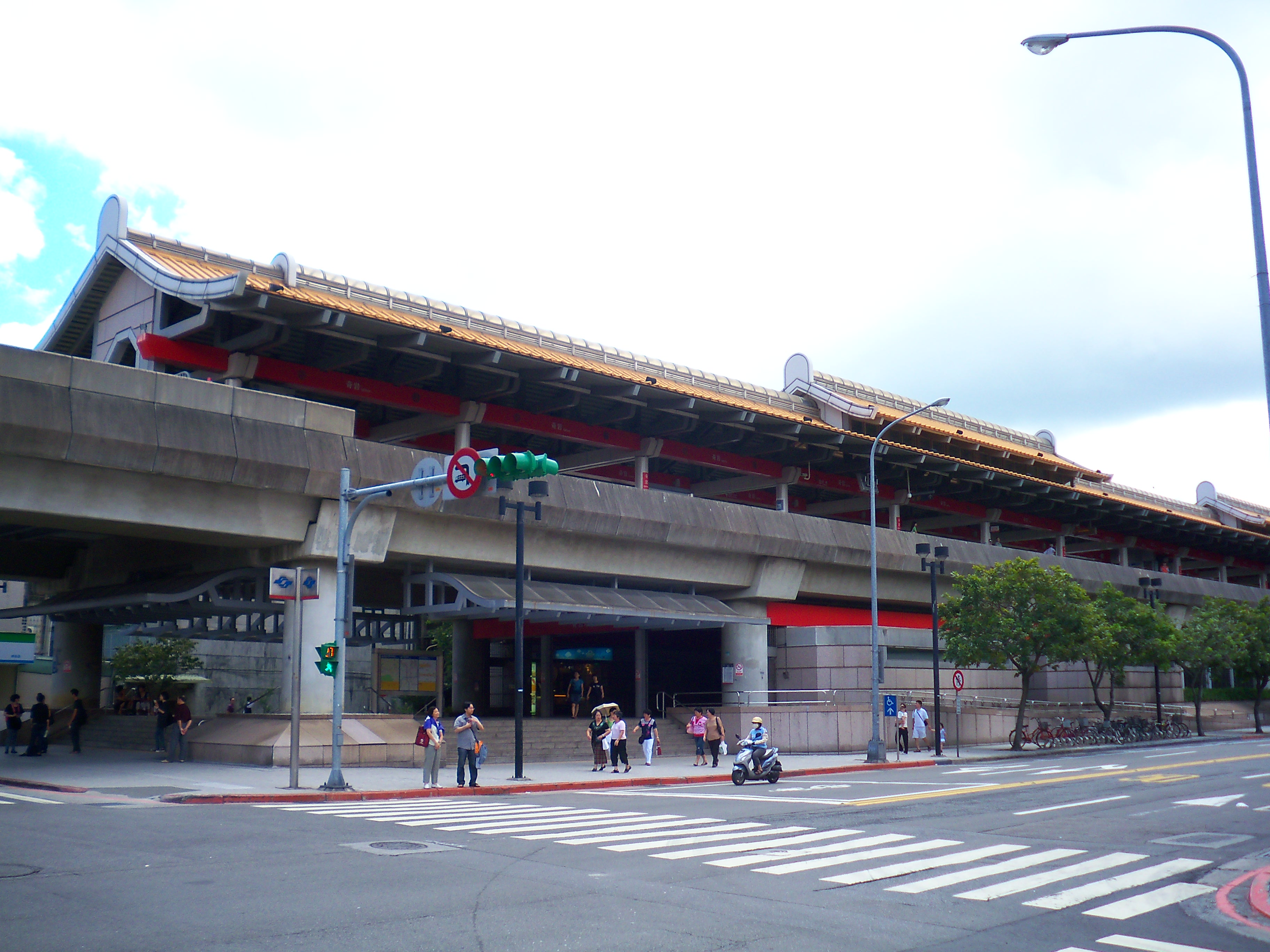
Qiyan station exterior

The two-level, elevated station structure has one island platform and three exits. The station is situated between Beitou Road and the beginning of Sanhe Road. The washrooms are inside the entrance area.

On trains to Beitou, an announcement is made recommending passengers for stations north of Beitou to change trains at this station since Beitou does not offer same platform transfer between trains terminating at Beitou and trains continuing to Tamsui.

The station name is a historic name of the area that literally means "interesting rock", referring to Junjianyan (Chinese: 軍艦岩; pinyin: Jūnjiànyán), a sandstone formation to the east.

== Station layout ==
2F	Platform 1	← Tamsui–Xinyi line toward Tamsui / Beitou (R22 Beitou)
2F	Island platform, doors will open on the left
2F	Platform 2	→ Tamsui–Xinyi line toward Xiangshan / Daan (R20 Qilian) →
Street level	Concourse	Exit to Hong-gah Museum, lobby, information desk, automatic ticket dispensing machines, one-way faregates Restrooms
