= Beitou Cable Car =

Gondola lift in Taipei, Taiwan

The Beitou Cable Car Link Project (traditional Chinese: 北投空中纜車; simplified Chinese: 北投空中缆车; pinyin: Běitóu Kōngzhōng Lǎnchē) is the second cable car line in Taipei after the Maokong Gondola. It is one of the major campaign platforms of Ma Ying-jeou, the former Taipei mayor. The proposed 4.9km Beitou cable car line to ferry tourists between Xinbeitou Station and the Yangmingshan National Park would have four stops, the first of which would be built near the skating rink at Chingshui Park. It would continue to Lungfeng Valley on Yangmingshan, the first parking lot in Yangmingshan National Park, and terminate at the second parking lot.

== Scandals and controversies ==
Taipei City Government structured the Beitou Link Project in a build-operate-transfer (BOT) scheme, and awarded the BOT tender to Rich Development, a local property developer, in 2005. Construction began in early 2006, but the Project was soon mired by a series of scandals. The prosecutors detained Yen Wan-chin, the Deputy Minister of Interior, on 20 July 2006 under corruption charges, but Yen staged a hunger strike in protest of the false allegations. Six other suspects, including officials and contractors, were also arrested under the same charges.

Total project cost for the Beitou Link was budgeted at NT$1 billion (US$31 million) when Ma Ying-jeou announced the BOT tender in 2005, but was increased to NT$2.9 billion (US$89 million) when the Taipei government signed the concession contract, and further to NT$3.3 billion (US$102 million) in the construction period. Local critics also questioned its controversial evasion of environmental impact assessment and possible misappropriation of state properties.

Taiwan laws call for state-administered environmental impact statement for all development projects within the national parks, regardless of the project size. A local environmental protection group openly blasted Ma as "incompetent and shameful" for approving a change to the concession contract to allow construction of hotels and spa resorts in the national park without a required environmental impact assessment, and misappropriating two additional land slots totaling 4.1 hectares to the Project.

Taiwan's Ministry of Interior revoked all construction permits of the project for the illegal evasion of environmental impact assessment, and Ma also agreed to halt the construction before all legal proceedings settle.

According to Liberty Times, one of the three largest newspapers in Taiwan, a discussion thread about this scandal on SocialForce, an independent internet forum advocating against abuse of power by local media, began to gather popularity with many surfers contributing new allegations against Ma. A blogger filed these allegations to local prosecutors.
