= Tamsui–Xinyi Line =

Metro line in Taipei

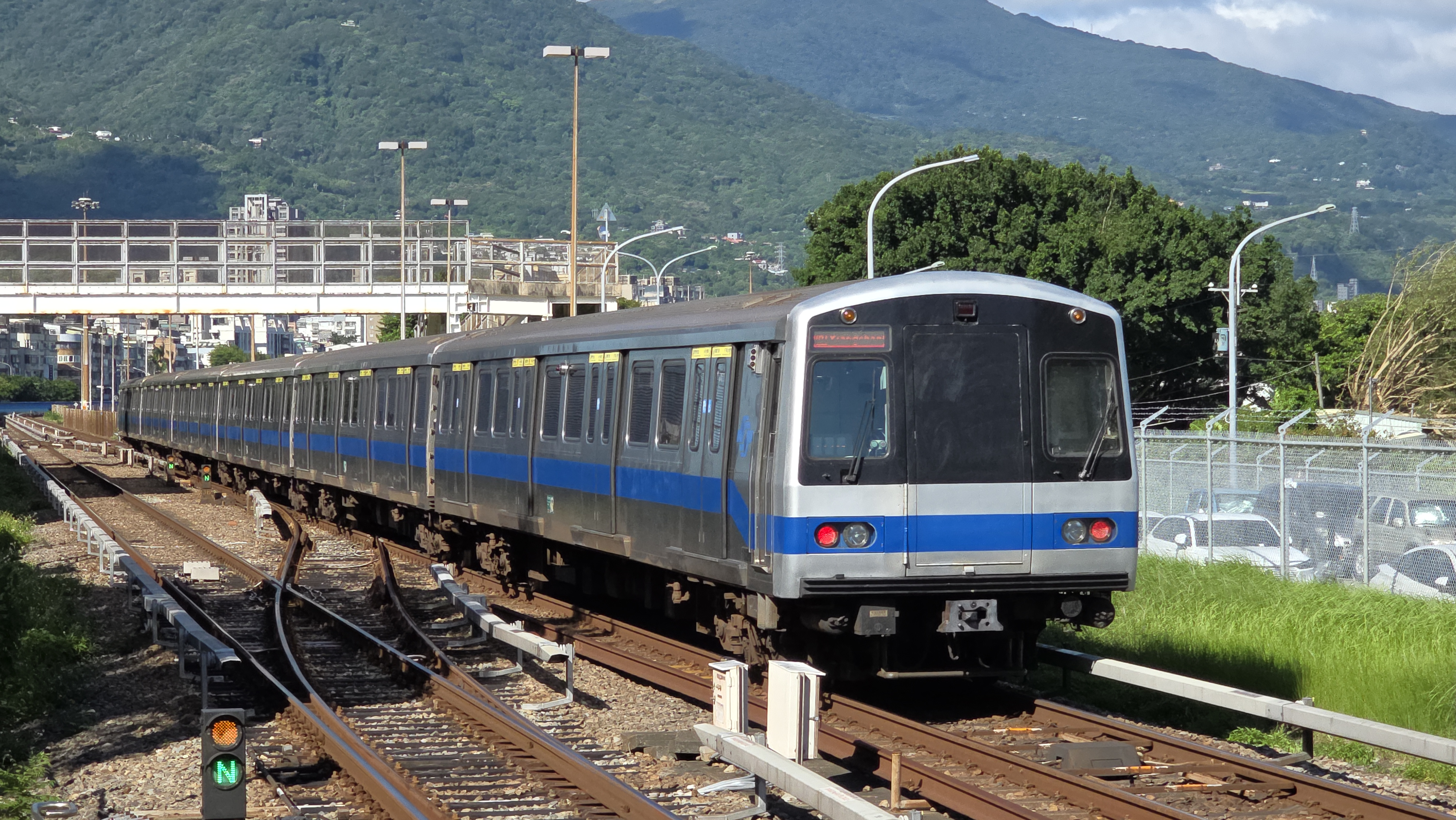
- A C301 trainset for Xiangshan leaves Zhongyi (Shot on August 14, 2025)

Overview
- Other name: Red Line
- Native name: 淡水信義線
- Status: In service
- Owner: Taipei DORTS
- Line number: R
- Locale: Taipei and New Taipei, Taiwan
- Termini: Guangci/Fengtian Temple; Tamsui
- Stations: 30
- Color on map: Red

Service
- Type: Rapid transit
- System: Taipei Metro
- Services: Tamsui–Guangci/Fengtian Temple (full); Beitou–Daan (short-turn); Beitou–Xinbeitou (branch)
- Operator: Taipei Rapid Transit Corporation
- Depot: Beitou
- Rolling stock: C301; C381

History
- Opened: March 28, 1997; 29 years ago
- Last extension: August 30, 2026

Technical
- Line length: 30.2 km (18.8 mi) (including Xinbeitou)
- Character: Elevated, at-grade, and underground
- Track gauge: 1,435 mm (4 ft 8 1/2 in) standard gauge
- Electrification: 750 V DC third rail
- Operating speed: 80 km/h (50 mph)

Tamsui–Xinyi Line
- Traditional Chinese: 淡水信義線
- Simplified Chinese: 淡水信义线
Transcriptions
Standard Mandarin
- Hanyu Pinyin: Dànshuǐ-Xìnyì Xiàn
Hakka
- Pha̍k-fa-sṳ: Tham-súi–Sin-ngi Sien
Southern Min
- Hokkien POJ: Tām-chúi Sìn-gī Soàⁿ

Red Line
- Traditional Chinese: 紅線
- Simplified Chinese: 红线
Transcriptions
Standard Mandarin
- Hanyu Pinyin: Hóng Xiàn
- Wade–Giles: Hung^{2} Hsien^{4}
- Tongyong Pinyin: Hóng Siàn
Hakka
- Pha̍k-fa-sṳ: Fùng Sien
Southern Min
- Hokkien POJ: Âng Soàⁿ

The Tamsui–Xinyi Line (Chinese: 淡水信義線), also known as Red Line (Chinese: 紅線), is a metro line in Taipei operated by Taipei Metro. It is named after the districts it connects: Tamsui and Xinyi. It includes a total of 29 stations serving the Tamsui, Beitou, Shilin, Datong, Zhongshan, Zhongzheng, Daan, and Xinyi districts. At 30.2 km (18.8 mi), it is currently the longest line of the Taipei Metro.

The line is split into two parts, the Tamsui Line and the Xinyi Line.

The Tamsui Line section runs mostly along the former Tamsui line. Most of the tracks and stations have been renovated there, except in the Zhongzheng district, where a new tunnel was constructed due to a lack of surface right-of-way.

After Taipei Main Station, the line runs under Gongyuan Road and serves NTU Hospital station, then cuts through a handful of buildings and arrive at Chiang Kai-Shek Memorial Hall station on Roosevelt Road.

The Xinyi Line mostly runs under Xinyi Road with the exception for the section between Chiang Kai-Shek Memorial Hall station and Dongmen station, where the line runs through the garden of Chiang Kai-Shek Memorial Hall.

The Red Line is a high-capacity rapid transit system. The route and stations between and including Minquan West Road and Guangci/Fengtian Temple are underground; the routes and stations between and including Yuanshan and Beitou are elevated; Xinbeitou station is elevated; the route and stations between and including Fuxinggang and Hongshulin are ground level; and Tamsui station is elevated.

It has connecting tracks to both the Songshan–Xindian line and the Zhonghe–Xinlu line.

== History ==
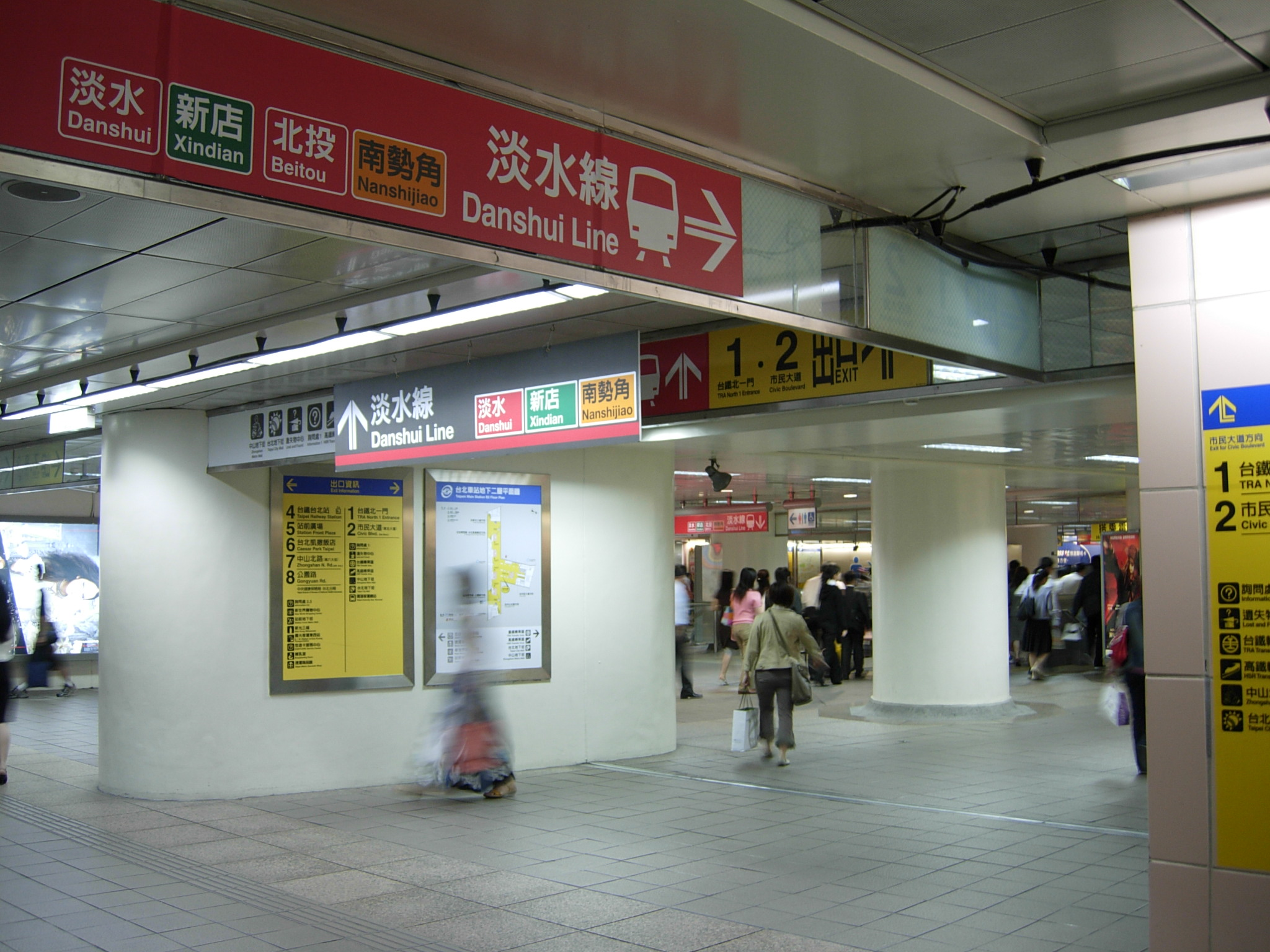
A sign at Taipei Main Station in 2007. The line, then known as Tamsui and romanised as Danshui line, operated to Nanshijiao and Xindian.

For 15 years, trains operated between Tamsui and Xindian via the southern part of the current Songshan–Xindian Line, making it the longest-serving former service of the system, followed closely by a 13 year service from Beitou to Nanshijiao via the southern part of the current Zhonghe–Xinlu Line. With the completion of Dongmen station, Xinyi Line, and Songshan line, both services ended, placing the current form of the Tamsui–Xinyi Line into effect.

- July 1988: Tamsui Line begins construction.
- March 28, 1997: Tamsui Line begins service from Tamsui to Zhongshan.
- December 25, 1997: The section from Zhongshan to Taipei Main Station begins service.
- December 24, 1998: The section from Taipei Main Station to Chiang Kai-shek Memorial Hall begins service. The section of Chiang Kai-shek Memorial Hall and Guting on the Xindian line opened along with the Zhonghe line, allowing trains from Tamsui to travel to Nanshijiao.
- November 11, 1999: The rest of the Xindian line opened. Trains from Tamsui traveled to Xindian and the Zhonghe line route was cut back to Beitou.
- November 1, 2002: Ground broken on Xinyi Line construction.
- February 12, 2010: Corridor approved by the Executive Yuan for the Xinyi Line eastern extension.
- July 15, 2010: The last section of shield tunneling is completed, marking the completion of tunnel construction.
- September 29, 2012: With the opening of Dongmen the last trains between Beitou and Nanshijiao were launched ending the through services; trains now operate between Nanshijiao and Huilong or Luzhou. A new shuttle service from Beitou to the Taipower Building was added temporarily until the Xinyi Line opened.
- October 15, 2013: Xinyi Line completed its preliminary inspection.
- November 23, 2013: With the opening of the Xinyi Line, the last trains of the Beitou-Taipower Building shuttle service were launched; trains operated between Beitou and Xiangshan and between Taipower Building and Ximen via the Xiaonanmen line.
- November 24, 2013: The section between Chiang Kai-shek Memorial Hall and Xiangshan opened and began revenue service.
- November 14, 2014: With the opening of the Songshan line, the last trains between Tamsui and Xindian were launched at 12:00 on November 15, 2014, ending the through services; trains now operate between Xindian or Taipower Building and Songshan and between Tamsui or Beitou (Note: Short-turn service) and Daan or Xiangshan.
- September 2019: With the platform gates at Fuxinggang Station (August 2018) put into operation, all platform gate projects on this route have been completed.
- June 20, 2019: The "Xinbeitou-Daan" shuttle service begins its trial operation. It is decided not to move forward with this service.

== Services ==
The typical off-peak service is:

- 8 trains per hour between Tamsui and Guangci/Fengtian Temple
- 7 trains per hour between Beitou and Daan

== Stations ==
Code	Station name	Station type		Locale		Sta. distance (km)		Opened date	Transfer
Code	Station name	Structure	Platform	Locale		Previous	Total	Opened date	Transfer
Tamsui-Xinyi line
R01	Guangci/Fengtian Temple 廣慈/奉天宮	Underground	Island	Xinyi	Taipei	0.00	—N/a	2026-08-30	—N/a
R02	Xiangshan 象山	Underground	Island	Xinyi	Taipei	0.90	0.90	2013-11-24	Circular Line
R03	Taipei 101/World Trade Center 台北101/世貿	Underground	Island	Xinyi	Taipei	0.74	1.64	2013-11-24	—N/a
R04	Xinyi Anhe 信義安和	Underground	Island	Daan	Taipei	0.99	2.63	2013-11-24	—N/a
R05	Daan 大安	Underground	Island	Daan	Taipei	0.99	3.62	2013-11-24	Wenhu Line
R06	Daan Park 大安森林公園	Underground	Island	Daan	Taipei	0.79	4.41	2013-11-24	—N/a
R07	Dongmen 東門	Underground	Island/split	Daan	Taipei	0.67	5.08	2012-9-30	Zhonghe–Xinlu Line
R08	Chiang Kai-shek Memorial Hall 中正紀念堂	Underground	Island/split	Zhongzheng	Taipei	1.56	6.64	1998-12-24	Songshan–Xindian Line; Wanda–Shulin Line
R09	NTU Hospital 台大醫院	Underground	Island	Zhongzheng	Taipei	0.99	7.63	1998-12-24	—N/a
R10	Taipei Main Station 台北車站	Underground	Island	Zhongzheng	Taipei	0.63	8.26	1997-12-25	Bannan Line; Western Trunk line Taiwan High Speed Rail; Taoyuan Airport MRT (A1)
R11	Zhongshan 中山	Underground	Island	Datong	Taipei	0.66	8.92	1997-3-28	Songshan–Xindian Line
R12	Shuanglian 雙連	Underground	Island	Datong	Taipei	0.55	9.47	1997-3-28	Minsheng–Xizhi line
R13	Minquan West Road 民權西路	Underground	Island	Datong	Taipei	0.53	10.00	1997-3-28	Zhonghe–Xinlu Line
R14	Yuanshan 圓山	Elevated	Island	Datong	Taipei	1.03	11.03	1997-3-28	—N/a
R15	Jiantan 劍潭	Elevated	Island	Shilin	Taipei	1.52	12.55	1997-3-28	—N/a
R16	Shilin 士林	Elevated	Island	Shilin	Taipei	1.09	13.64	1997-3-28	Circular Line
R17	Zhishan 芝山	Elevated	Island	Shilin	Taipei	1.10	14.74	1997-3-28	Shezi Line
R18	Mingde 明德	Elevated	Island	Beitou	Taipei	0.88	15.62	1997-3-28	—N/a
R19	Shipai 石牌	Elevated	Island	Beitou	Taipei	0.60	16.22	1997-3-28	—N/a
R20	Qilian 唭哩岸	Elevated	Island	Beitou	Taipei	1.26	17.48	1997-3-28	—N/a
R21	Qiyan 奇岩	Elevated	Island	Beitou	Taipei	0.83	18.31	1997-3-28	—N/a
R22	Beitou 北投	Elevated	Hybrid	Beitou	Taipei	0.76	19.07	1997-3-28	Xinbeitou Branch Line
R23	Fuxinggang 復興崗	Ground	Side	Beitou	Taipei	1.61	20.68	1997-3-28	—N/a
R24	Zhongyi 忠義	Ground	Side	Beitou	Taipei	1.45	22.13	1997-3-28	—N/a
R25	Guandu 關渡	Ground	Side	Beitou	Taipei	0.87	23.00	1997-3-28	—N/a
R26	Zhuwei 竹圍	Ground	Side	Tamsui	New Taipei	2.14	25.14	1997-3-28	—N/a
R27	Hongshulin 紅樹林	Ground	Side	Tamsui	New Taipei	1.91	27.05	1997-3-28	Danhai LRT
R28	Tamsui 淡水	Elevated	Island	Tamsui	New Taipei	2.09	29.14	1997-3-28	Danhai LRT
Xinbeitou branch line		Elevated	Island						
R22	Beitou 北投	Elevated	Hybrid	Beitou	Taipei	—N/a	0.00	1997-3-28	Tamsui-Xinyi-line
R22A	Xinbeitou 新北投	Elevated	Island	Beitou	Taipei	1.03	1.03	1997-3-28	—N/a

== See also ==
- Xinbeitou branch line
- Tamsui-Xindian-Zhonghe line, a former service of the Metro using sections of track
