= Fuxinggang metro station =

Taipei Metro Tamsui line station

Fuxinggang 復興崗
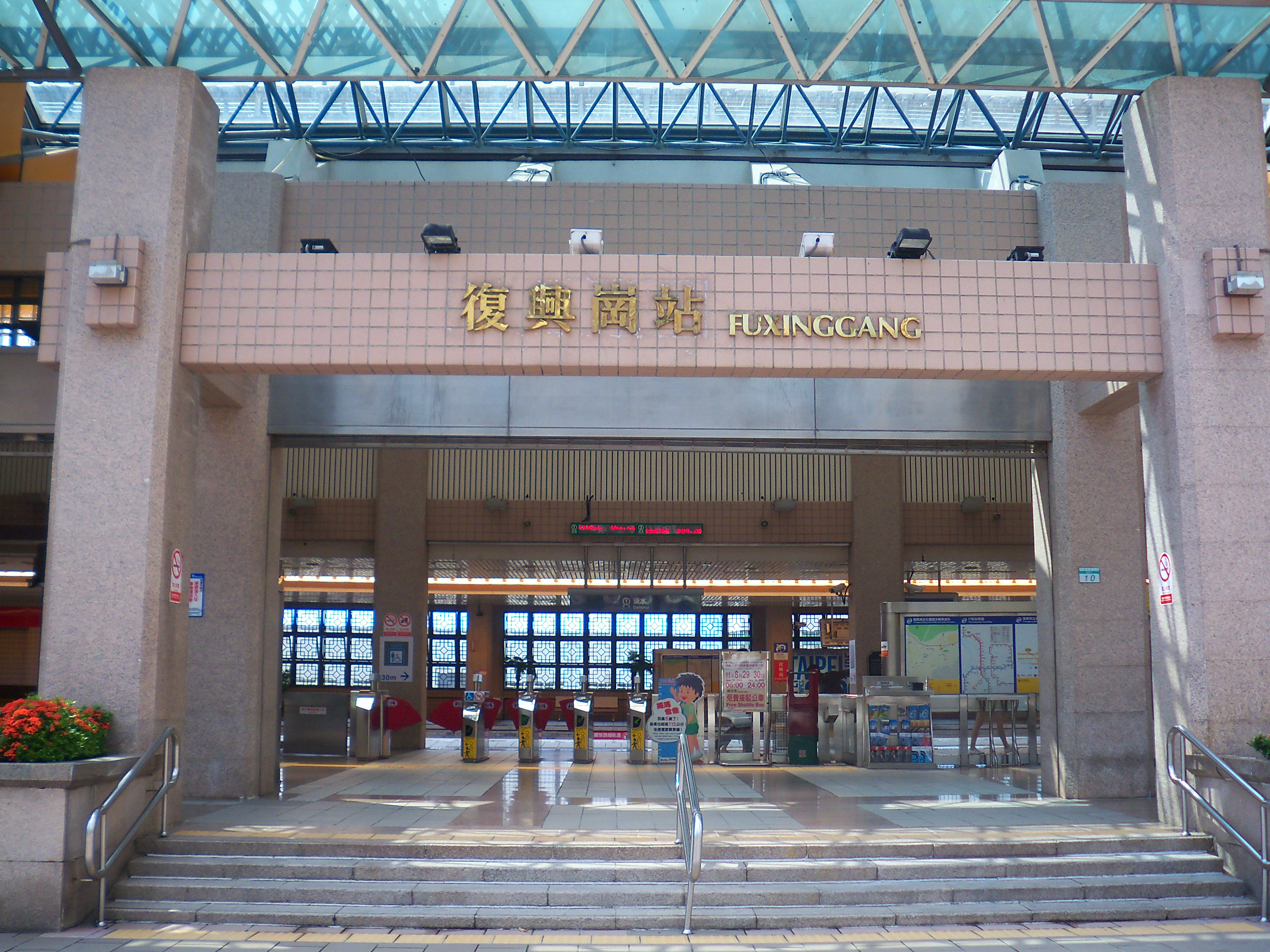
- Fuxinggang station entrance

Chinese name
- Traditional Chinese: 復興崗
- Simplified Chinese: 复兴岗
Transcriptions
Standard Mandarin
- Hanyu Pinyin: Fùxīnggāng
- Bopomofo: ㄈㄨˋ ㄒㄧㄥ ㄍㄤ
- Wade–Giles: Fu^{4}-hsing^{1} Kang^{1}
Hakka
- Pha̍k-fa-sṳ: Fu̍k-hîn-kông
Southern Min
- Hokkien POJ: Ho̍k-heng-kang
- Tâi-lô: Ho̍k-hing-kong

General information
- Location: No. 10, Lane 53, Zhongyang North Road, Sec. 3 Beitou, Taipei; Taiwan
- Coordinates: 25.1375146°N 121.4854476°E
- Operator: Taipei Metro
- Line: Tamsui–Xinyi Line
- Connections: Bus stop

Construction
- Structure type: At-Grade

Other information
- Station code: R23

History
- Opened: March 28, 1997

Passengers
- 7,883 daily (December 2024)
- Rank: (Ranked 106 of 119)

Services
Preceding station	Taipei Metro	Following station
Beitou towards Xiangshan	Tamsui–Xinyi Line	Zhongyi towards Tamsui
Location

Fuxinggang station (Chinese: 復興崗; pinyin: Fùxīnggāng; formerly transliterated as Fuhsing Kang Station until 2003) is a Taipei Metro station on the Tamsui–Xinyi Line located in Beitou District, Taipei, Taiwan. In the past, the station belonged to the now-defunct TRA Tamsui line.

The name of the station is derived from the nearby Fu Hsing Kang College, a military academy. The Taipei Metro Beitou Depot is located directly south of the station.

== Station overview ==
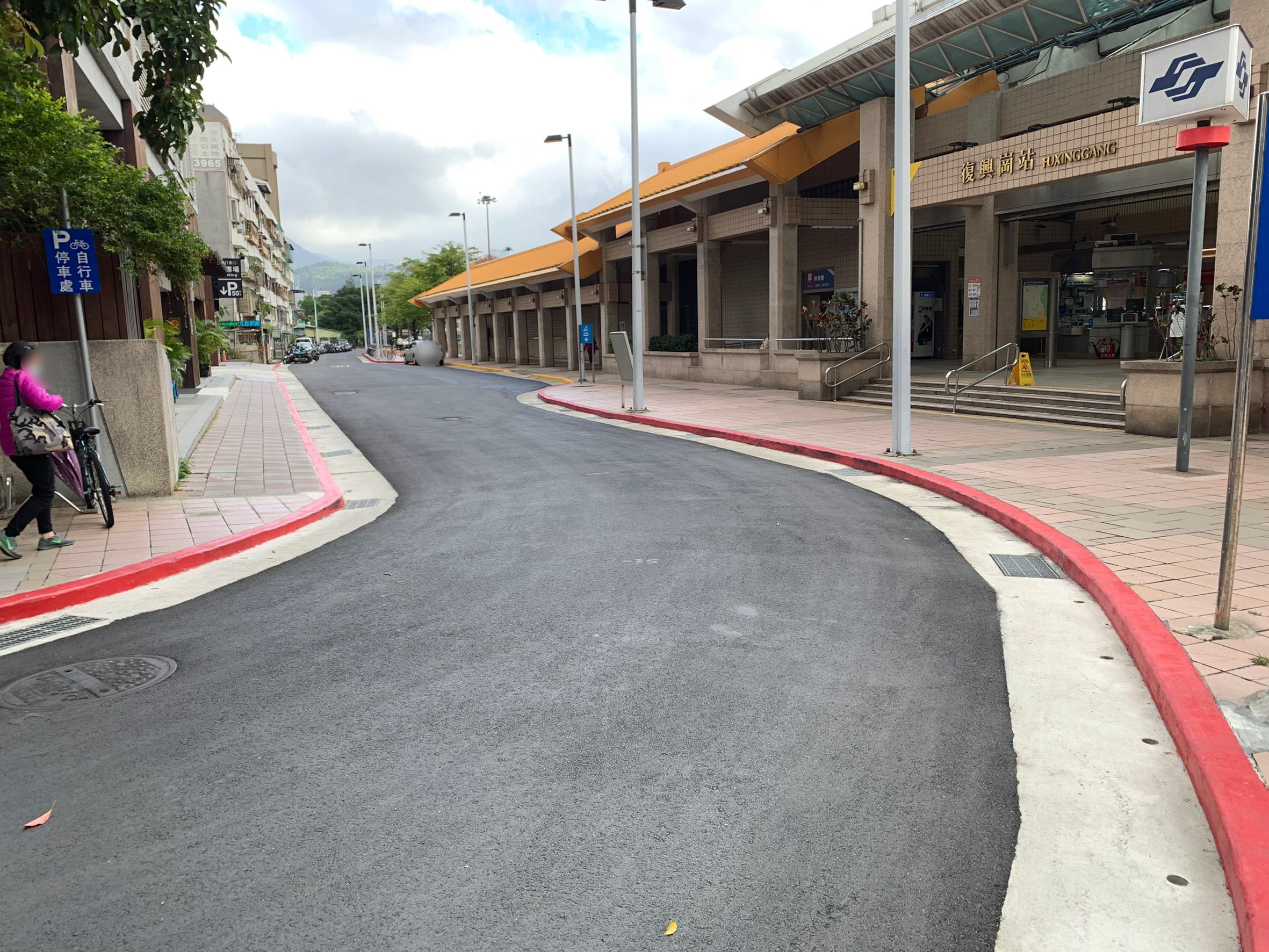
Fuxinggang station front

The station is at-grade with two side platforms connected via skyway and hosts two exits; exit 1 is at grade and faces north towards Zhongyang North Road, while exit 2 is located at the southern end of the skyway and leads into Beitou Depot via a bridge. The washrooms are inside the entrance area.

== History ==
This station was opened temporarily as Shenyunhui Station (Chinese: 省運會車站), a TRA railway station, from October 25 to 31, 1954 for the national sports day event held at Fu Hsing Kang College. The metro station was opened on March 28, 1997.

== Station layout ==
2F	Connecting level	Entrance/exit, skyway for platform connection
Street level
Street level	Concourse (to Platform 1)
Street level	Concourse (to Platform 1)	Entrance/exit, lobby, information desk, automatic ticket dispensing machines, one-way faregates Restrooms
Street level	Side platform, doors will open on the right
Street level	Platform 1	← Tamsui–Xinyi line toward Tamsui (R24 Zhongyi)
Street level	Platform 2	→ Tamsui–Xinyi line toward Xiangshan (R22 Beitou)→
Street level	Side platform, doors will open on the right

== First and last train timings ==
The first and last train timings at Fuxinggang station are as follows:

Destination	First train		Last train
Destination	Mon − Fri	Sat − Sun and P.H.	Daily
Tamsui–Xinyi line
R28 Tamsui	06:06	06:06	01:03
R01guangci/fengtian palace station	06:02	06:02	00:27

== Trivia ==
The only pedestrian bridge over the tracks of Beitou Depot is located beyond exit 2 of the station with no other access, necessitating travelling through the station (and paying a NT$20 fare if not already in the station) for transit.
