= Qilian metro station =

Metro station in Taipei, Taiwan

Qilian 唭哩岸
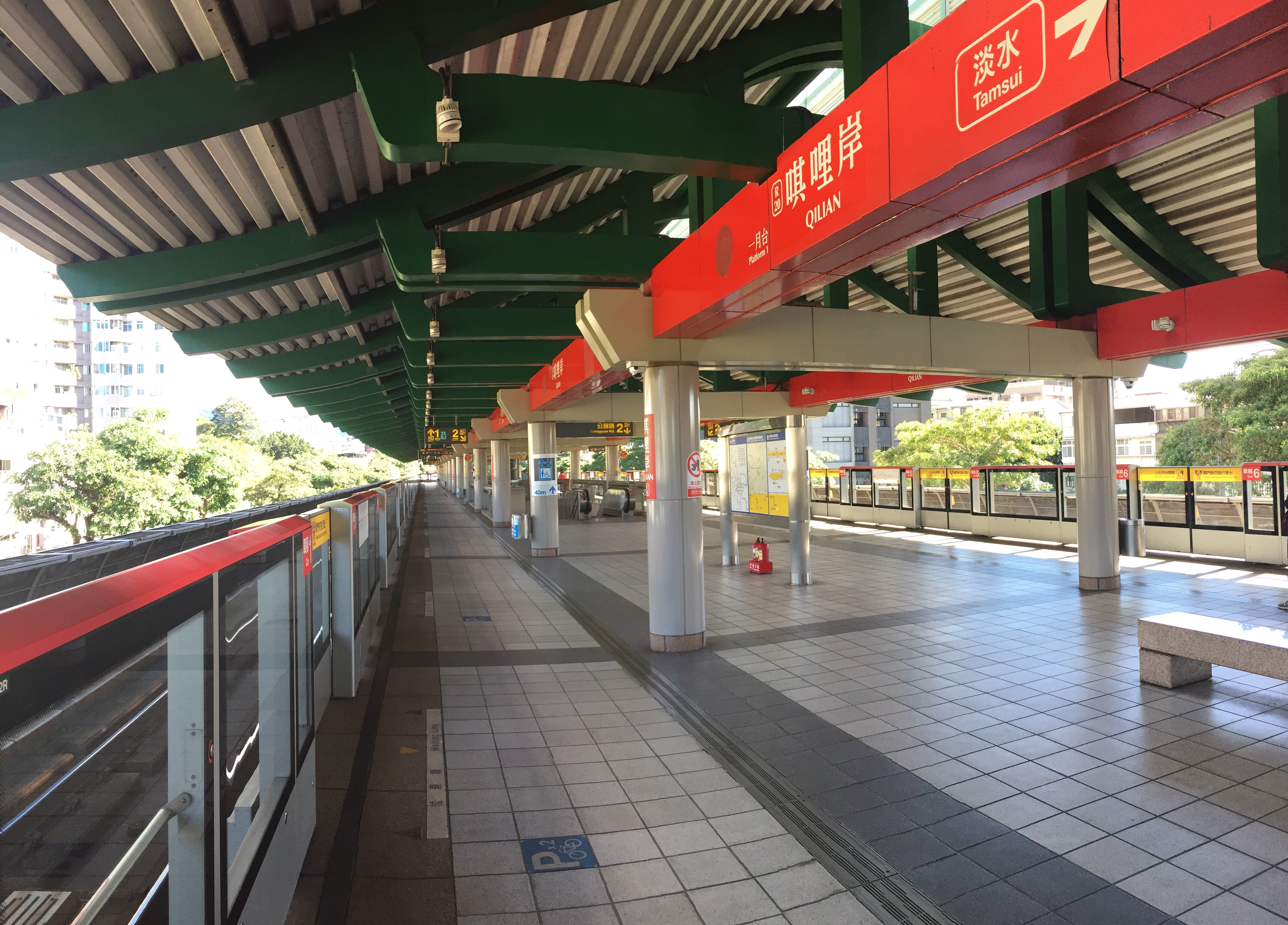
- Qili'an Station platform

Chinese name
- Chinese: 唭哩岸
Transcriptions
Standard Mandarin
- Hanyu Pinyin: Qīlǐ'àn
- Bopomofo: ㄑㄧ ㄌㄧˇ ㄢˋ
- Wade–Giles: Ch'i¹-li³ An⁴
Hakka
- Pha̍k-fa-sṳ: Khî-lî-ngan
Southern Min
- Hokkien POJ: Kî-lí-gān
- Tâi-lô: Kî-lí-gān

Ketagalan name
- Ketagalan: Ki-Irigan

General information
- Location: No. 301, Donghua Street Sec. 2 Beitou, Taipei; Taiwan
- Coordinates: 25.1209309°N 121.5062546°E
- Operator: Taipei Metro
- Line: Tamsui–Xinyi Line
- Connections: Bus stop

Construction
- Structure type: Elevated

Other information
- Station code: R20

History
- Opened: 28 March 1997

Passengers
- daily (December 2024)
- Rank: 92 out of 109

Services
Preceding station	Taipei Metro	Following station
Shipai towards Xiangshan or Daan	Tamsui–Xinyi Line	Qiyan towards Tamsui or Beitou
Location

The Taipei Metro Qilian station (which has a misleading romanization since its 2003 renaming from Chili An station) is located in the Beitou District of Taipei, Taiwan. It is a station on the Tamsui–Xinyi Line. In the past, the station belonged to the now-defunct TRA Tamsui line.

== Station overview ==
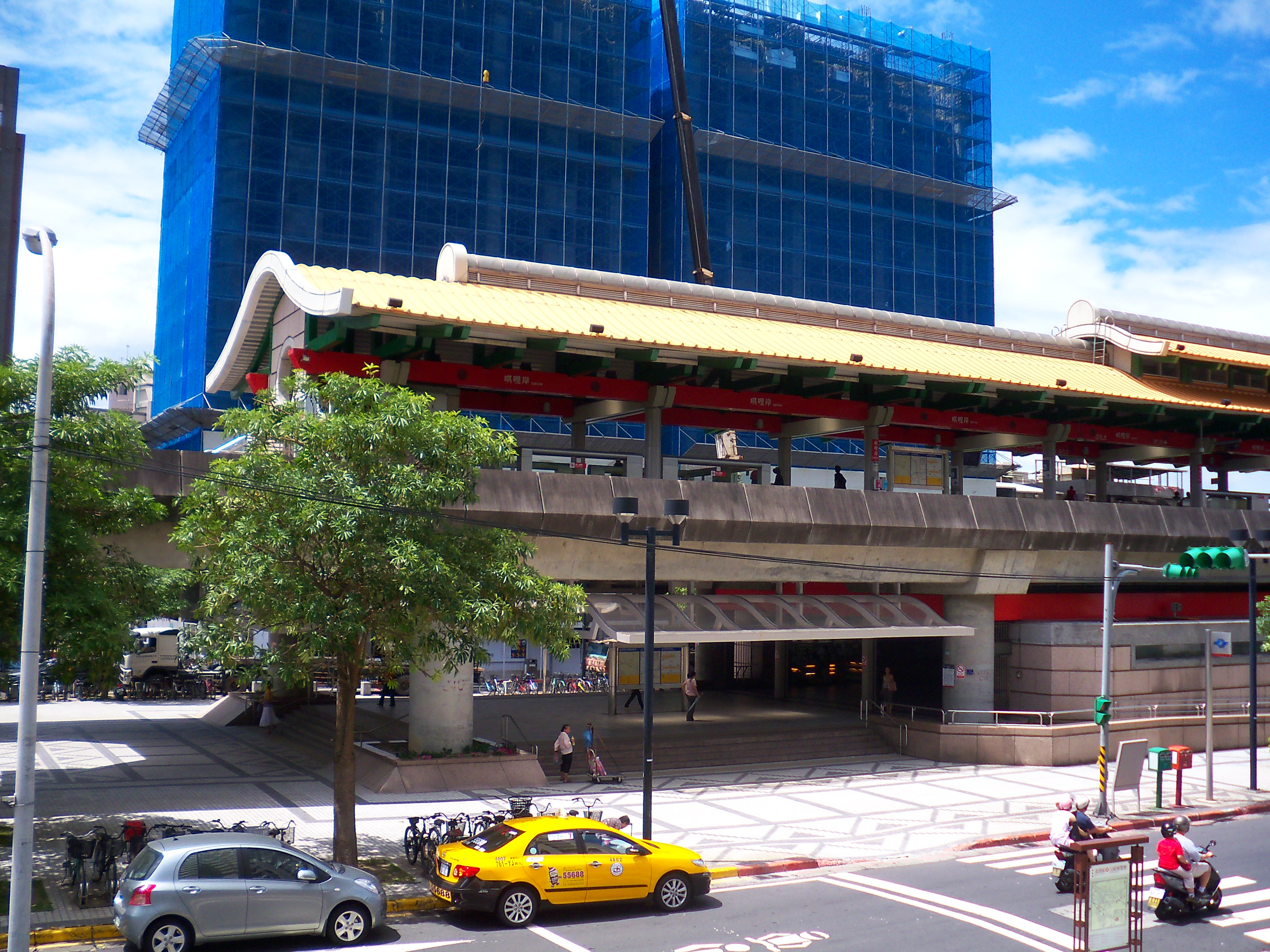
Qilian station exterior

This two-level, elevated station structure has one island platform and one exit. The station is situated between Donghua Street and Xian Street, near the entrance of Gongguan. The washrooms are inside the entrance area.

== History ==
This station was opened as Kirigan Station (Japanese: 唭里岸) on 17 August 1915 during the Japanese occupation of Taipei under the Tamsui Railroad Line, and was renamed "Shihpai" after the war. The old railway entrance was at Ziqiang Street, Lane 141. It was closed on 15 July 1988 and reopened as a metro station on 28 March 1997.

== Station layout ==
2F	Platform 1	← Tamsui–Xinyi line toward Tamsui / Beitou (R21 Qiyan)
2F	Island platform, doors will open on the left
2F	Platform 2	Tamsui–Xinyi line toward Xiangshan / Daan (R19 Shipai) →
Street level	Concourse	Entrance/exit, lobby, information desk, automatic ticket dispensing machines, one-way faregates, 7-Eleven; Restrooms
