= Xinbeitou Branch Line =

Metro line in Taipei, Taiwan

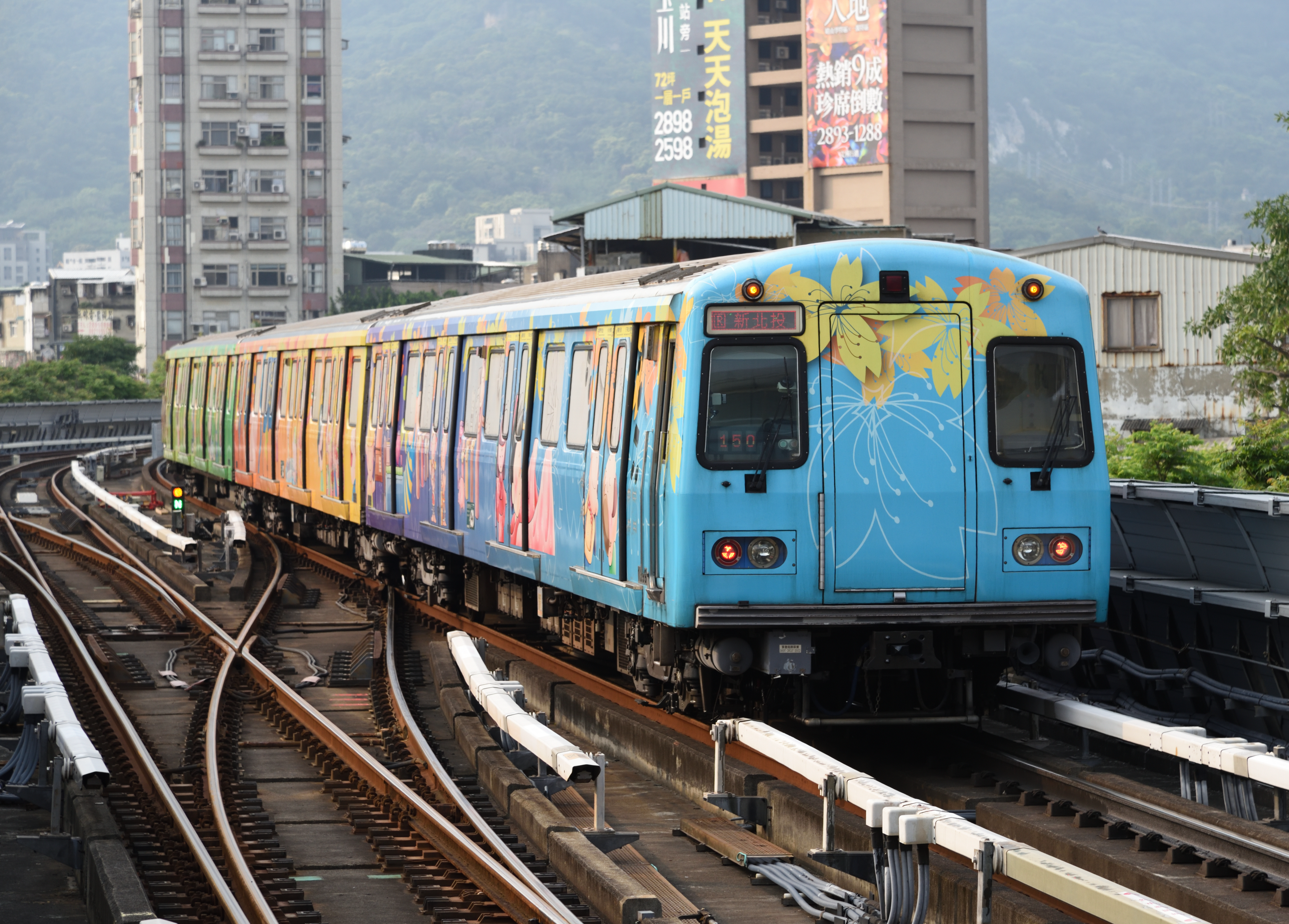
- A 3-car C371 train in the special livery (399) leaving Beitou. This train has been operating the line since 2009.

Overview
- Native name: 新北投支線
- Locale: Taipei, Taiwan
- Termini: Beitou; Xinbeitou
- Stations: 2
- Color on map: Light red

Service
- Type: Medium-capacity rail transit
- Operator: Taipei Rapid Transit Corporation
- Depot: Beitou
- Rolling stock: C371 (3-car)

History
- Opened: 28 March 1997; 29 years ago

Technical
- Line length: 1.2 km (0.7 mi)
- Num of tracks: 2
- Character: Elevated
- Track gauge: 1,435 mm (4 ft 8 1/2 in) standard gauge
- Electrification: 750 V DC third rail
- Operating speed: 25 km/h (16 mph)

Xinbeitou Branch Line
- Traditional Chinese: 新北投支線
- Simplified Chinese: 新北投支线
Transcriptions
Standard Mandarin
- Hanyu Pinyin: Xīnběitóu Zhīxiàn
- Bopomofo: ㄒㄧㄣ ㄅㄟˇ ㄊㄡˊ ㄓ ㄒㄧㄢˋ
- Wade–Giles: Hsin^{1}-pei^{3}-t'ou^{2} Chih^{1}-hsien^{4}
- Tongyong Pinyin: Sinběitóu Jhihsiàn
Hakka
- Pha̍k-fa-sṳ: Sîn-pet-thèu Kî-sien
Southern Min
- Hokkien POJ: Sin-pak-tâu Chi-soàⁿ

The Xinbeitou Branch Line (Chinese: 新北投支線; formerly transliterated as Hsin Peitou Branch Line until 2003) is a medium-capacity rapid transit branch line of the Tamsui–Xinyi Line on the Taipei Metro. It first opened for service on 28 March 1997. The line is 1.2 km (0.75 mi) long and consists of two stations.

== History ==
=== Heavy rail line ===
The Xinbeitou Branch Line traces back to a heavy rail line built by the Japan's rule over Taiwan. A spur from the pre-metro Tamsui line, the line's name was transliterated as the "Shinhokutō Line" in Japanese and "Hsin Peitou Line" in Chinese. Completed on 1 April 1916, the line was built specifically to transport visitors from the city to the newly-developed onsen facilities around Xinbeitou. The line was closed at the end of 1944 during World War II. After a change in power to the Kuomintang, the Xinbeitou Branch Line was reopened to passengers in 1946.

The line was served by single-car DR2100–DR2400 series diesel carriages that made round trips between Beitou and Xinbeitou stations. As Taipei's population grew, the branch transitioned from a touristic line to a commuter line, and was heavily used before its closure in 1988 for the reconstruction of the Beitou line into a rapid transit line (Tamsui–Xinyi Line). Before the line's closure, it was served by twenty-nine round trip services per day; each trip took around 90 seconds and cost NT$8. The daily ridership was around 22,000 passengers.

=== Metro line ===
Originally, the Xinbeitou Branch Line was to close permanently after the Tamsui line was converted into a rapid transit line. Xinbeitou residents successfully petitioned to the government for a branch line, arguing that it was an important transportation link for commuters. The branch line's groundbreaking ceremony was held on 30 December 1988, and on 28 March 1997, the new rapid transit line re-opened for service as part of the Taipei Metro. According to the original design, trains leaving downtown Taipei would terminate at either Xinbeitou or Tamsui station. Before the line's opening, Taipei Metro decided against this plan due to insufficient rolling stock.

=== Noise complaints ===
Since the line's opening, residents along the line have complained about noise from the trains due to the sharp curvature of the tracks and its close distance to apartment buildings on the sides. Rail grinding and the installation of noise barriers did not alleviate the noise by much. Shortly after opening, the train's frequency was reduced, the operating hours were shortened from 7 am to 9 pm, and the number of cars on each train was reduced from six to three.

On 14 September 2007, Taipei Metro extended its operating hours to between 6 am and midnight. It was hoped that if the noise standards were deemed to be at an acceptable level that the current Orange Line trains on the Red Line could operate on the Xinbeitou Line instead. Trains operate at a maximum headway of one per 7–8 minutes during peak hours.

It has been reported that the line is operating at a loss. A proposal was put forth in 2005 that a low-speed maglev train similar to the Linimo in Japan would solve the problem of noise pollution, but its feasibility on operating costs became a subject of ridicule.

In July 2019, the soundproofing walls on the line were updated as part of newly-introduced through-operations to central Taipei.

== Rolling stock ==
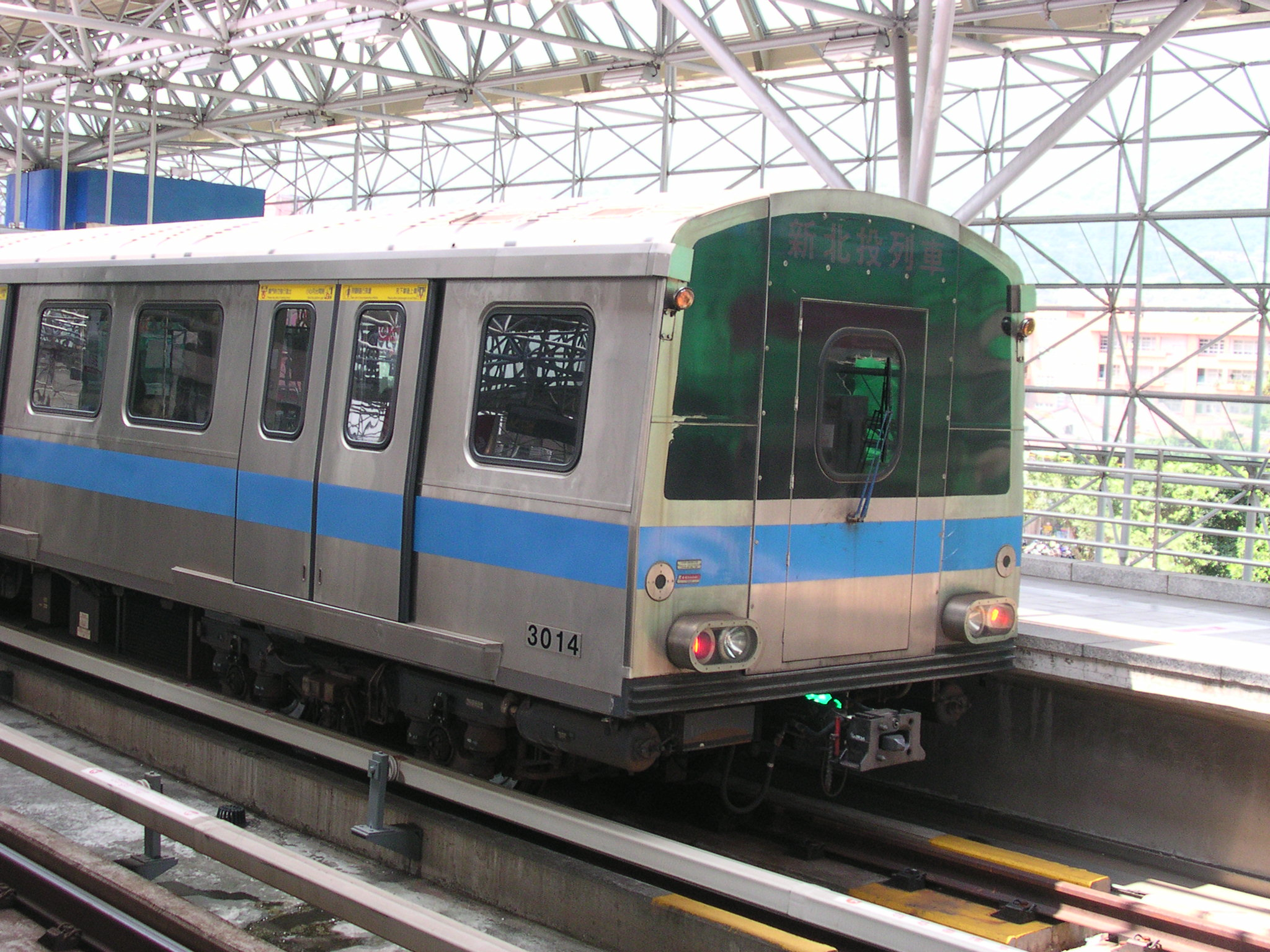
3-car C301 trains, which operated on the line until 2007

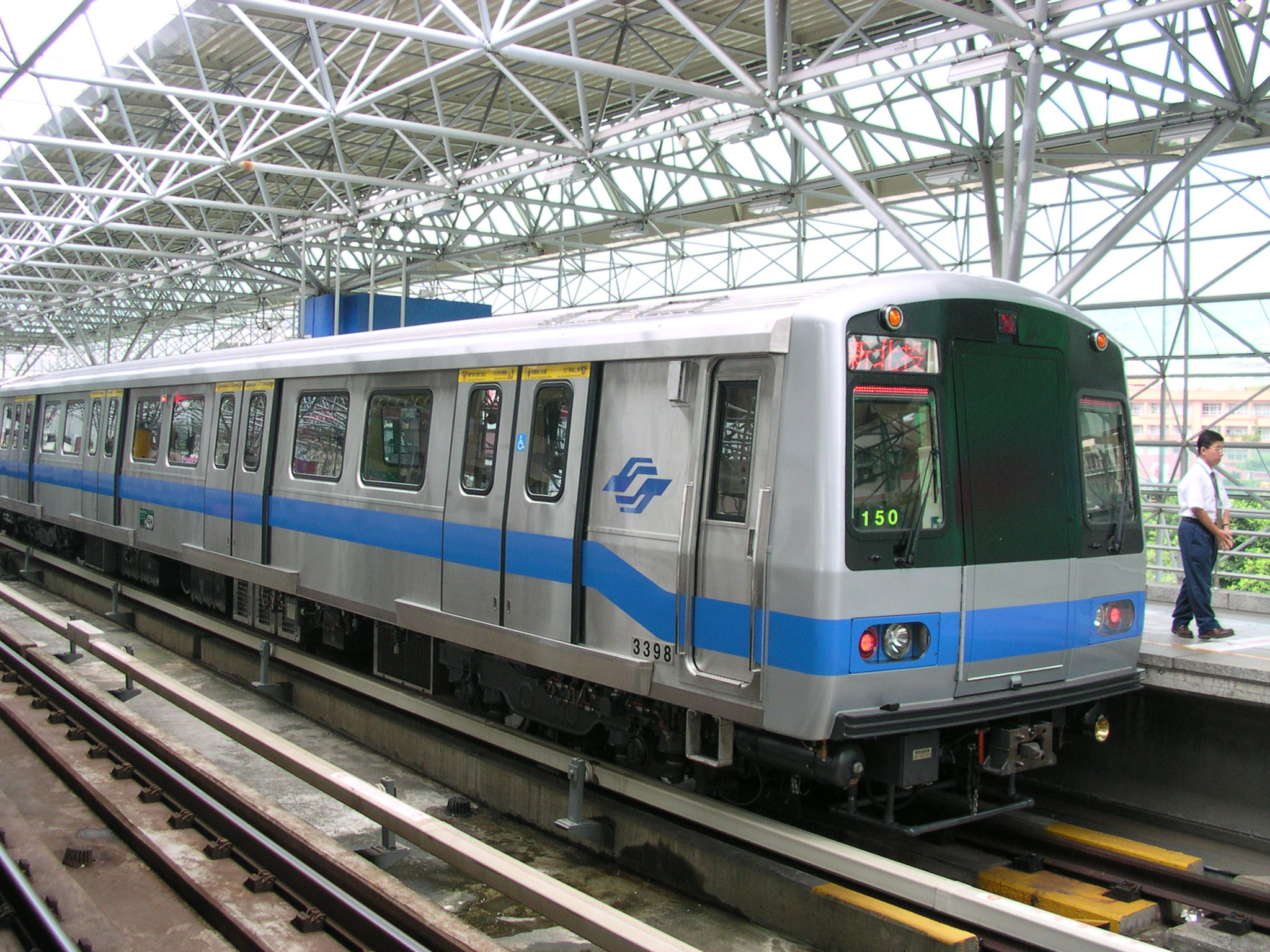
3-car C371 trains, which have operated on the line since 2007

A modified C301 (trainset 013/014) originally operated on the line in a 3-car formation, making it unique on the system. From 2007 onwards, the train was replaced by a purpose-built C371 of a similar length.

== Stations ==
Code	Station name	Station type		Locale		Sta. distance (km)		Opened date	Transfer
Code	Station name	Structure	Platform	Locale		Previous	Total	Opened date	Transfer
Xinbeitou Branch Line
R22	Beitou 北投	Elevated	Hybrid	Beitou	Taipei	—N/a	0.00	1997-3-28	Tamsui–Xinyi Line
R22A	Xinbeitou 新北投	Elevated	Island	Beitou	Taipei	1.03	1.03	1997-3-28	—N/a
