= Beitou metro station =

Taipei Metro Tamsui/Xinbeitou line interchange station

Coordinates: 25.131901°N 121.498597°E

Beitou 北投
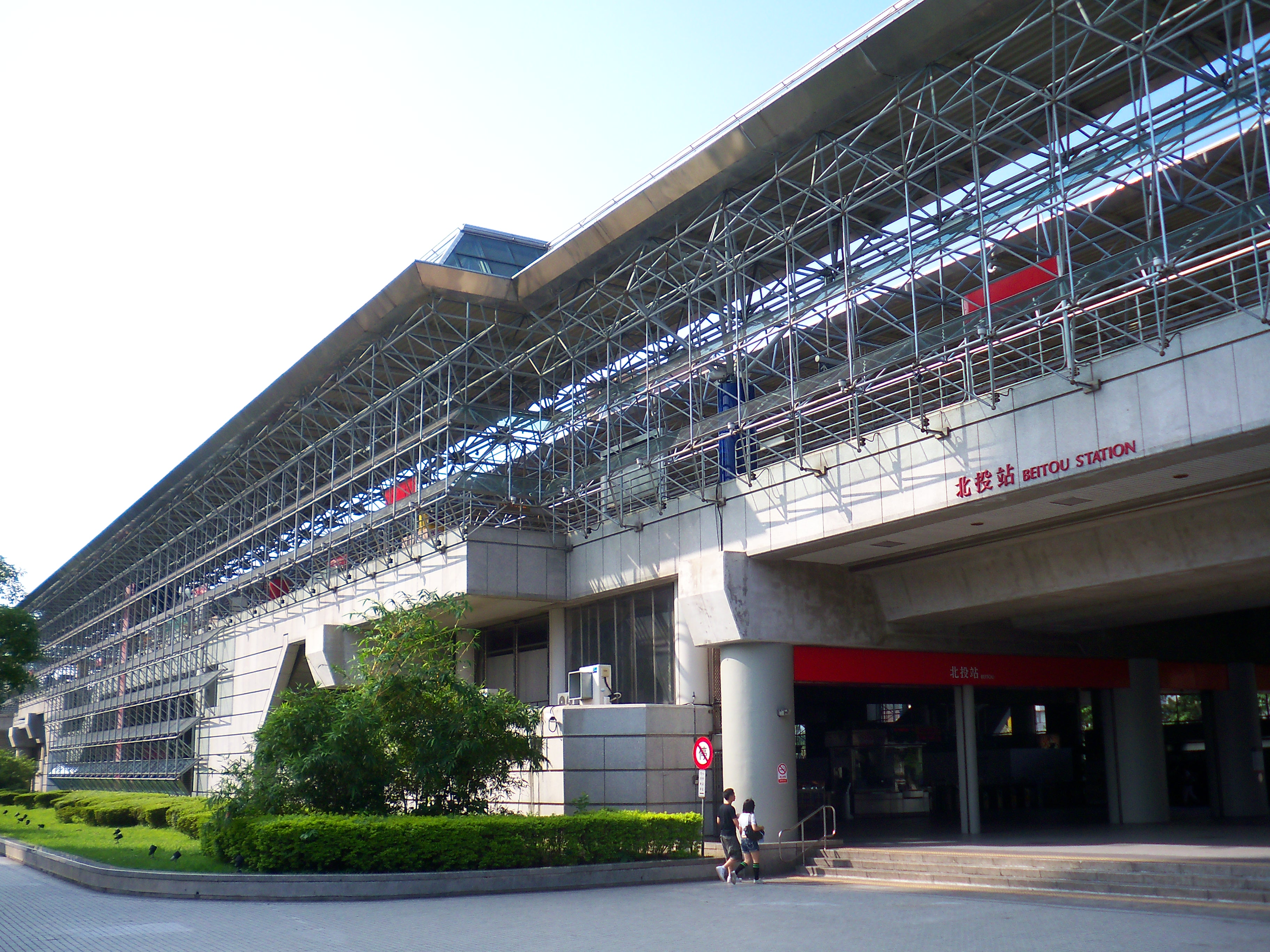
- Beitou station

General information
- Location: No. 1, Guangming Rd. Beitou, Taipei; Taiwan
- Operator: Taipei Metro
- Lines: Tamsui–Xinyi line; Xinbeitou branch line
- Platforms: 4
- Connections: Bus stop

Construction
- Structure type: Elevated

Other information
- Station code: R22

History
- Opened: 28 March 1997

Passengers
- daily (December 2024)
- Rank: 46 out of 109

Services
| Preceding station | Taipei Metro | Following station |
|---|---|---|
| Qiyan towards Guangci/Fengtian Temple | Tamsui–Xinyi line | Fuxinggang towards Tamsui |
| Qiyan towards Daan | Tamsui–Xinyi line | Terminus |
| Terminus | Xinbeitou branch line | Xinbeitou Terminus |
Location

Beitou metro station

Chinese name
- Chinese: 北投
Transcriptions
Standard Mandarin
- Hanyu Pinyin: Běitóu
- Bopomofo: ㄅㄟˇ ㄊㄡˊ
- Wade–Giles: Pei^{3}-t'ou^{2}
Hakka
- Pha̍k-fa-sṳ: Pet-thèu
Southern Min
- Tâi-lô: Pak-tâu

Japanese name
- Kanji: 北投駅
- Kana: ほくとうえき
Transcriptions
- Romanization: Hokutō Eki

Beitou station (Chinese: 北投站; formerly transliterated as Peitou station until 2003) is a metro station on the Tamsui–Xinyi line and Xinbeitou branch line of Taipei Metro, located in Beitou District, Taipei, Taiwan. Its location can be traced back the to same name station of the now-defunct TRA Tamsui line.

== Station overview ==
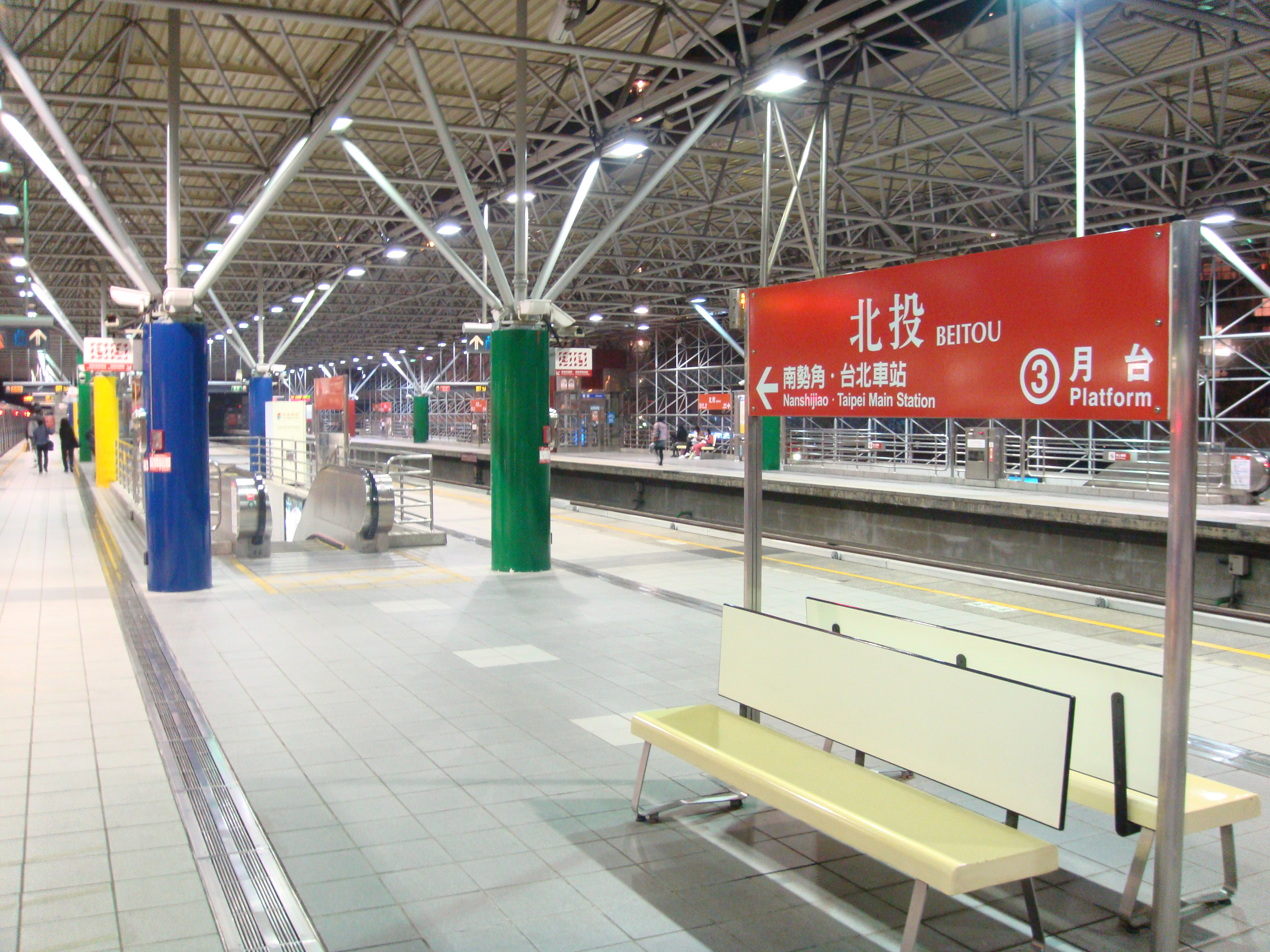
Beitou station platform level

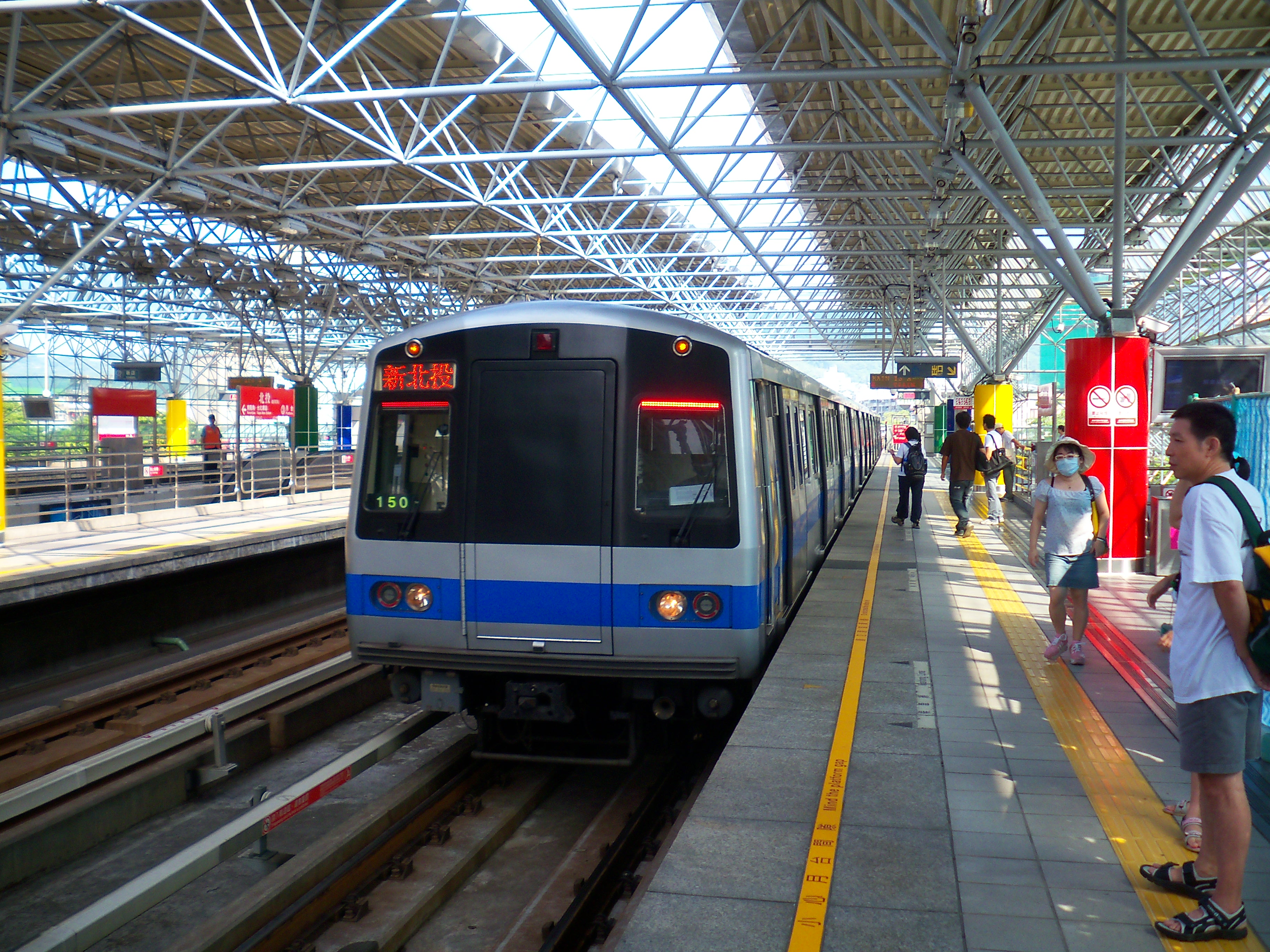
A Xinbeitou Branch Line train approaches on Platform 4.

This two-level, elevated station structure has one island platform and two side platforms. The washrooms are inside the entrance area. Nearby landmarks include Beitou Presbyterian Church and Beitou Market.

Just north of the station, there are crossovers between the Tamsui–Xinyi line and the Xinbeitou branch line, and between the tracks of each individual line, in both directions. Also to the north, the two Tamsui Line tracks cross over each other not at grade.

South of the station, the four tracks merge into two and cross over each other at a flying junction. There are crossovers to allow trains from Daan to terminate here.

== History ==
The TRA station at Beitou was opened on 25 October 1901 as Hokutō station (Japanese: 北投停車場), and another railway line, Shin-hokutō Railway line, was opened on 1 April 1916. On 15 July 1988, the service was discontinued in order to make way for the opening of the segment from Tamsui to Zhongshan for Taipei Metro on 28 March 1997.

From 1999 to 2012, trains from Nanshijiao terminated at Beitou Station platform 3 while construction work was conducted on the Zhonghe-Xinlu Line. From 2012 to 2013, trains from Taipower Building terminated here while the Tamsui-Xinyi line was still under construction. Trains travelling to Xindian from Tamsui from 1999 to 2014 stopped at platform 2 until the Songshan-Xindian line was opened.

== Station layout ==
| 2F | Side platform, doors will open on the left |
| 2F | Platform 4 | ← Xinbeitou branch line toward Xinbeitou (R22A Terminus) |
| 2F | Platform 3 | → Tamsui–Xinyi line toward Daan (R21 Qiyan) → |
| 2F | Island platform, doors will open on the left, right |
| 2F | Platform 2 | → Tamsui–Xinyi line toward Guangci/Fengtian Temple (R21 Qiyan) → |
| 2F | Platform 1 | ← Tamsui–Xinyi line toward Tamsui (R23 Fuxinggang) |
| 2F | Side platform, doors will open on the left |
| Street level | Concourse | Entrance/exit, lobby, information desk, automatic ticket dispensing machines, one-way faregates Restrooms |

== Around the station ==
- Lady Zhou's Memorial Gate
