= Tianmu, Shilin District =

Neighborhood in Shilin, Taipei, Taiwan

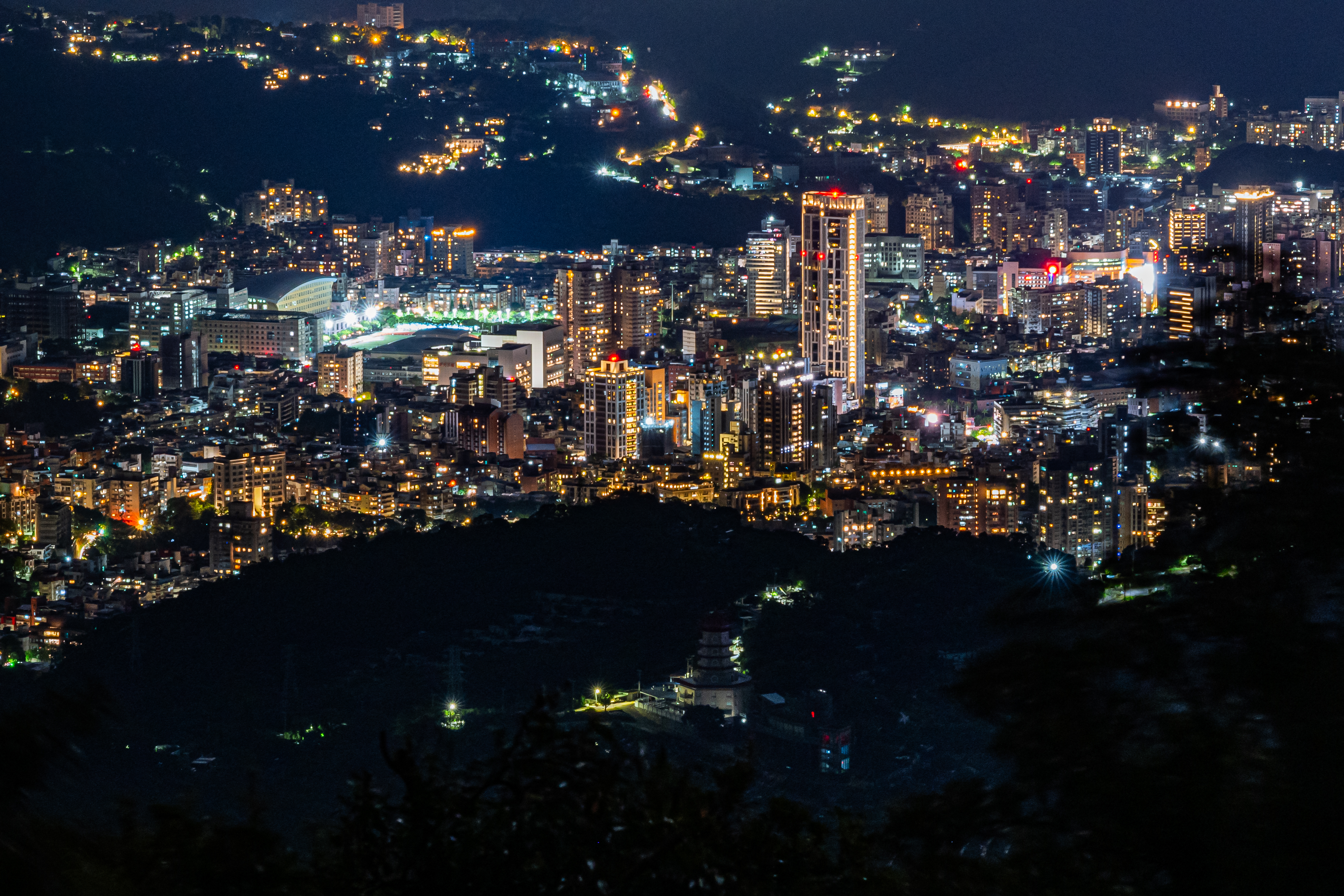
Tianmu night cityscape

Tianmu (Chinese: 天母; pinyin: Tiānmǔ) is a neighborhood located in Shilin District, Taipei, Taiwan. Located on the northern border of the district, Tianmu borders the neighboring district of Beitou and Yangmingshan National Park.

Tianmu is best known as an enclave for Taiwan's United States expatriate community. From the mid-1950s to 1979, before the US broke formal ties with Taiwan, large portions of the US Armed Forces serving under MAAG and their families stationed in Taiwan lived in Tianmu. Middle to lower ranking US servicemen resided within present-day Tianmu, while higher ranking officers resided in neighboring Yangmingshan. Other than military housing and recreation, significant portions of modern-day Tianmu were designated for housing developments created for USAID workers and foreign civilians. As of the 1980s relatively few of these Western style developments and buildings remain as they have been replaced by multistory apartment blocks. The road layout in Tianmu still aligns to the former Western style neighborhoods.

With the withdrawal of the US military in 1979, the Bank of Taiwan repurposed the former sites by leasing them to Taipei American School and Taipei Japanese School. With the further creation of Taipei European School, Tianmu has continued to attract foreign residents. In addition, several of the countries which retain diplomatic relationships with Taiwan have their foreign embassies and consulates located in Tianmu.

Tianmu is home to Taiwan's first branch of Mister Donut, a Shin Kong Mitsukoshi department store, a Sogo department store, and a Dayeh Takashimaya department store. There is also one movie theater, Wovie Cinema Tianmu. In addition, It also hosts a number of Western and Japanese restaurants, as well as specialty stores which cater to the expat community.

Tianmu Baseball Stadium, which replaces the old Taipei Municipal Baseball Stadium, is located in Tianmu. Right next to the baseball stadium is Tianmu Sports Park. The public facility has six tennis courts, a skating rink, a few children's playgrounds, an open-air theater, four basketball courts, a jogging track, a biking path, and a multipurpose lawn.

== Education ==
Elementary schools

- Taipei Municipal Tianmu Elementary School
- Taipei Municipal Shanyu Elementary School
- Taipei Municipal Shi-Dong Elementary School
- Taipei Municipal Lanya Elementary School
- Taipei Municipal Wenchang Elementary School
- Taipei Municipal Zhishan Elementary School
- Taipei Municipal Yu Nong Elementary School
- Taipei Municipal Yu Sheng Elementary School

Junior high schools

- Taipei Municipal Tian-Mu Junior High School
- Taipei Municipal Lanya Junior High School

University

- University of Taipei

Special education

- Taipei School for the Visually Impaired
- Taipei School of Special Education

Foreign Schools

- Taipei American School
- Taipei Japanese School
- Taipei European School

== Transportation ==
=== Roads ===
- ZhongShan North Road section 5 to 7
- FuGuo Road
- FuHua Road
- FuLin Bridge
- Zhong Cheng Road section 1 and 2
- DeXing East Road
- DeXing West Road
- KeQiang Road
- HuangXi Street
- ShiDong Road
- Tianmu East Road
- Tianmu West Road
- Tianmu North Road
- ShaMao Road
- TianYu Street
- DongShan Road
- ZhiYu Road section 1 and 2
- ZhongYi Street
- YuSheng Street
- ShuangXi Street
- ZhiCheng Road section 1 and 2
- XiaDongShi Industrial Road
- HouDong Industrial Road

=== MRT stations ===
Taipei Metro Tamsui–Xinyi Line:

- Shipai Station：Transfer Chongqing Express, Bus No. 224, 645, R12, R19 etc.
- Mingde Station：Transfer Bus No. 267 etc.
- Zhishan Station：Transfer Zhongshan Express, Dunhua Express, Bus No. 606, 616, 685 etc.

== Embassies and representative offices in Tianmu ==
There is a special embassy district in Tianmu where many embassies and representative offices are located.
25°7′0.39″N 121°31′28.26″E

- Belize Embassy
- Palau Embassy
- Marshall Islands Embassy
- Honduras Embassy
- Paraguay Embassy
- Haiti Embassy
- Eswatini Embassy
- Saint Vincent and the Grenadines Embassy
- Saudi Arabia Commercial Office
- Jordan Business Office
