= Shipai =

Shipai is the name of many places in China and Taiwan.

- Shipai, Dongguan, a town in Guangdong Province, China
- Shipai, Hunan, a place in Hunan Province, China
- Shipai, Hubei, a place in Hubei Province, China
- Shipai, Taipei, a place in Beitou District, Taipei, Taiwan
- Shipai, Yilan, a place in northern Taiwan on the boundary of New Taipei City and Yilan County

The following railway stations are named Shipai:

- Shipai railway station, Guangzhou, China
- Shipai metro station, Taipei, Taiwan
