= 100.8 FM =

FM radio frequency

The following radio stations broadcast on FM frequency 100.8 MHz:

== Spain ==
- Ibiza Global Radio

== China ==
- CNR The Voice of China in Fuxin
- Dongguan News Radio in Dongguan
- CNR Business Radio in Kaifeng

== Germany ==
- Bremen 4

== Taiwan ==
- International Community Radio Taipei in Chiayi, Yunlin County

== Ukraine ==
- Lviv Wave in Lviv Oblast

== United Kingdom ==
- Greatest Hits Radio Somerset in West Somerset
- Heart West in Dartmouth
- Smooth Lake District in Windermere
