= Chinese National Federation of Industries =

Chinese manufacturing organization

The Chinese National Federation of Industries (CNFI; Chinese: 中華民國全國工業總會; pinyin: Zhōnghuá Mínguó Quánguó Gōngyè Zǒng Huì), established in 1942 (known as the Chinese National Association of Industries before 1948), is a nonprofit organization composed of about 150 member associations in the manufacturing in the Republic of China (Taiwan). Each member association represents their respective field of manufacturing industry. More than 100,000 industrial companies in Taiwan are represented by their associations. The CNFI serves as a forum for views and opinions of the country’s industrial sector that has been aiming at upgrading and promoting the economic development of Taiwan.

== See also ==
- Taiwan External Trade Development Council
- American Chamber of Commerce in Taipei
