= Zhishan =

Zhishan may refer to:

- Zhishan metro station, a metro station of the Taipei Metro
- Zhishan Village (至善里), a village in Zhongli District, Taoyuan City, Taiwan
- Wang Zhishan (王志善), a Chinese actor portrayed as Wuqu in 1986 Chinese television series Journey to the West.
- Zhu Yunming (1461–1527), whose art name Zhishan (枝山), a Chinese calligrapher, poet, writer
