= Chih Shan Yen Hui Chi Temple =

Temple in Shilin, Taipei, Taiwan

- 芝山巖惠濟宮
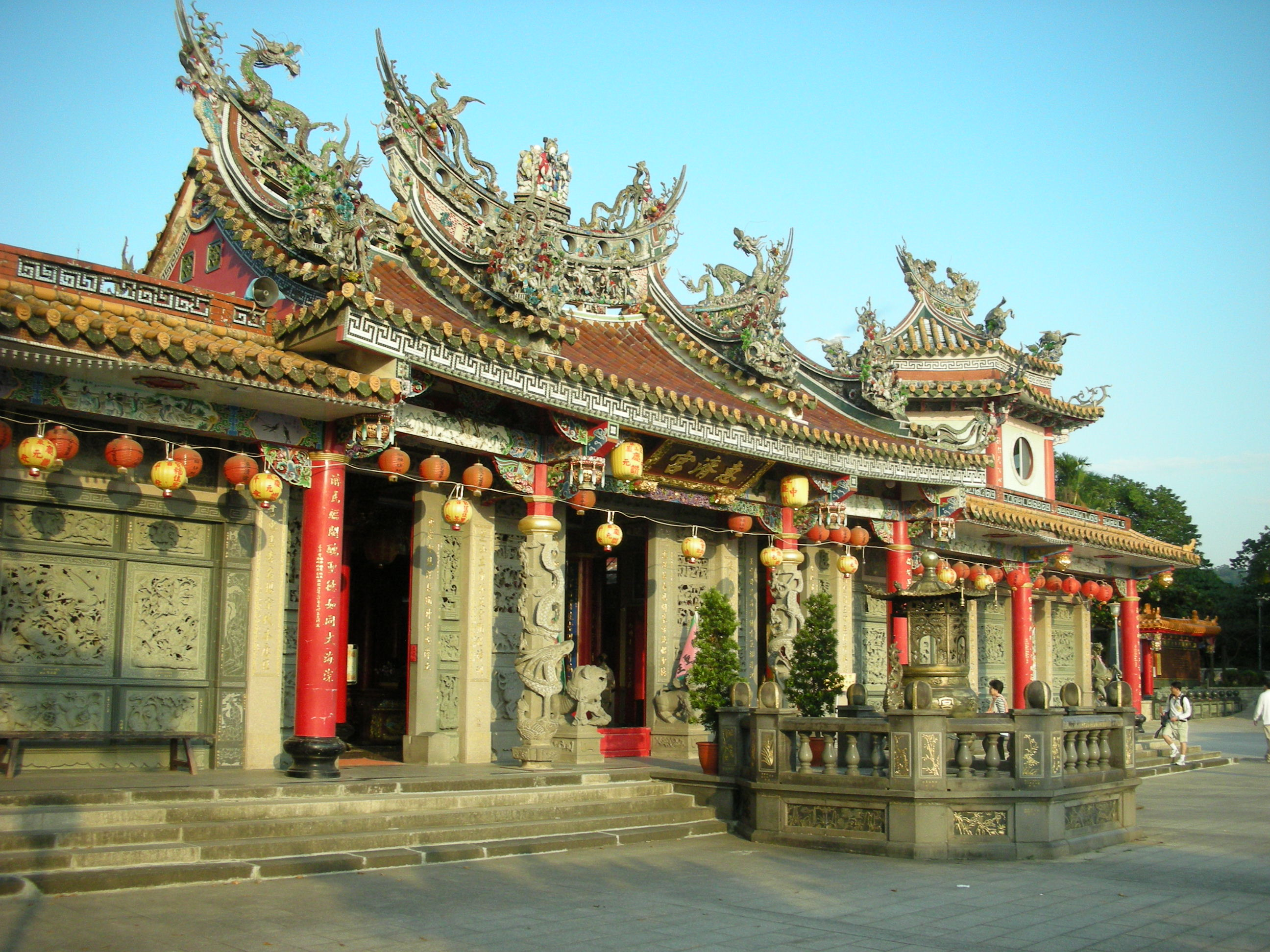

- Location within Taiwan

Religion
- Affiliation: Taoism

Location
- Location: Shilin, Taipei, Taiwan
- Interactive map of Chih Shan Yen Hui Chi Temple
- Coordinates: 25°6′11.3″N 121°31′50.8″E

Architecture
- Type: temple
- Completed: 1764

The Chih Shan Yen Hui Chi Temple (traditional Chinese: 芝山巖惠濟宮; simplified Chinese: 芝山岩惠济宫; pinyin: Zhīshānyán Huìjì Gōng) is a temple in Shilin District, Taipei, Taiwan.

== History ==
The temple was constructed in 1752–1764. Afterwards, it has been rebuilt five times until its current structure stands since 1968. The Lin Shuangwen rebellion broke out in 1786–1788 to fight against the Qing Dynasty by attacking Chi Shan Yen. It resulted the death of many Shilin people near the temple. A table was then erected at the temple to commemorate of the incident.

== Architecture ==
The temple is built with concrete decorated with stone sculpture. The front hall is dedicated to Three Sovereigns and Five Emperors, Kai Zhang Sheng Wang, the upper floor is dedicated to Wenchang Wang and the lower hall is dedicated to Avalokiteśvara.

== Transportation ==
The temple is accessible within walking distance east of Zhishan Station of Taipei Metro.

== See also ==
- Chih Shan Yen Gate
- Shilin Shennong Temple, Shilin District
- Shengwang Temple, Changhua County
- Yong'an Temple, Yunlin County
- List of temples in Taiwan
- List of tourist attractions in Taiwan
