= Shuangxi Park and Chinese Garden =

Park and garden in Shilin, Taipei, Taiwan

- 雙溪公園
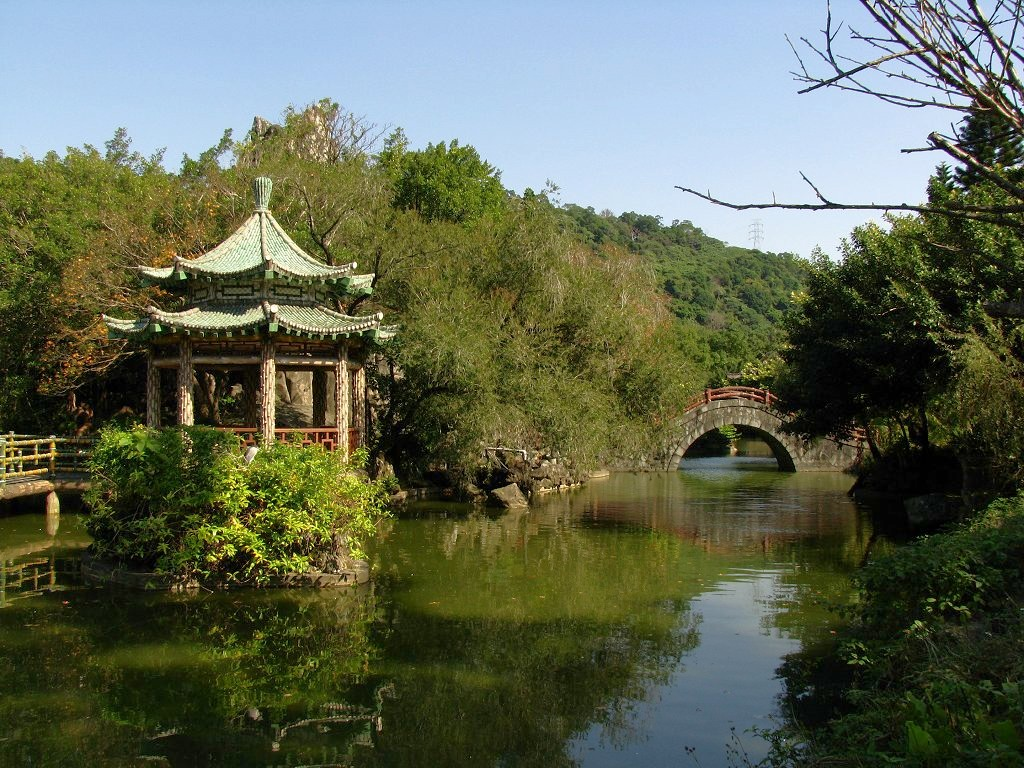
- Interactive map of Shuangxi Park and Chinese Garden
- Type: Garden
- Location: Shilin, Taipei, Taiwan
- Coordinates: 25°5′52.9″N 121°32′5.58″E
- Area: 2 hectares (4.9 acres)
- Established: 1974

The Shuangxi Park and Chinese Garden (Chinese: 雙溪公園; pinyin: Shuāngxī Gōngyuán) is a park and garden located in Shilin District, Taipei, Taiwan, on Zhishan Road. The total area of the park is 2 hectares. It was built in 1974, and features southern Chinese courtyard style architecture. It contains pavilions, courtyards, arch bridges, zig-zag bridges, and corridors. The landscape layout and construction was completed by Hu Guoli (胡國禮)

== Features ==
=== Stone Lion ===
It is a Chinese belief that the lion is the animal representing authority and fealty. Thus, the cloudy-grained marble stone lions at the gates of the Chinese Garden – typically Chinese in style – guarding the main gates of the Garden. They are skillfully sculptured from Taiwanese Marble.

=== Pavilion ===
The Chinese Pavilion, Plateau and Tower represent the soul of the Chinese gardening art. The artistic features, typical of Chinese architecture have long been appreciated by man. The arrangement of these structures is very important and one of the essential rules of the structural arrangement is that the position of each structure must be balanced by its height and size according to Fengshui. Further, the building must be linked with plants, rocks, a winding stream and footpaths so as to create a poetical scene. The design of the pavilions at the Shuangxi Garden is based on the style of Southern Chinese Pavilions, and decorated to blend harmoniously with the Garden.

== Transportation ==
The area is accessible within walking distance east of Zhishan Station of Taipei Metro.

== See also ==
- Chinese garden
- Zhishan Garden
