= Children's Art Museum in Taipei =

Museum in Shilin, Taipei, Taiwan

- 蘇荷兒童美術館
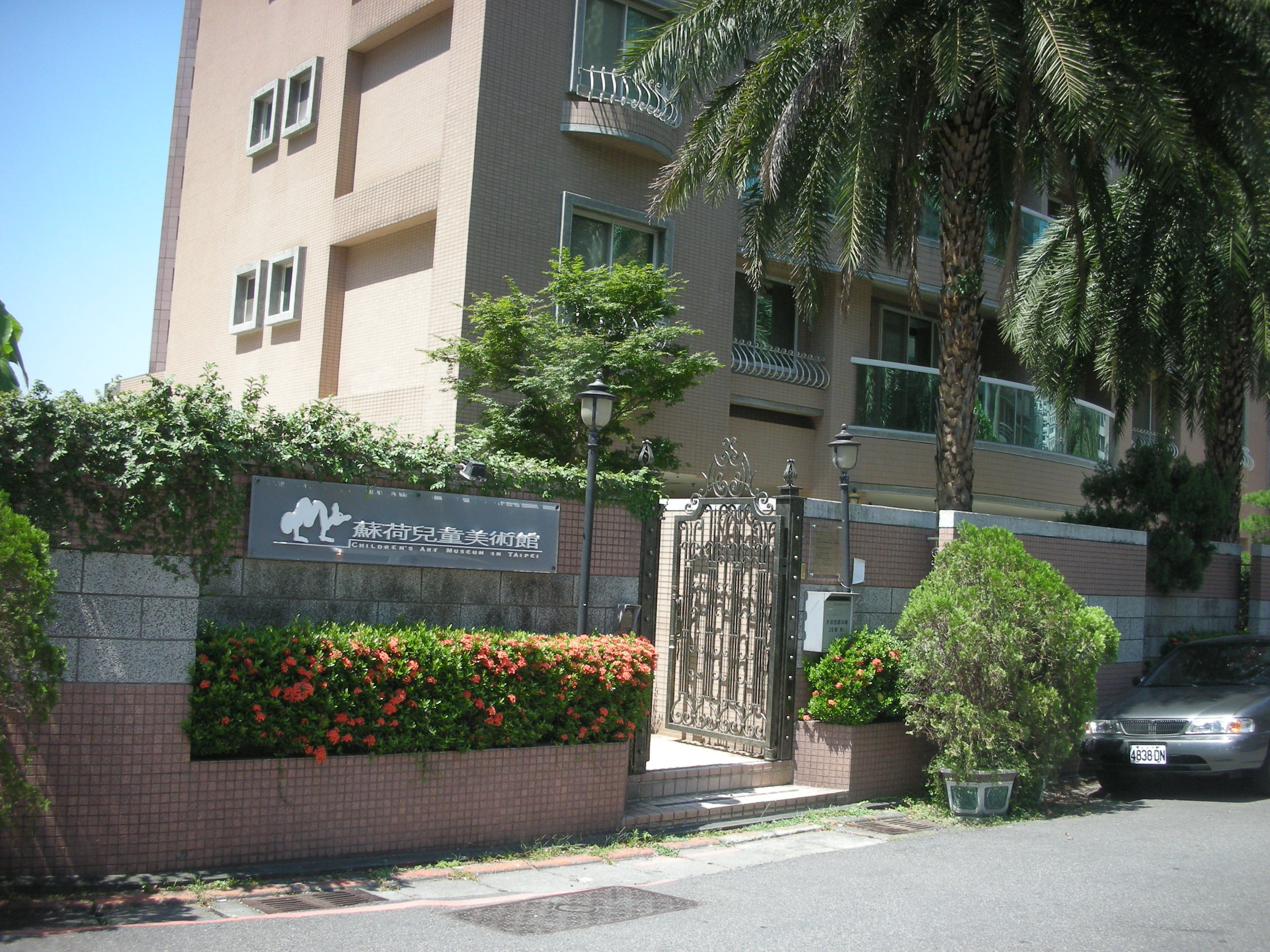
- Established: 2003
- Location: Shilin, Taipei, Taiwan
- Coordinates: 25°07′04″N 121°31′28″E
- Type: museum
- Founding Director: Lin Chien-ling
- Website: Official website

The Children's Art Museum in Taipei (traditional Chinese: 蘇荷兒童美術館; simplified Chinese: 苏荷儿童美术馆; pinyin: Sūhé Értóng Měishùguǎn) is a museum in Shilin District, Taipei, Taiwan. The museum was established to promote art education for children, parents, teachers and the general public.

== History ==
The museum was established in 2003.

== Exhibitions ==
The museum has the following exhibition areas:

- Camel Exhibition
- Oasis Exhibition Area
- Art Tunnel Area
- Magic Room

== Transportation ==
The museum is accessible within walking distance northeast from Shipai Station of the Taipei Metro.

== See also ==
- List of museums in Taiwan
