= National Research Institute of Chinese Medicine =

Research center in Beitou, Taipei, Taiwan

Coordinates: 25.1200°N 121.5144°E

- 國家中醫藥研究所
- Logo of the National Research Institute of Chinese Medicine

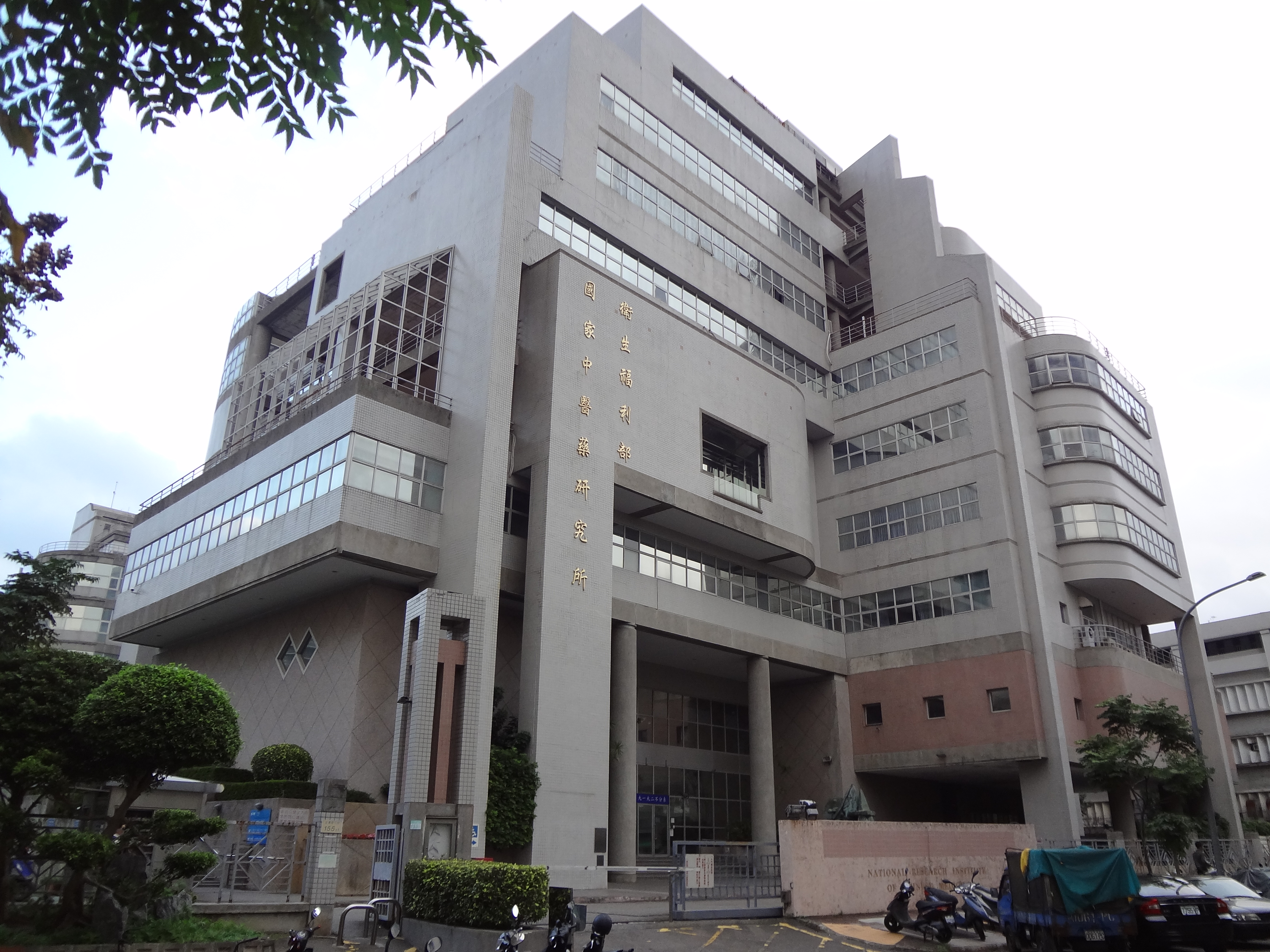
- Headquarters of National Research Institute of Chinese Medicine

Agency overview
- Type: research institute
- Headquarters: Beitou, Taipei, Taiwan
- Agency executive: Su Yi-Chang, Director
- Parent agency: Ministry of Health and Welfare
- Website: www.nricm.edu.tw

The National Research Institute of Chinese Medicine (NRICM; Chinese: 國家中醫藥研究所 (previously: 國立中國醫藥研究所); pinyin: Guójiā Zhōng Yīyào Yánjiū Suǒ (previously: Guólì Zhōngguó Yīyào Yánjiū Suǒ); previously: National Institute of Chinese Medicine) is a research center responsible for research, experimental and development issues of Chinese medicine. It is located in the Beitou District, Taipei, Taiwan and run under the guidance of the Ministry of Education of the Republic of China. It is Taiwan's largest Chinese herbal medicine research center.

== History ==
In March 1956, the Executive Yuan passed the Chinese Medicine Educational Law Bill to set up a Chinese medicine school and establish a research organization. In 1957, the preparatory office of the Chinese Medicine Research Institute was established in Taipei. The National Research Institute of Chinese Medicine was finally established formally on 22 October 1963 under Department of Health. On 23 July 2013, the institute was placed under the Ministry of Education.

== Directors ==
1. Li, Huan-shen (1963-1979)
2. Liu, Guo-zhu (1979-1988)
3. Chen, Chieh-fu (1988-2004)
4. Wu, Tsung-neng (2004)
5. Wu, Tian-shung (2004-2007)
6. Lee, Te-chang (2007-2009)
7. Huang, Yi-tsau (2009-2016)
8. Guh, Jih-Hwa (2016-2018)
9. Chang, Fang-Rong (2018-2020)
10. Su, Yi-Chang (2020-)

== Transportation ==
The research center is accessible within walking distance north of Shipai Station of Taipei Metro.

== See also ==
- Healthcare in Taiwan
