= Zhishan metro station =

Metro station in Taipei, Taiwan

Zhishan 芝山
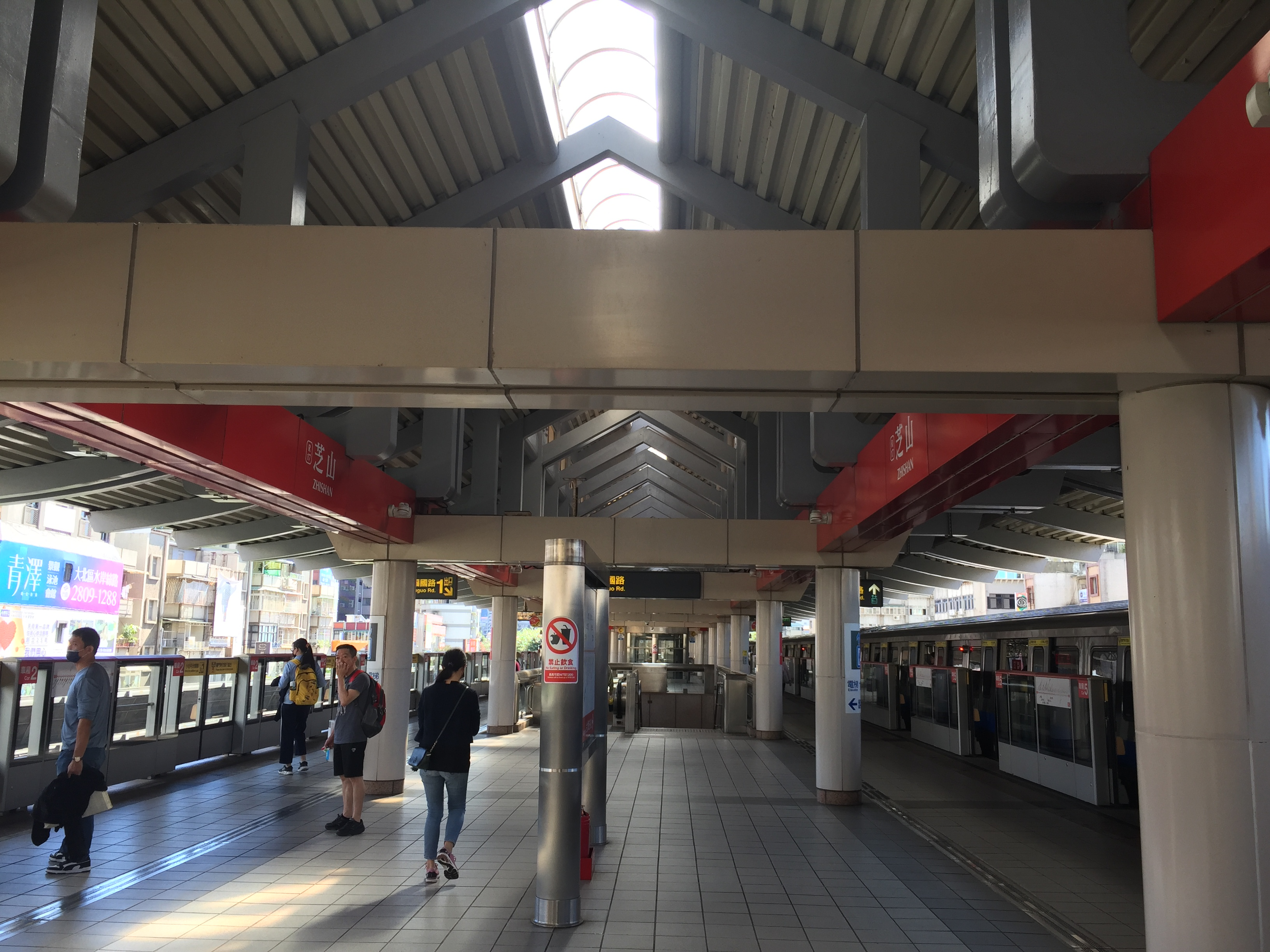
- Platform

Chinese name
- Chinese: 芝山
Transcriptions
Standard Mandarin
- Hanyu Pinyin: Zhīshān
- Bopomofo: ㄓ ㄕㄢ
- Wade–Giles: Chih¹-shan¹
Hakka
- Pha̍k-fa-sṳ: Chṳ̂-sân
Southern Min
- Tâi-lô: Tsi-san

General information
- Location: 70 Fuguo Rd; Shilin District, Taipei; Taiwan
- Coordinates: 25.1031°N 121.5225°E
- System: Taipei Metro station
- Operator: Taipei Metro
- Line: Tamsui–Xinyi Line

Construction
- Structure type: Elevated
- Cycle facilities: Access available

Other information
- Station code: R17
- Website: web.metro.taipei/e/stationdetail2010.asp?ID=R17-059

History
- Opened: 1997-03-28

Passengers
- 2017: 16.505 million per year ▼0.27%
- Rank: (Ranked 39 of 119)

Services
Preceding station	Taipei Metro	Following station
Shilin towards Xiangshan or Daan	Tamsui–Xinyi Line	Mingde towards Tamsui or Beitou
Location

Zhishan (Chinese: 芝山; pinyin: Zhīshān, formerly transliterated as Chihshan station until 2003) is a metro station in Taipei, Taiwan served by Taipei Metro. It is a station on the Tamsui–Xinyi line. It is a planned transfer station on the Shezi Light Rail line.

== Station overview ==
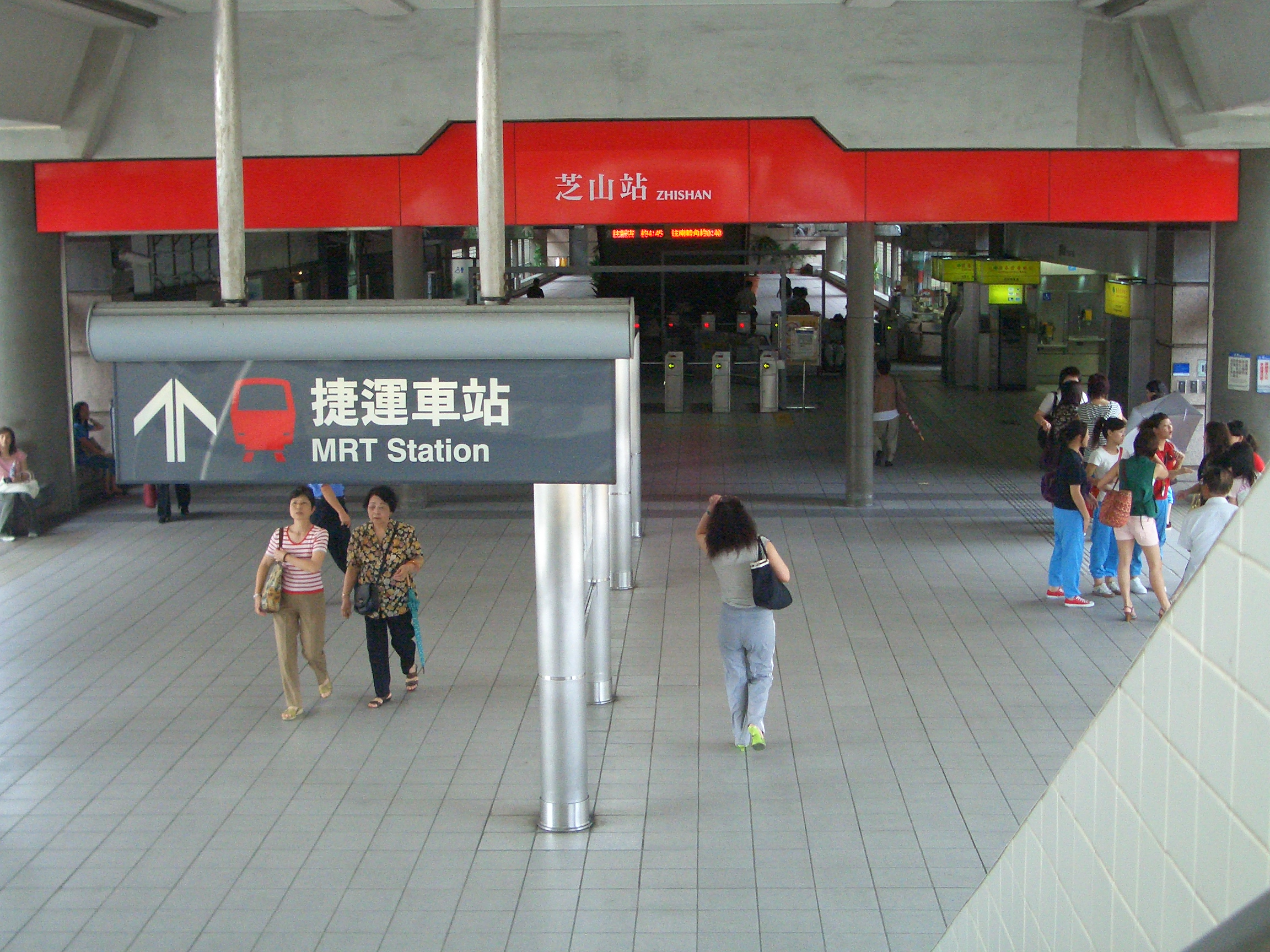
Zhishan station exit 1

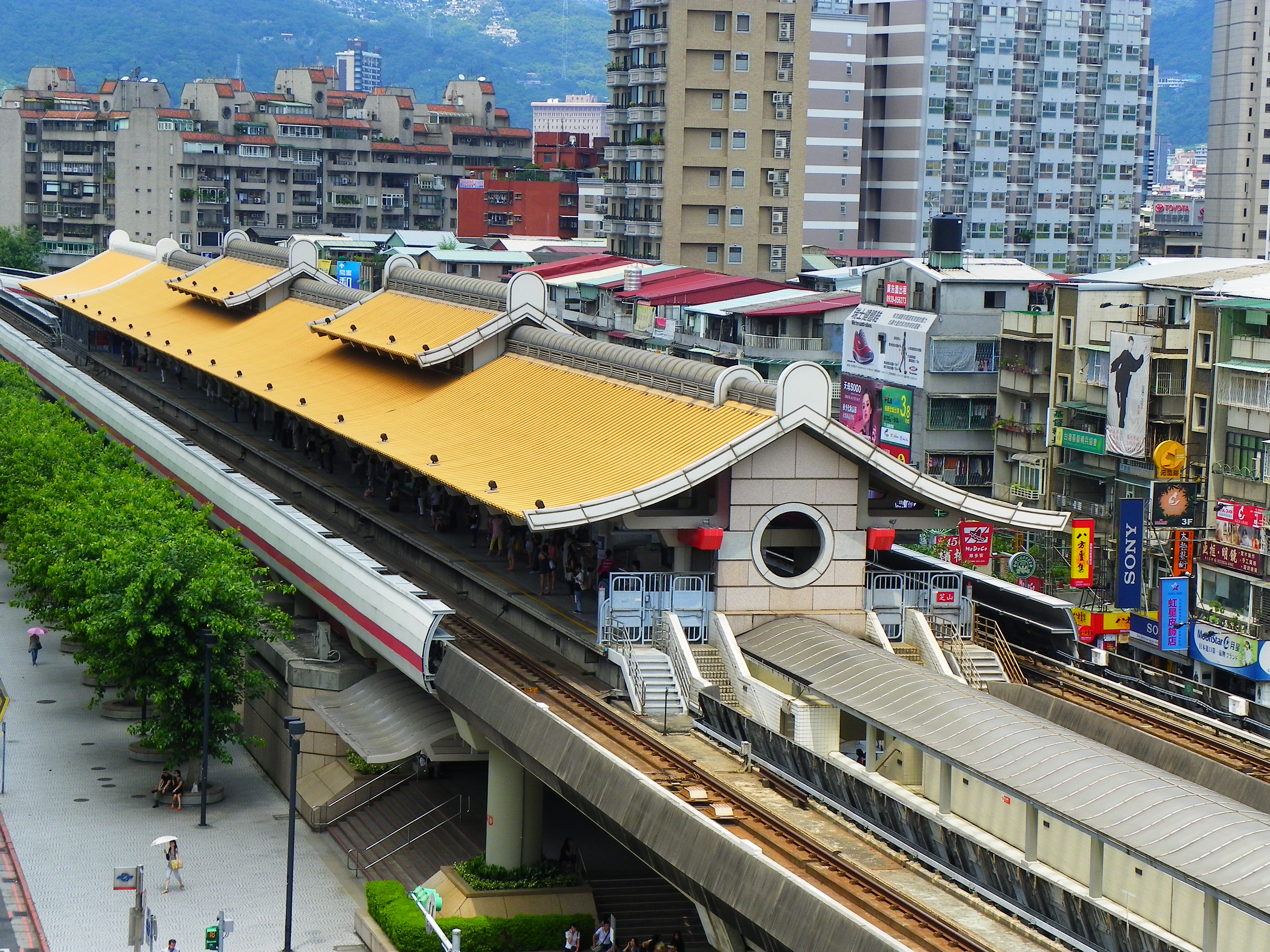
Zhishan station exterior

The two-level, elevated station structure has one island platform and two exits. It is situated on Fuhua Road, near Fuguo Road entrance. The washrooms are inside the entrance area.

Nearby are the Chih Shan Yen Gate, Chih Shan Yen Hui Chi Temple, Shuangxi Park and Chinese Garden, The Xiqu Center of Taiwan, Taipei American School, SOGO and Carrefour branches.

=== History ===
This station was opened on 28 March 1997. Originally there was only one exit, at Fuguo Road. On 20 November 2010, a second exit facing Dexing West Road (exit 2) opened for use.

== Station layout ==
2F	Platform 1	← Tamsui–Xinyi line toward Tamsui / Beitou (R18 Mingde)
2F	Island platform, doors will open on the left
2F	Platform 2	→ Tamsui–Xinyi line toward Xiangshan / Daan (R16 Shilin) →
Street level	Concourse	Entrance/exit, lobby, information desk, automatic ticket dispensing machines, one-way faregates Restrooms

== First and last train timings ==
The first and last train timings at Daan Park station are as follows:

Destination	First train		Last train
Destination	Mon − Fri	Sat − Sun and P.H.	Daily
Tamsui–Xinyi line
R28 Tamsui	06:04	06:04	00:50
R01Guangci/Fengtian Palace Station	06:03	06:03	00:42

== Nearby landmarks ==
- Tianmu Area

Historical / sports

- Chih Shan Yen Gate
- Tianmu Baseball Stadium

Schools

- Taipei American School
- Taipei Japanese School
- University of Taipei

Shopping centers and cinemas

- Dayeh Takashimaya
- Shin Kong Mitsukoshi Tianmu Branch
- Wovie Cinemas
- Fareastern SOGO department store Tianmu branch
