= English-language radio =

English-language radio refers to radio stations that broadcast primarily in the English language and are located in countries where English is not an official language or majority language. Often referred to as "English-speaking radio" or "Expat radio" the broadcasts enables expats, vacationers and travelers to listen to radio in their native language while traveling abroad. The idea is that stations broadcast in English to popular holiday destinations such as Pattaya, the French Riviera, the Costa del Sol or places with high expat communities. English language broadcasting also takes the form of military-backed radio such as the American Forces Network. However English-language radio based in foreign countries has to now compete with the introduction of internet radio and satellite technology that has increased listener's access to English-language radio based in "home" counties.

== History ==
The first English-language radio in a foreign country transmission was thought to be in 1925 when Radio Paris broadcast from the Eiffel Tower, a show about fashion design, sponsored by Selfridges of London.

With end of World War II American and British forces began occupation of bases within regions of conquered Axis countries such as Germany and Okinawa for the enjoyment and informative power radio bring to both the troops and their families. Today traditions remain as the American Forces Network and the British Forces Broadcasting Service continue to provide English-language entertainment and information to troops stationed abroad in their respective countries or areas.

Non-military English broadcasting gained momentum with the increase in globalization after World War II. As English-speaking business personnel and expat communities grew because of international trade and investment, so did the demand for English language entertainment. As the number of global English speakers has grown, demand from the local native market has grown as well. Stations that actively reach out to the local community such as International Community Radio Taipei have been on the rise.

== Location ==
The location of most English-language radio stations can be determined by their proximity to large populations of English speakers. Geneva, Switzerland, for example, has many English speakers and expatriates, also the Spanish coastal areas, and thus English radio broadcasts. Radio stations in places such as Baja California and Costa Rica also serve the increasing number of English speakers.

== Notable English-language radio stations ==
- Ace FM Community radio exclusive the inland areas of Malaga, Spain
- Armed Forces Network
- BBC World Service
- British Forces Broadcasting Service
- Chilli FM The hottest English-speaking radio station, broadcasting from Marbella to over 150 km along Spain's Costa del Sol, utilising an array of ultra-powerful FM transmitters to ensure uninterrupted regional coverage.
- Coastline FM Spain's "original" Coastline FM, longest established English radio station covering Costa del Sol on 97.6FM, and broadcasting on the internet, live and local, a lively mix of hits from the past 50 years and today
- Energy FM Broadcasting "Pure Dance" around the clock on 92.1fm from the Canary islands and worldwide on-line
- Heart FM Spain 88.2, the inland radio station for Andalucia and beyond
- International Community Radio Taipei
- Riviera Radio, Monaco
- XETRA-FM

== See also ==
- International radio broadcasters
