= Chih Shan Yen Gate =

Gate in Shilin, Taipei, Taiwan

- 芝山岩隘門
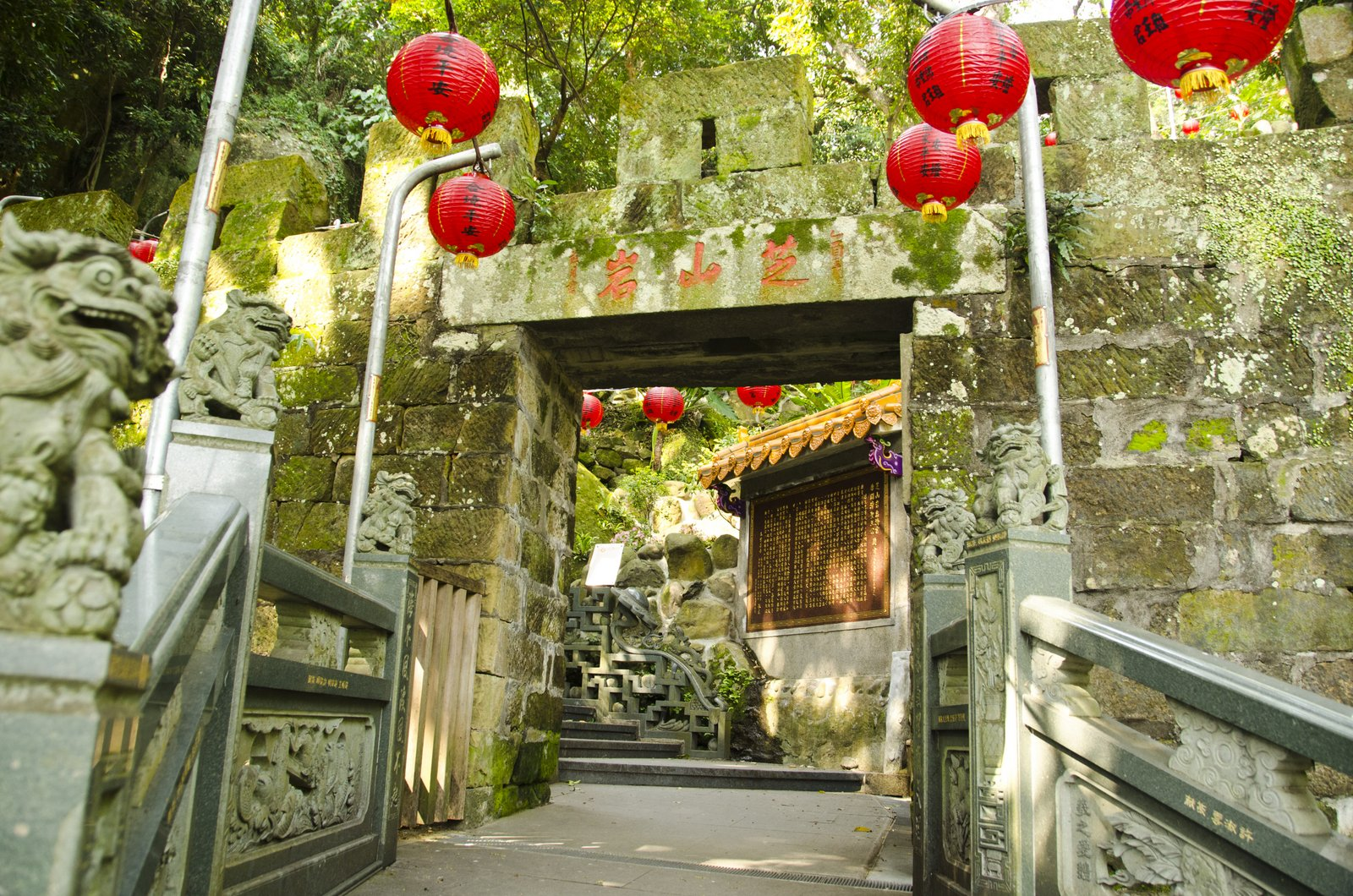
- Interactive map of the Chih Shan Yen Gate area

General information
- Type: gate
- Location: Shilin, Taipei, Taiwan
- Coordinates: 25°6′11.1″N 121°31′48.9″E
- Completed: 1825

The Chih Shan Yen Gate (traditional Chinese: 芝山岩隘門; simplified Chinese: 芝山岩隘门; pinyin: Zhīshānshí Àimén) is a gate in Shilin District, Taipei, Taiwan.

== History ==
The gate was built in 1825 by Zhangzhou immigrants from Fujian as a defense during conflict with Quanzhou immigrants.

== Architecture ==
The gate is made of quarry stone. The top of the gate was crenelated with loopholes for firing weapons. There are four Chinese characters carved on the rock outside the gate by Qing Dynasty scholar Pan Yongqing depicting the beauty of Chih Shan Yen Hui Chi Temple.

== Transportation ==
The temple is accessible within walking distance east of Zhishan Station of Taipei Metro.

== See also ==
- List of tourist attractions in Taiwan
