= Shilin Shennong Temple =

Temple in Shilin, Taipei, Taiwan

- 士林神農宮
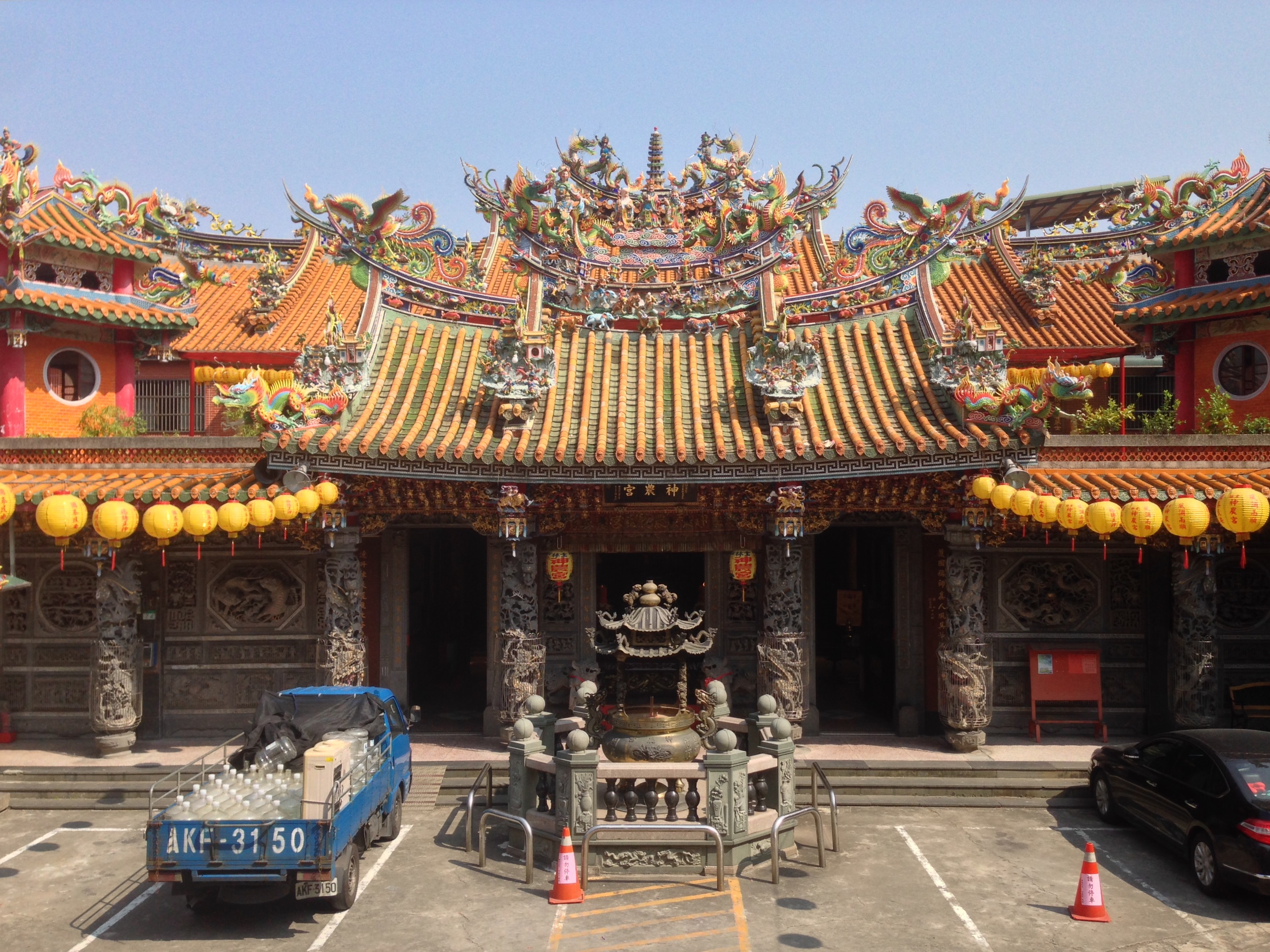

- Taiwan

Religion
- Affiliation: Taoism

Location
- Location: Shilin, Taipei, Taiwan
- Interactive map of Shilin Shennong Temple
- Coordinates: 25°05′52.1″N 121°31′34.9″E

Architecture
- Type: Chinese temple
- Completed: 1709 (original building); 1971 (current building)

The Shilin Shennong Temple (traditional Chinese: 士林神農宮; simplified Chinese: 士林神农宫; pinyin: Shìlín Shénnóng Gōng) is a Chinese temple dedicated to Shennong Dadi and it is located in Shilin District, Taipei, Taiwan.

== History ==
The temple was originally constructed as Fude Shrine for Tudigong in 1709 in Shulin Village. In 1741, the temple was destroyed by flood. As a result, it was relocated to its current location at Jiujia Village and rebuilt with the name Zhilan Temple by immigrants from Zhangzhou in Fujian. In 1812, the temple was renamed Shennong Temple. The temple was once an important base during a conflict between settlers from Zhangzhou and Quanzhou. In 1972, the temple was renovated when reinforced concrete was introduced to construct the Three Rivers Hall and Bell and Drum Tower. In 1993, the main wall was renovated into a two-story building.

== Transportation ==
The temple is accessible within walking distance north of Shilin Station of Taipei Metro.

== See also ==
- Chih Shan Yen Hui Chi Temple
- List of temples in Taiwan
- List of tourist attractions in Taiwan
