= Yangmingshan American Military Housing =

Yangmingshan American Military Housing 陽明山美軍宿舍群
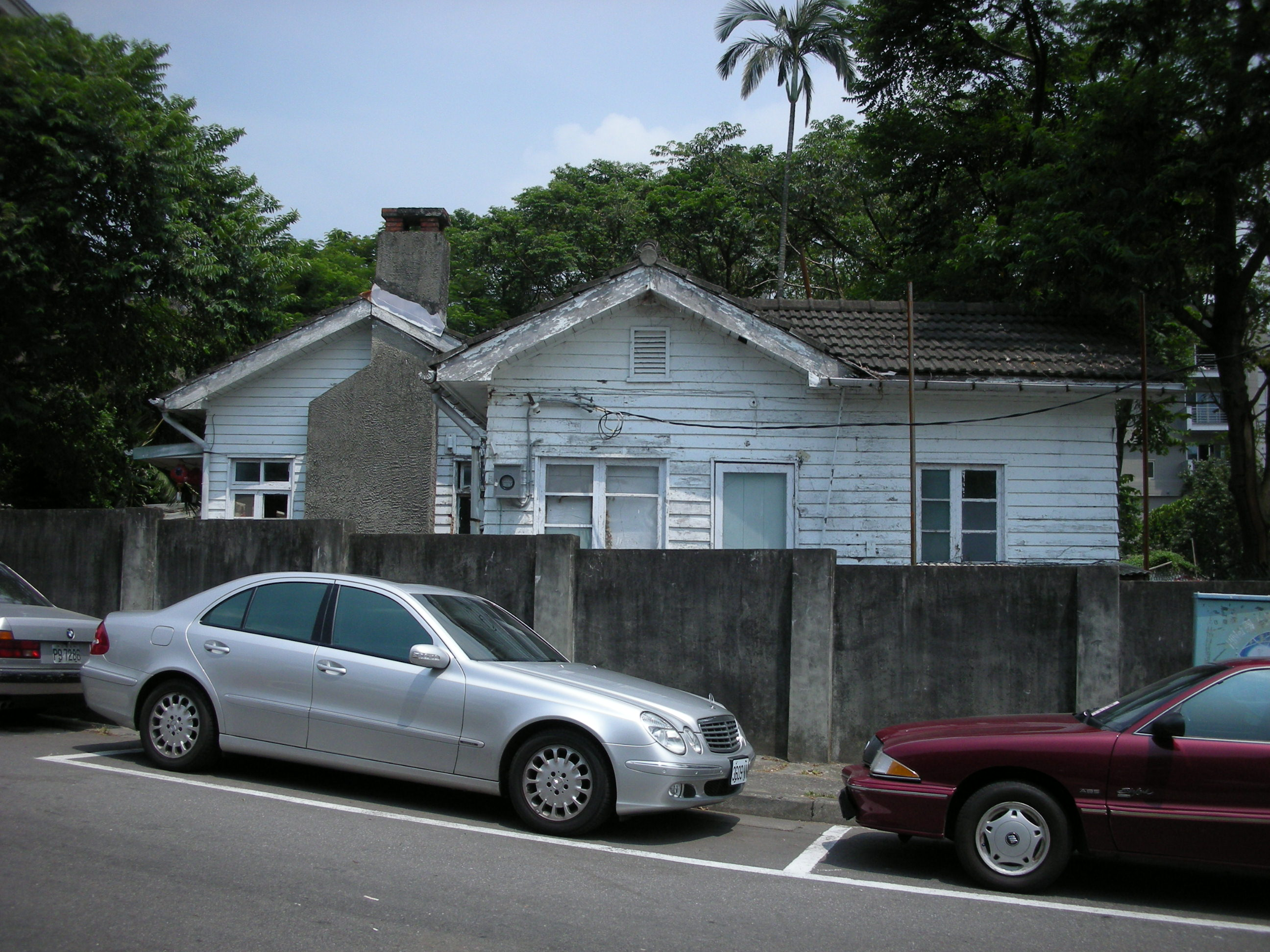

- Location within Taiwan
- Location: Taipei, Taiwan

History
- Built: 1950
- Built for: United States Taiwan Defense Command; MAAG, Taiwan

The Yangmingshan American Military Housing (Chinese: 陽明山美軍宿舍群), is a historical site located in Yangmingshan, Taipei, Taiwan. It is located on a 13.88-hectare (34.3-acre) plot of land near the Chinese Culture University in Shantzehou (山仔后, or Shanzihou) with around 150 old American buildings—for U.S. Military officers, Advisors and their dependents in Taiwan—in various states of preservation.

== History ==
In 1950, the United States began stationing large numbers of troops on Taiwan in order to provide training, support, and economic aid to the Republic of China. In order to provide housing for the American military officers based in Taiwan, the United States built residences for them. The largest remaining intact group of residences is located in Yangmingshan.

When the United States severed official diplomatic relations with the Republic of China in 1978, the houses were abandoned. However, the Bank of Taiwan began renting out part of the houses to locals, including such noted people as Lin Yang-kang and Stan Lai. Other houses taken over by the Council for Economic Planning and Development are now residences for employees of the American Institute in Taiwan (AIT).

The former Armed Forces Network Radio Taiwan (now called ICRT) was also located in the area until the year 2000, when it relocated to Zhongshan District, Taipei.

== Photo Gallery ==
Brick Yard 33 1/3

Interior of the Brick Yard 33 1/3

Brick Yard 33 1/3

Backyard of the Brick Yard 33 1/3

Backyard of the Brick Yard 33 1/3

== See also ==
- Tianmu, Shilin District
- Taipei American School
- Taiwan–United States relations
