= Dayeh Takashimaya Department Store =

Shopping mall in Shilin, Taipei, Taiwan

- 大葉高島屋百貨公司

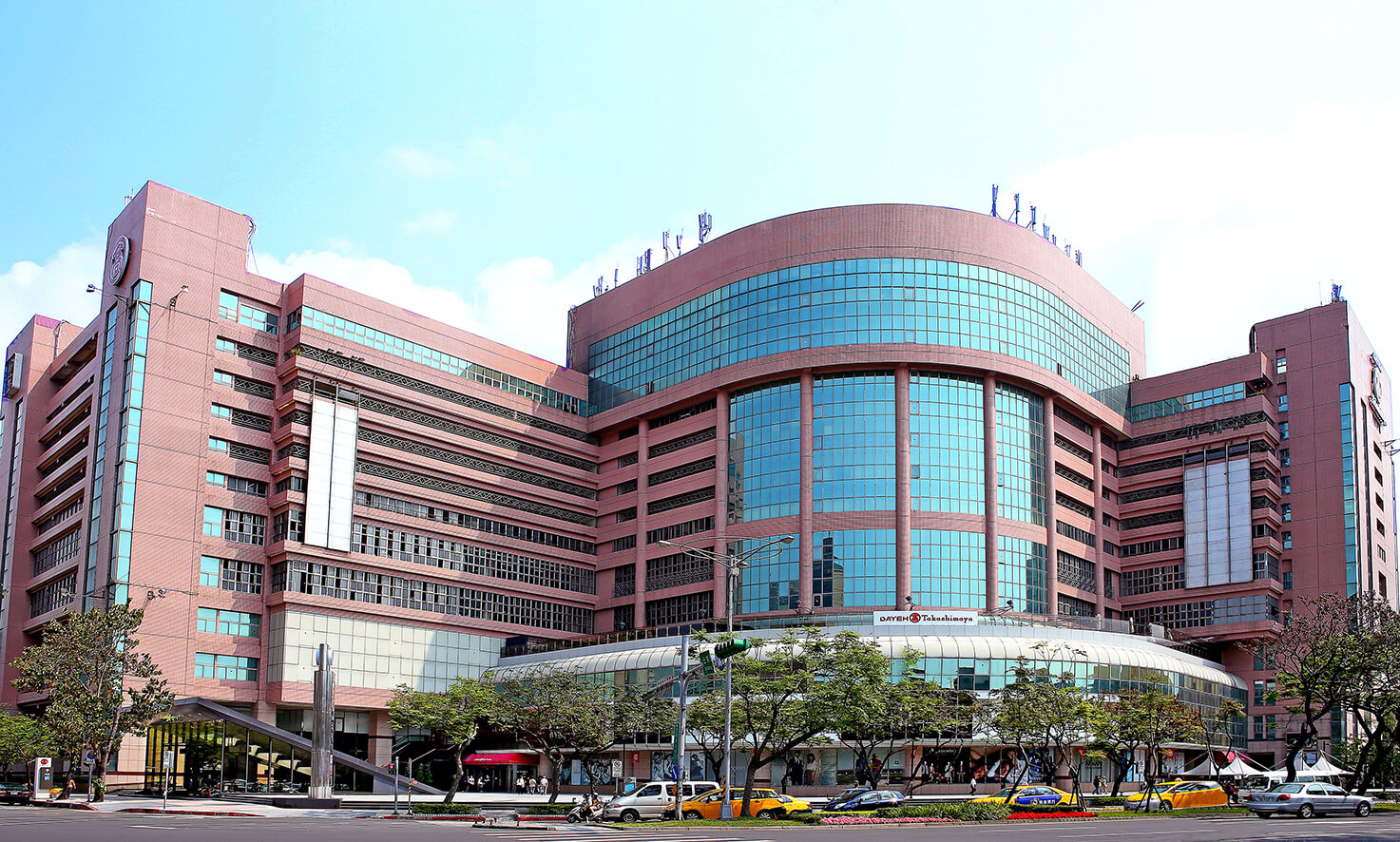
- Location: No. 55, Section 2, ZhongCheng Road, Shilin District, Taipei, Taiwan
- Coordinates: 25.11181499869665°N 121.53134009570665°E
- Opened: 1 November 1994
- Floor area: 39,600 m^{2} (426,000 sq ft)
- Floors: 12 above ground 3 below ground
- Parking: 2000
- Public transit: Mingde metro station
- Website: http://www.dayeh-takashimaya.com.tw/

The Dayeh Takashimaya Department Store (Chinese: 大葉高島屋百貨公司) is a department store in Shilin District, Taipei, Taiwan that opened on 1 November 1994. With a total floor area of 39,600 m^{2} (426,000 sq ft) and 2000 parking spaces, the department store has 12 floors above ground and three basement levels. Main core stores include Muji, Books Kinokuniya, Jasons Market Place and various themed restaurants. The department store was originally jointly operated by Dayeh Group and Takashimaya, but on 17 May 2016, Takashimaya announced that it has decided to sell all the stakes to Dayeh Group, but the name of the department store remained unchanged.

== See also ==
- List of tourist attractions in Taipei
