= American Chamber of Commerce in Taiwan =

Advocacy organization of U.S. companies in Taiwan

American Chamber of Commerce in Taiwan 台灣美國商會
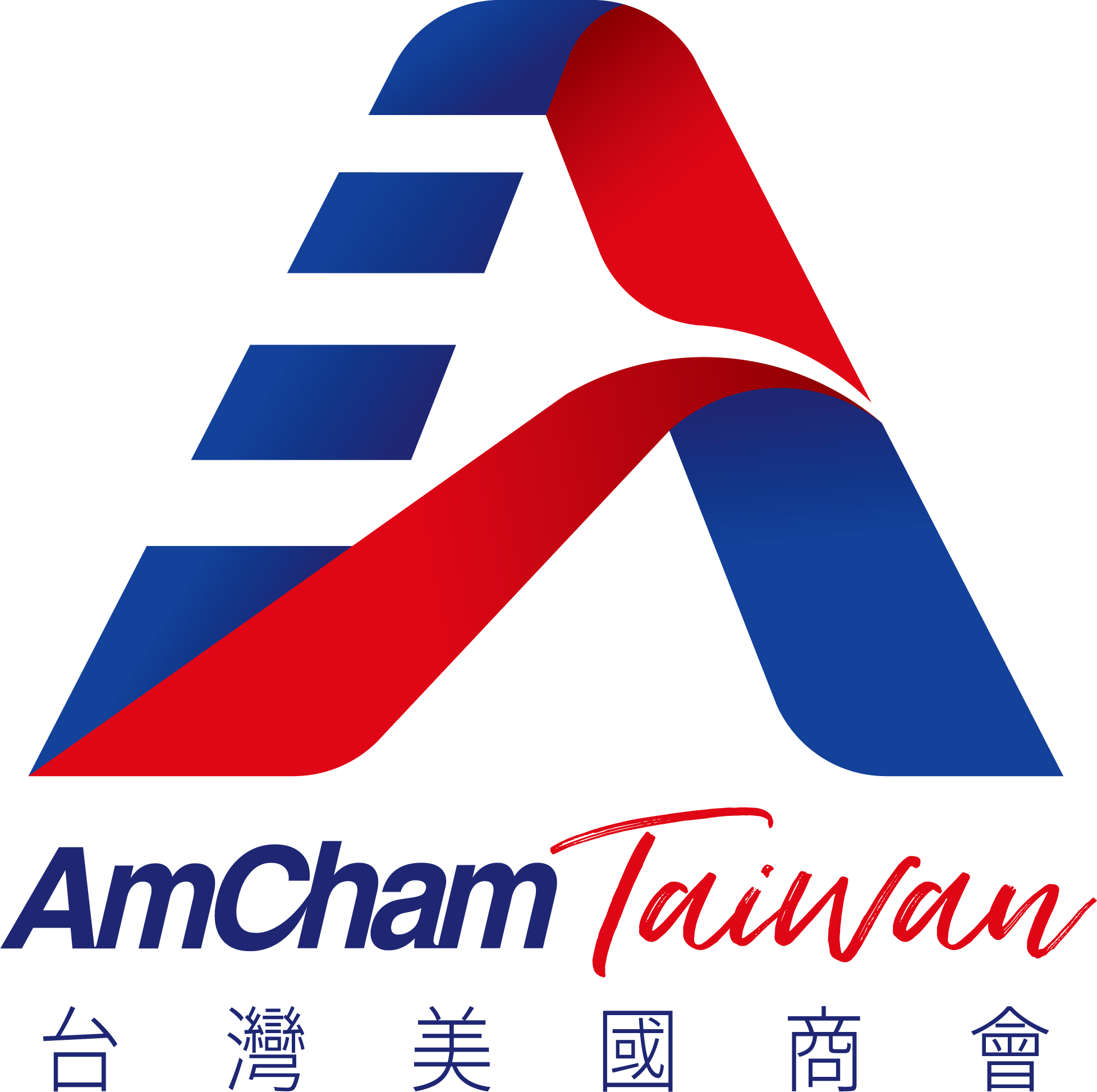
- Current logo
- Founded: 1951
- Type: Chamber of commerce
- Purpose: Advocacy, Lobbying
- Location(s): 803, 8F, No. 131, Sec. 3, Minsheng E. Rd. Songshan District, Taipei City; Taiwan
- Region served: Republic of China (Taiwan)
- Key people: Anita Chen, Chairperson (2026); Carl Wegner, President (2025-)
- Website: amcham.com.tw

The American Chamber of Commerce in Taiwan (AmCham Taiwan; Traditional Chinese: 台灣美國商會) is a Taipei-based, non-profit and non-partisan business association founded in 1951 as the American Chamber of Commerce in Taipei (AmCham Taipei; Chinese: 台北市美國商會). It represents the interests of American and international businesses in Taiwan through policy advocacy, industry committees, and forums aimed at improving Taiwan’s business environment and strengthening U.S. - Taiwan economic relations. AmCham Taiwan publishes a monthly journal entitled Taiwan Business TOPICS. It is a founding member of the Asia-Pacific Council of American Chambers of Commerce.

== Organization and leadership ==
An elected Board of Governors oversees AmCham and chooses one of its members to serve as chairperson for a one-year term. The board also hires a president to guide the overall direction and manage the day-to-day operations of the chamber. The current president is Carl Wegner.

== Activities ==
AmCham Taiwan represents its members in policy discussions with the Taiwan government, notably through its annual Business Climate Survey and Taiwan White Paper. The Chamber also organizes networking events, forums, summits, and luncheons with government officials to facilitate exchanges among members and dialogue with policymakers. It sends an annual delegation to Washington, D.C., known as the “Doorknock,” and hosts visiting U.S. delegations in Taiwan to promote bilateral engagement and provide insight into Taiwan’s business environment.

=== Committees ===
Much of AmCham Taiwan’s advocacy work is conducted through industry-specific and cross-sectoral committees. Each committee prepares a Priority Issues Paper for inclusion in the annual Taiwan White Paper and engages with relevant government agencies and regulators to discuss its recommendations. Committees also organize informational programs and networking opportunities for members.

=== Taiwan White Paper ===
Each year, AmCham publishes a white paper that summarizes AmCham's recommendations to the government and public on legislative, regulatory, and enforcement issues that have a major impact on the quality of the business environment. The primary purposes are information-sharing and advocacy. The paper assesses the Taiwan business climate on both the macro level and sector by sector. It provides a review of the status of last year's priority issues, states the current issues identified by AmCham's industry-specific committees, and offers recommendations to the U.S. government.

=== Taiwan Business TOPICS ===
A monthly magazine that is distributed in print across Taiwan and the United States and made available online. The bilingual publication offers articles on topics ranging from business, industry, and geopolitical developments to travel, culture, and life in Taiwan. Cover stories have featured such subjects as the need for rare earth minerals in the Age of AI, the power of precision medicine in advancing national health initiatives, and the impact of extended reality on the modern world. The readership is approximately 35,000 monthly.

President Lee Teng-hui was the first president to attend AmCham’s Hsieh Nien Fan. And ever since, it has become a tradition for his successors to deliver remarks at the event.

=== Hsieh Nien Fan ===
An AmCham tradition since 1970, the Hsieh Nien Fan banquet is an opportunity to thank Taiwan government officials for their assistance in the previous year. Customarily, Taiwan's sitting president is the keynote speaker.

=== Washington "Doorknock" ===
Each year, an AmCham Taiwan delegation travels to Washington, D.C., for its annual “Doorknock,” meeting with officials from the U.S. executive branch and Congress, as well as representatives of think tanks and member companies. The meetings address members’ policy priorities and issues affecting U.S.–Taiwan trade, investment, and broader economic cooperation.

=== Business Climate Survey ===
Toward the end of each year, AmCham Taiwan surveys its member companies about their views of Taiwan’s business environment and economic outlook, as well as their future investment plans. The results are published early the following year and submitted to the Taiwan government for reference. The report also serves as an indicator of international business confidence in Taiwan and companies’ investment intentions.

== History ==
AmCham registered with the Taipei City Government on 14 September 1951. The heads of five U.S. companies—three trading companies and the oil companies Caltex and Standard Vacuum (the precursor of both Exxon and Mobil)—joined originally to lobby Washington to open Taiwan's procurement of equipment, raw materials, and commodities to U.S. private companies.

After this early success, AmCham grew, with early members including Eli Lilly, Mattel, Timex, and distributors for U.S. motion pictures. By the 1960s, the chamber was developing into an active professional organization: In 1967, it held its first formal breakfast meeting; in 1968, it became a founding member of the new Asia-Pacific Council of American Chambers (APCAC); and in 1969, AmCham published the first issue of its bimonthly magazine, now called Taiwan Business TOPICS.

In 2021, AmCham Taipei changed its name to AmCham Taiwan.

=== Supporting Economic Development ===
U.S. companies played an important role in laying the groundwork for Taiwan's later economic achievements in the consumer electronics, computer, semiconductor, and flat panel display industries.

General Instrument's decision in 1964 to set up a subsidiary on the island to make various electronic components was a pioneering investment that prompted other major U.S. electronics companies to follow suit and laid the groundwork for Taiwan's entry into consumer electronics, which eventually led to the production of computers, semiconductors, and flat panel displays. General Instrument grew into one of Taiwan's biggest employers; by 1980, it had 10,000 workers.

American firms also helped advance Taiwan's 10 Big Projects, which in the 1970s provided the infrastructure foundation for the island's future economic prosperity. For Taiwan's first international-standard freeway—the Sun Yat-sen Freeway stretching from Keelung to Kaohsiung—U.S. engineering companies helped to conduct feasibility studies, design several sections, and provide construction engineering and inspection. Numerous American companies, including Amoco Chemical, Mesta Machine, General Electric (GE), Westinghouse, and U.S. Steel Corp., provided Taiwan's first integrated steel mill and its new petrochemical complex with investment, procurement, training, and engineering consultation.

American firms like Texas Instruments and Varian Associates were early entrants into the Hsinchu Science Park. Established in 1980 and inspired by the Stanford Research Park that nurtured Silicon Valley, Hsinchu has helped foster the development of some renowned global technology companies.

=== Helping Forge the Taiwan Relations Act ===
Following the shock of U.S. recognition of the People's Republic of China, AmCham's leadership played an instrumental role in determining the form of the continued U.S. relationship with Taiwan.

A page from a 1977 letter from then-AmCham President Marinus van Gessel to U.S. President Jimmy Carter.

In 1976, under the chairmanship of Marinus "Dutch" van Gessel, AmCham made the strategic decision not to oppose the improvement of U.S. relations with mainland China—as long as it was not done at the expense of Taiwan. Van Gessel had previously served as Deputy Assistant Secretary in the U.S. Department of Commerce and by 1976 was heading up the Taiwan operations of Corning Glass. Concerned with giving due consideration to the potential impact on U.S. business interests of any change in U.S. diplomatic relations, in January 1977, van Gessel wrote a paper entitled The U.S. and the ROC: A Businessman’s View—A Position Paper of the American Chamber of Commerce in the ROC. The document laid out many of the principles later incorporated in the Taiwan Relations Act, the law passed by Congress in 1980 that has formed the basis of U.S. relations with Taiwan ever since.

Van Gessel also testified before a congressional committee in 1977, and he organized a letter-writing campaign to congressional offices and others in Washington to argue that the U.S. commitment to Taiwan's security was not only a military and diplomatic issue, but also crucial to the stability of the business environment.

The Shanghai Communique of 1972 made clear that the U.S. and China intended to normalize relations. Nevertheless, the timing of President Carter's announcement of derecognition of the R.O.C. in December 1978 caught Taiwan, and the American business community there, by surprise. According to the chamber, "AmCham did not object to U.S. recognition of the PRC per se, but strongly objected to the terms of the agreement and to the discourtesy of the lack of proper advance notice to Taiwan."

Cover of Robert P. Parker’s February 1979 testimony before the U.S. Senate on the Taiwan Relations Act.

Robert P. Parker (AmCham chairman in 1979 and 1980) played a key role in helping to reaffirm U.S. friendship with Taiwan. In February 1979, he represented AmCham in testimony before the U.S. Senate Foreign Relations Committee and the House Foreign Affairs Committee on the "Omnibus Legislation" that had been drafted by the U.S. State Department and proposed by the Carter administration as the basis for future unofficial relations with "the people of Taiwan."

In his remarks, Parker emphasized that "normalization" jeopardized American economic interests in Taiwan and offered specific proposals for correcting the proposed legislation's failure to provide adequately for the security of Taiwan from threat or use of coercion from mainland China, as well as failure to offer a clear and sufficient legal framework for the continuation of U.S.–Taiwan relationships sufficient for continued trade and investment.

Parker noted that the prompt enactment of these specific proposals "would not only be in the interest of American business, [but also] necessary to meet our country’s moral responsibilities to Taiwan and its people."

The final version of the Taiwan Relations Act (TRA) saw virtually all of AmCham's principal recommendations written into law.

=== Managing the Impact of Derecognition ===
In the wake of the official switch of U.S. diplomatic relations, uncertainty surrounded the potential impact on Americans and other foreign residents in Taiwan. As the U.S. embassy in Taipei wrapped up its operations, AmCham stepped in to serve as the main conduit for communication with the Taiwan authorities to preserve or establish needed expatriate community organizations.

AmCham worked to establish International Community Radio Taiwan (ICRT) to replace the Armed Forced Network Taiwan (AFNT), which stopped broadcasting English-language news, entertainment, and vital emergency information on typhoons and earthquakes. The departure of the U.S. military also risked leaving a gap in social and recreational programs. The chamber helped to create the Taipei Youth Program Association to provide recreational opportunities for expat children, and arranged for a new and larger location for the American Club in China (ACC). The chamber also secured the legal status of the Taipei American School, then the sole large-scale institution of international education on the island.

=== Encouraging WTO Accession and Cross-Border Flows ===
In January 2002, Taiwan acceded to the World Trade Organization (WTO) under the name of Customs Territory of Taiwan, Penghu, Kinmen and Matsu. In 2008, Taiwan signed the Government Procurement Agreement (GPA) under the WTO and began regularly scheduled cross-strait direct air service. Committed to the easy flow of people, goods, services, and investment, AmCham lobbied hard for these developments.

== Related organizations ==
- United States Chamber of Commerce
- US–Taiwan Business Council
- American Institute in Taiwan
