= International Community Radio Taipei =

International Community Radio Taipei 台北國際社區廣播電台
- Taiwan
- Frequencies: 100.7 FM (Taipei, Kaohsiung); 100.1 FM (Taichung); 100.8 FM (Chiayi)
- Branding: ICRT FM 100

Programming
- Format: English music

Ownership
- Owner: Taipei International Community Cultural Foundation

History
- First air date: 16 April 1979 (previously Armed Forces Network Taiwan)

Technical information
- ERP: 3× 30 kilowatts

Links
- Website: www.icrt.com.tw

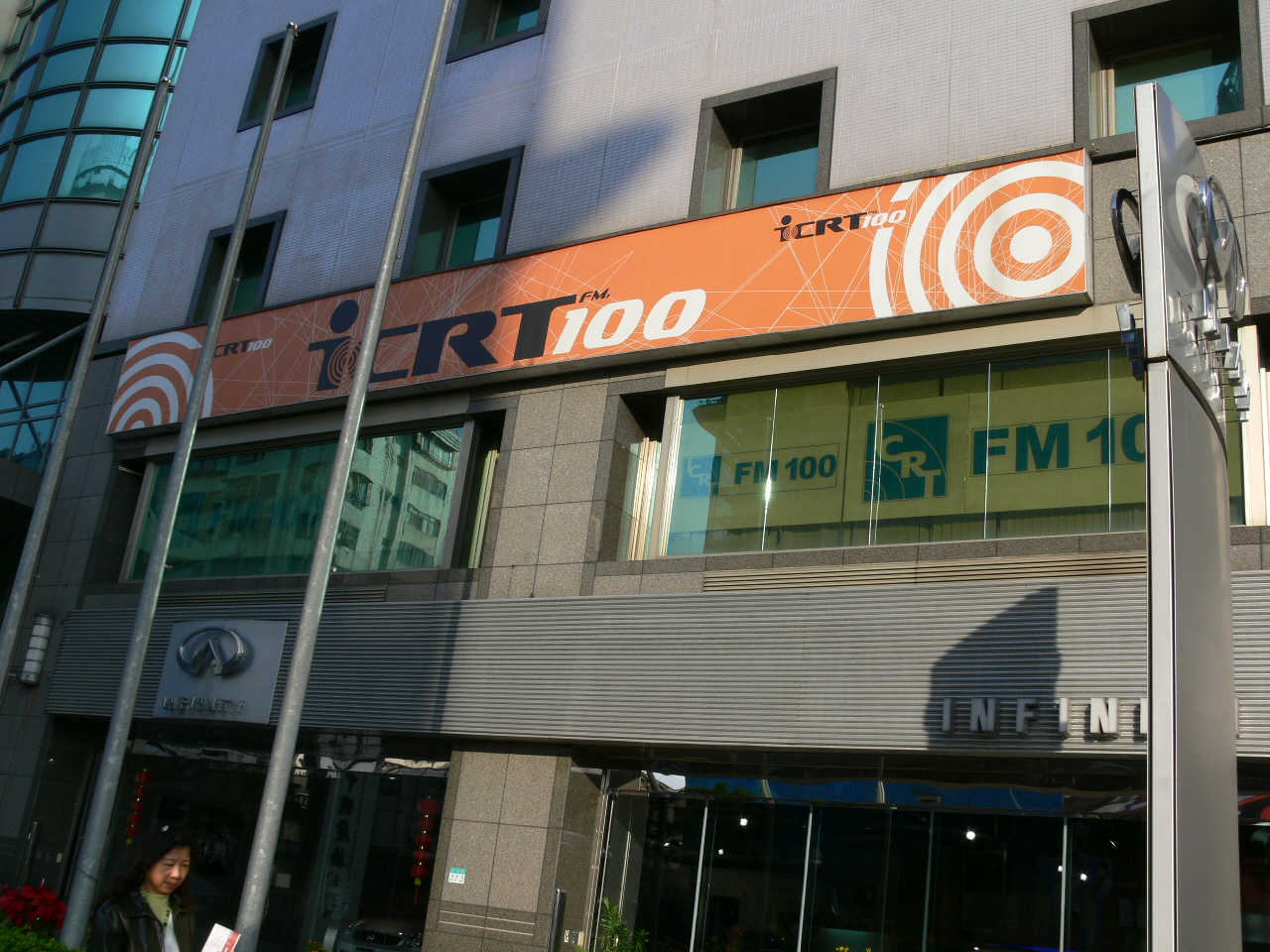
International Community Radio Taipei headquarters at BCC Songjiang Building

International Community Radio Taipei (ICRT; Chinese: 台北國際社區廣播電台; pinyin: Táiběi Guójì Shèqū Guǎngbō Diàntái) is Taiwan's only English-language radio station and first radio station in Taiwan that caters to foreigners. Prior to 1979, the station served the U.S. military personnel in Taiwan as the Armed Forces Network Taiwan (AFNT). When the United States broke diplomatic ties with the Republic of China in 1979, the American business community, with the help of the ROC government, reorganized the station into ICRT.

== History ==
=== Origins ===
From 1957 to 1979, the station served the US military community in Taiwan as the Armed Forces Network Taiwan (AFNT). After the United States broke diplomatic ties with the Republic of China on Taiwan in 1979, Rear Admiral James B. Linder, last commander of the United States Taiwan Defense Command (USTDC), informed a letter to the Taiwanese Government Information Office (GIO) pointing out that equipments of the AFNT be transferred to the ROC Government by the US Federal Government without compensation. The new radio station, under the name of ICRT, was reorganized by the American Chamber of Commerce in Taipei and the ROC government.

=== 1990s ===
The station started to suffer from operating challenges in the 1990s. The ROC government liberalized the radio market, forcing ICRT to face competition from other radio stations. AM576's programming lineup became weaker and lacked DJs to cover the entire twenty-four hours of air time, resulting in an automated jukebox system to replace the DJ. Eventually AM576 only broadcast the BBC World Service and CNN Radio and then went permanently off the air in 1999. News coverage in FM100 was gradually downsized. In 2000, ICRT moved from its original location on Yangmingshan to Taipei City.

== ICRT today ==
=== Radio plays ===
In 2012, ICRT teamed up with a Taipei-based drama group, Red Room Radio Redux, to begin production of radio plays. The inaugural production was Charles Dickens’ A Christmas Carol, which aired on Christmas Eve and Christmas Day. Planned future productions include Orson Welles’ The War of the Worlds.

== Sources ==
- Fox, Butterfield (22 May 1979). Taiwan Radio in English Beams Assurances on US Ties. The New York Times, p. A2.
- Kristof, Nicholas D. (4 January 1992). The Voice of Taiwan Speaks English. The New York Times, p. 4.
- Leonard, Andrew (July 1992). Taiwan Twist. Columbia Journalism Review, p. 16.
- Phipps, Gavin (16 May 2004). A Quarter Century of Community Radio. Taipei Times, p. 18.
