= Mingde metro station =

Metro station in Taipei, Taiwan

Mingde 明德
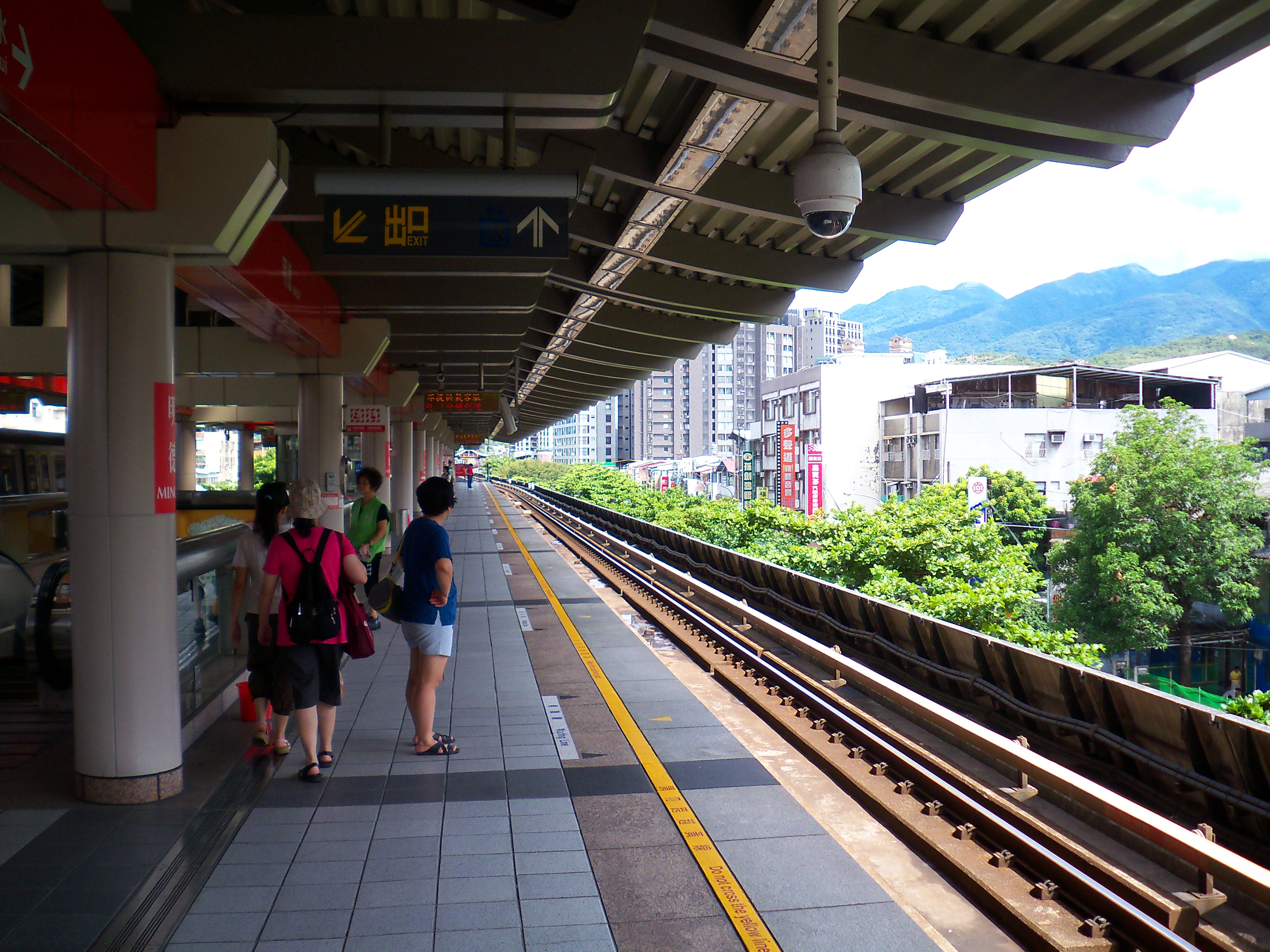
- Mingde station platform

Chinese name
- Chinese: 明德
Transcriptions
Standard Mandarin
- Hanyu Pinyin: Míngdé
- Bopomofo: ㄇㄧㄥˊ ㄉㄜˊ
- Wade–Giles: Ming^{2}-tê^{2}
- Tongyong Pinyin: Míngdé
Hakka
- Pha̍k-fa-sṳ: Mìn-tet
Southern Min
- Hokkien POJ: Bêng-tek
- Tâi-lô: Bîng-tik

General information
- Location: No. 95, Mingde Rd. Beitou, Taipei; Taiwan
- Coordinates: 25.109811°N 121.518778°E
- Operator: Taipei Metro
- Line: Tamsui–Xinyi Line
- Connections: Bus stop

Construction
- Structure type: Elevated

Other information
- Station code: R18

History
- Opened: 28 March 1997

Passengers
- daily (December 2024)
- Rank: 64 out of 109

Services
| Preceding station | Taipei Metro | Following station |
|---|---|---|
| Zhishan towards Xiangshan or Daan | Tamsui–Xinyi Line | Shipai towards Tamsui or Beitou |
Location

The Taipei Metro Mingde station (formerly transliterated as Mingte station until 2003, traditional Chinese: 捷運明德站) is located in the Beitou District (北投區) of Taipei, Taiwan. The station is on the Tamsui–Xinyi line, otherwise known as "the Red line" by locals. It is also a minor bus transfer point for connections to Tianmu (天母) and Yangmingshan National Park (陽明山).

== Station overview ==
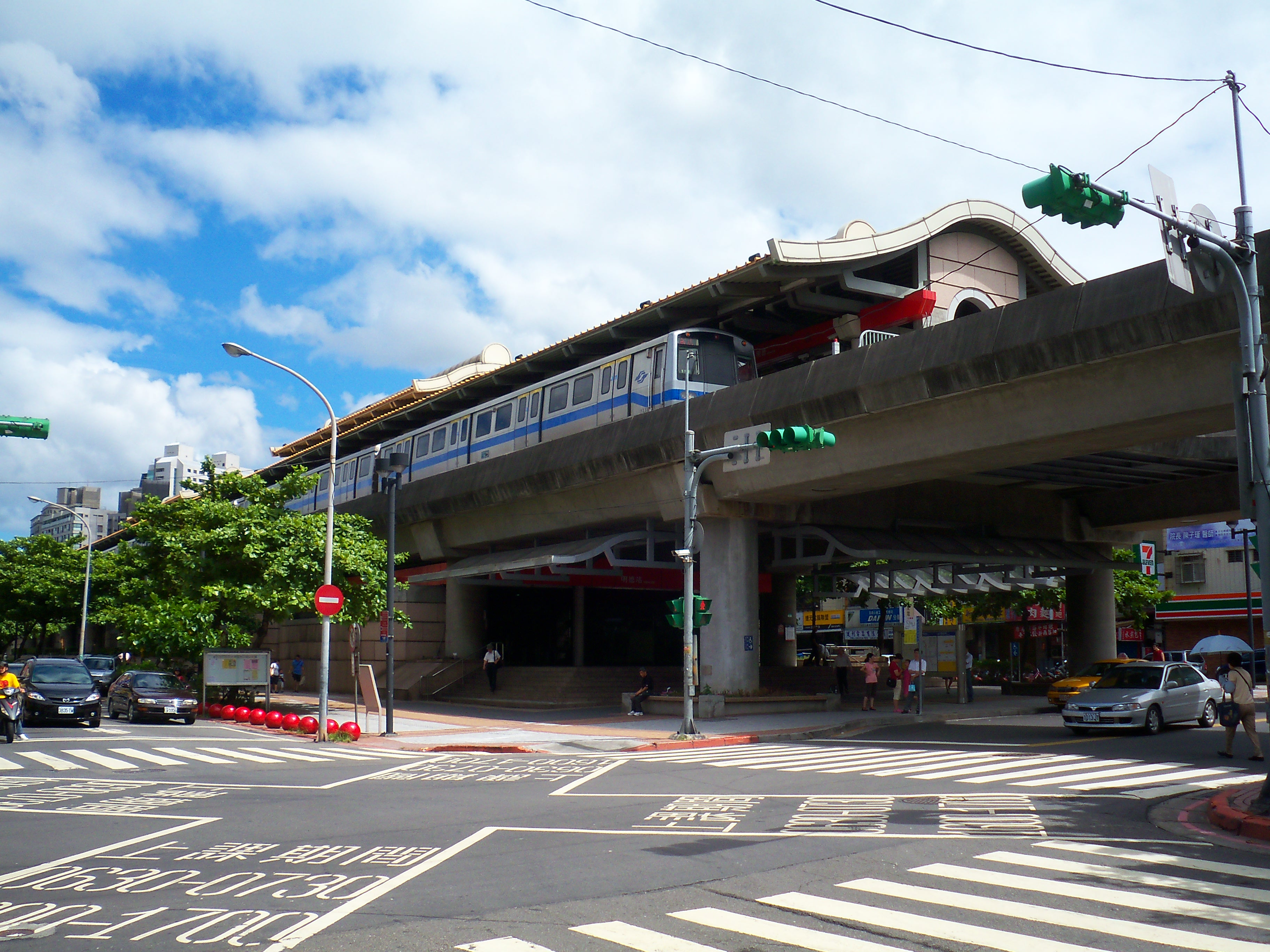
Mingde station exterior

The two-level, elevated station structure has one island platform and three exits, situated between Donghua Street (東華街) and Xi'an Street (西安街) at the midsection of Mingde Road (明德路).

Originally, it was planned to be called "Tianmu station," but this was changed before the station opened on 28 March 1997.

== Station layout ==
| 2F | Platform 1 | ← Tamsui–Xinyi line toward Tamsui / Beitou (R19 Shipai) |
| 2F | Island platform, doors will open on the left |
| 2F | Platform 2 | → Tamsui–Xinyi line toward Xiangshan / Daan (R17 Zhishan) → |
| Street level | Concourse | Exits to several schools, lobby, information desk, automatic ticket dispensing machines, one-way faregates Restrooms |

== First and last train timings ==
The first and last train timings at Mingde station are as follows:

| Destination | First train | | Last train |
| Destination | Mon − Fri | Sat − Sun and P.H. | Daily |
Tamsui–Xinyi line
| R28 Tamsui | 06:05 | 06:05 | 00:52 |
| R01guangci/fengtian palace station | 06:01 | 06:01 | 00:40 |
