= Shipai, Taipei =

Coordinates: 25°2′52″N 121°31′2″E

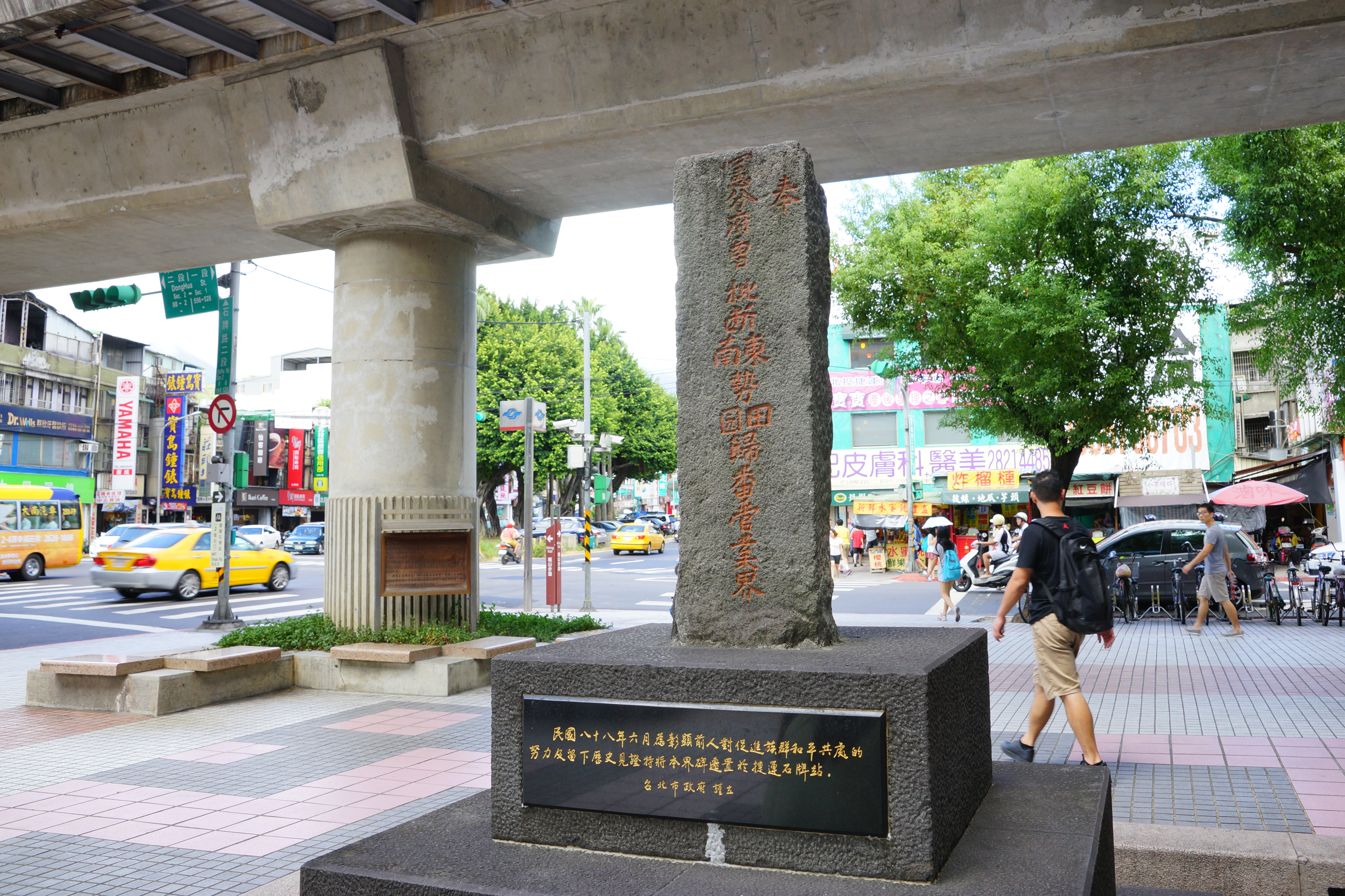
The stone tablet at Shipai Station.

Shipai, Shihpai or Tsio̍h-pâi (Chinese: 石牌; Hanyu Pinyin: Shípái; Tongyong Pinyin: Shíhpái; Pe̍h-ōe-jī: Chio̍h-pâi) is a region in Beitou District, Taipei, Taiwan. It includes eight villages (里): Shipai (石牌), Wenlin (文林), Ronghua (榮華), Zhenhua (振華), Yumin (裕民), Fuxing (福興), Rongguang (榮光), and Jianmin (建民).

== History ==
Shipai was the territory of the indigenous Ketagalan people. In the early Qing Dynasty, Han Chinese started to settle this area. As a result, conflicts broke out between the two sides, which led local officials to erect stone tablets as demarcation between the two groups between 1745 and 1748. The origin of the name Shipai, which means stone tablet, derived from one of these tablets. The original site of the tablet was believed to be located in the Yonghe Neighborhood. It was moved to Shipai Police Station in 1935. In 1999, it was moved to Shipai metro station. It is believed that this location is closer to the original site.

== Education ==
- Shipai Elementary School (石牌國民小學)
- Shipai Junior High School (石牌國民中學)
- National Yang Ming Chiao Tung University

== Transportation ==
- Shipai Station - Taipei Metro Station on the Tamsui Line (Code:R23)
