= Shipai metro station =

Metro station in Taipei, Taiwan

Shipai 石牌
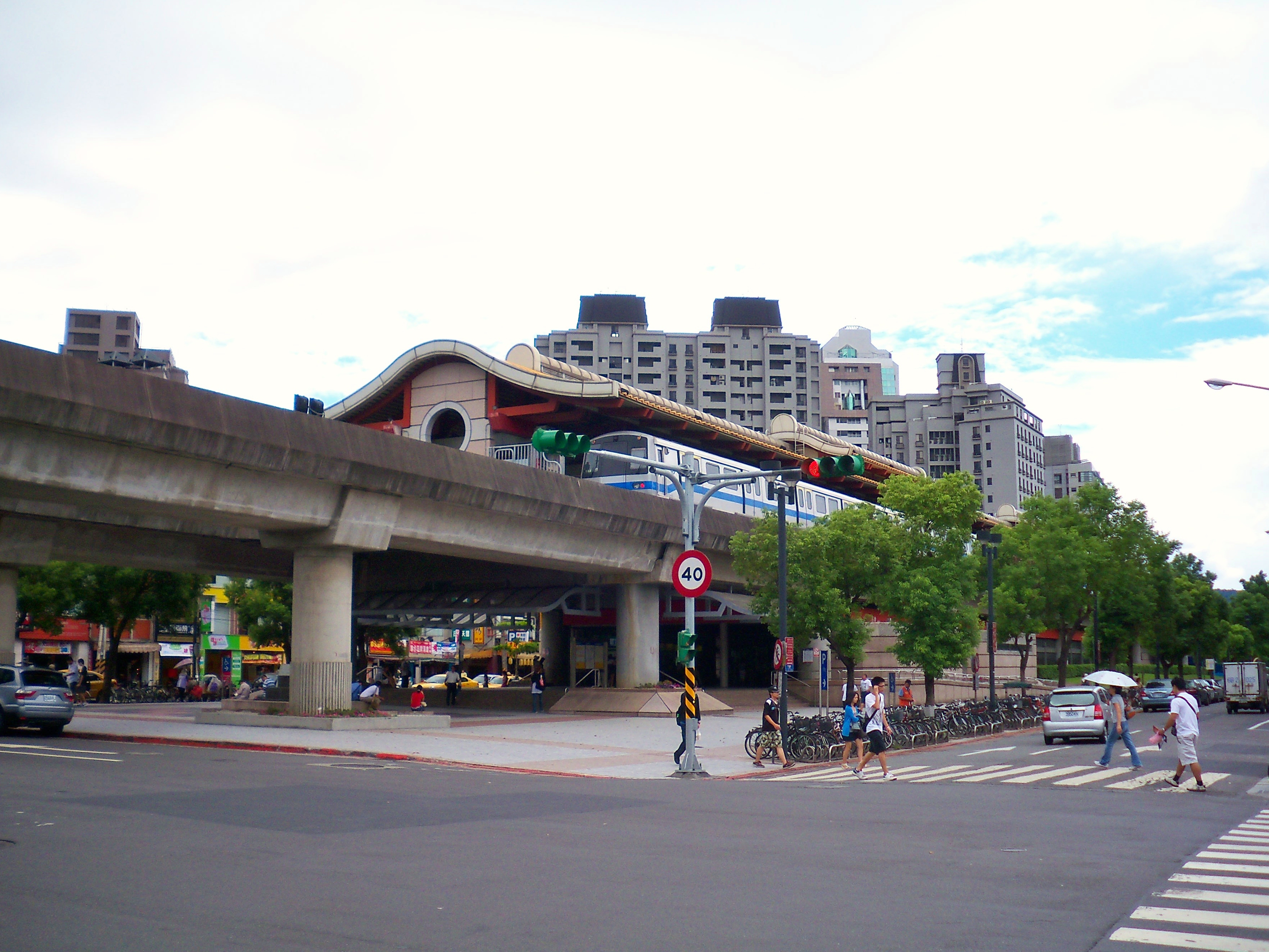
- Exterior

Chinese name
- Chinese: 石牌
- Literal meaning: Stone tablet
Transcriptions
Standard Mandarin
- Hanyu Pinyin: Shípái
- Bopomofo: ㄕˊ ㄆㄞˊ
- Wade–Giles: Shih²-p'ai²
Hakka
- Pha̍k-fa-sṳ: Sa̍k-phài
Southern Min
- Tâi-lô: Tsio̍h-pâi-á (石牌仔)

General information
- Location: 200 Sec 1 Shipai Rd; Beitou, Taipei; Taiwan
- Coordinates: 25.1144°N 121.5156°E
- System: Taipei Metro station
- Operator: Taipei Metro
- Line: Tamsui–Xinyi line

Construction
- Structure type: Elevated
- Cycle facilities: Access available

Other information
- Station code: R19
- Website: web.metro.taipei/e/stationdetail2010.asp?ID=R19-061

History
- Opened: 1997-03-28

Passengers
- 2017: 21.101 million per year ▼0.07%
- Rank: (Ranked 22 of 119)

Services
Preceding station	Taipei Metro	Following station
Mingde towards Xiangshan or Daan	Tamsui–Xinyi line	Qilian towards Tamsui or Beitou
Location

Shipai (Chinese: 石牌; pinyin: Shípái, formerly transliterated as Shihpai Station until 2003) is a metro station in Shipai, Taipei, Taiwan served by Taipei Metro. It is a station on the Tamsui–Xinyi line. In the past, the station belonged to the now-defunct Tamsui railway line.

== Station overview ==
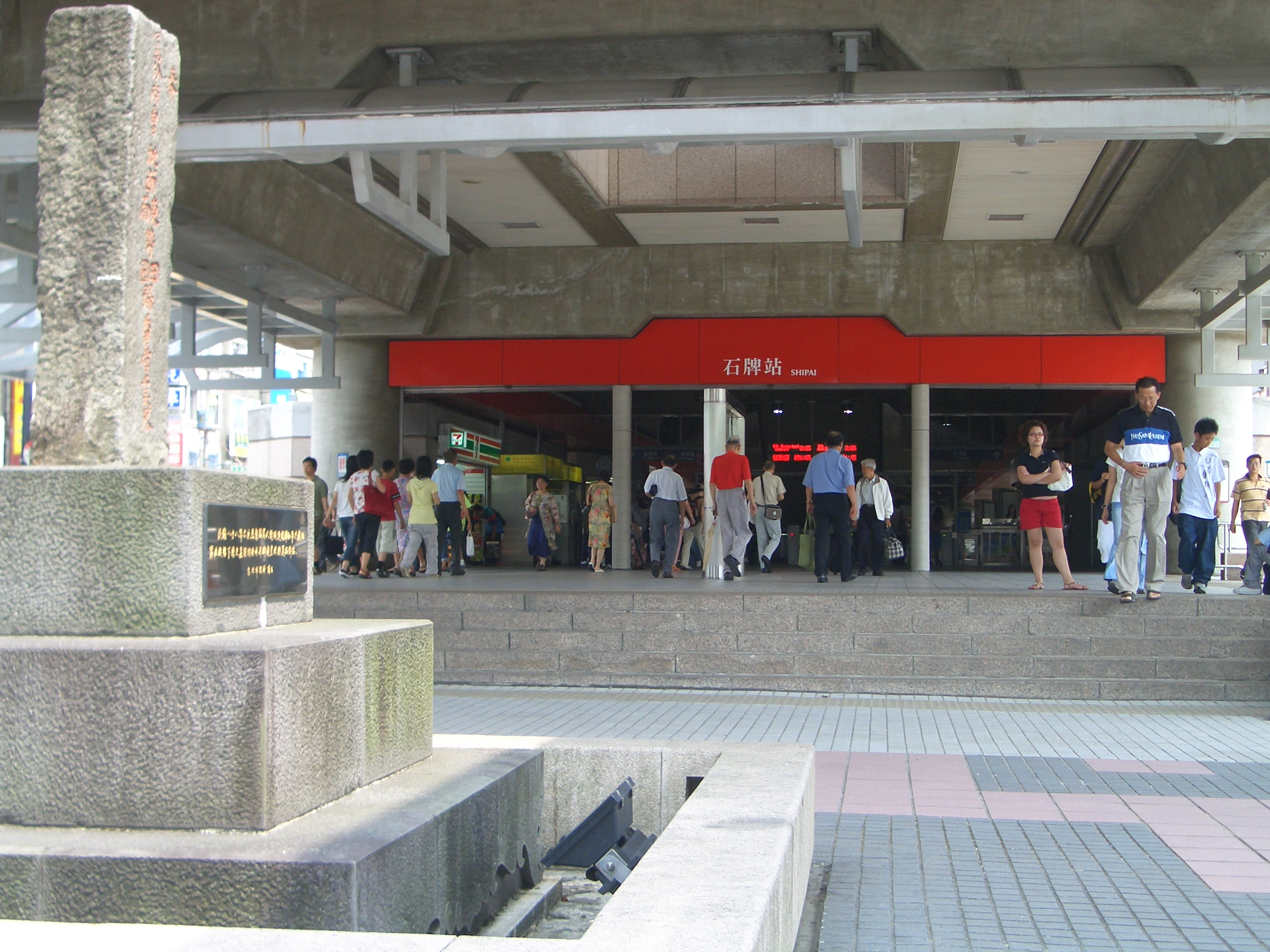
Shipai station exit 1.

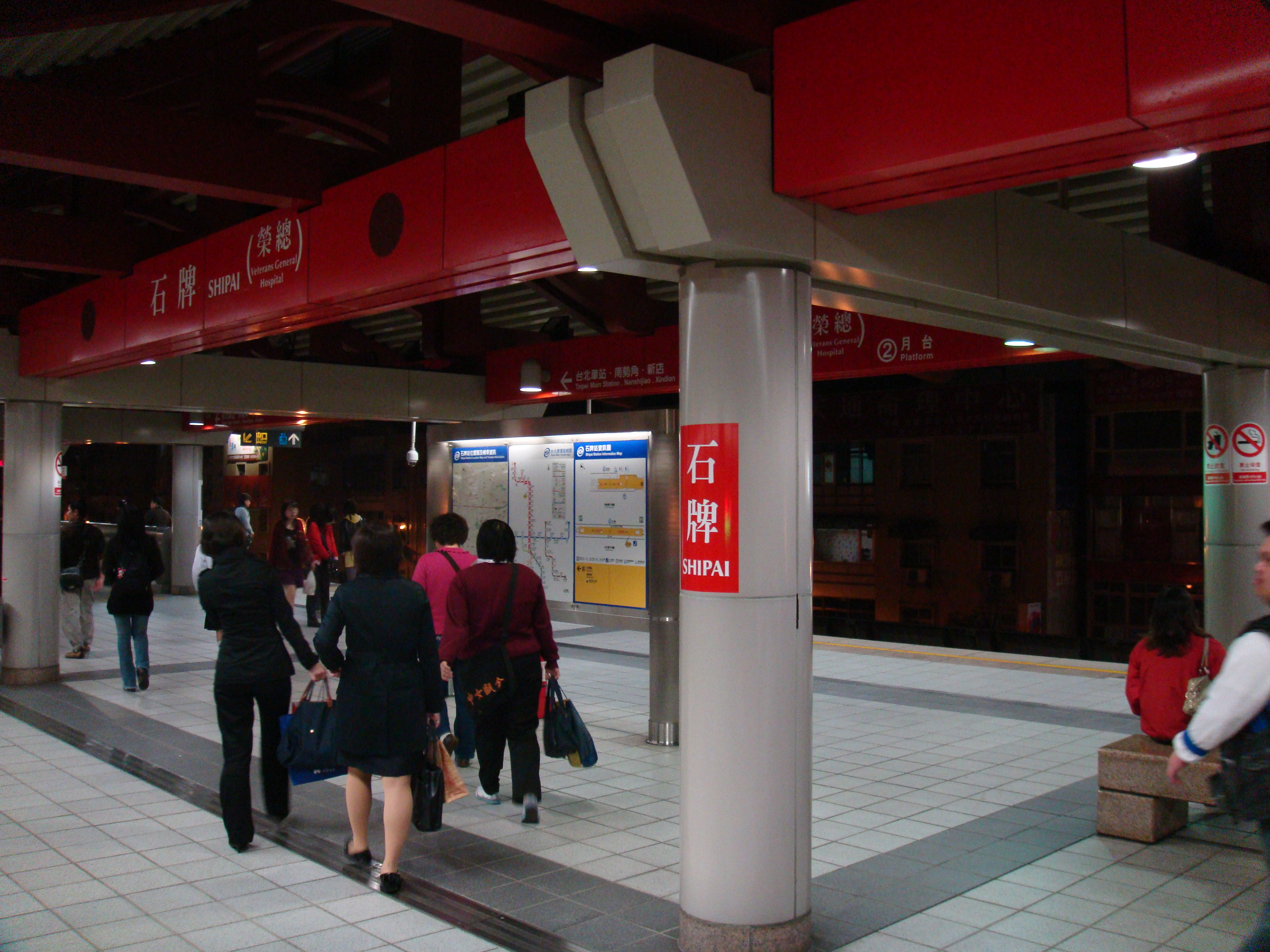
Shipai station platform.

The two-level elevated station features an island platform and has two exits. One exit is located at the intersection of Shipai Rd., Donghua St., and Xian St facing north and the newly built exit is at the other end of the station facing south.

This station connects to Beitou Refuse Incineration Plant, Children's Art Museum in Taipei, National Research Institute of Chinese Medicine, National Taipei University of Nursing and Health Science, National Yang Ming Chiao Tung University, Taipei American School, Taipei Veterans General Hospital and University of Taipei.

== History ==
This station was opened as "Kirigan Station" (Japanese: 唭里岸) on 17 August 1915 under the Tamsui Railroad Line, and was renamed "Shihpai" after the war. The old railway entrance was at Ziqiang Street, Lane 141. It was closed on 15 July 1988 and reopened as a metro station on 28 March 1997. The second exit opened for use on 20 November 2010.

== Station layout ==
2F	Platform 1	← Tamsui–Xinyi line toward Tamsui / Beitou (R20 Qilian)
2F	Island platform, doors will open on the left
2F	Platform 2	→ Tamsui–Xinyi line toward Xiangshan / Daan (R18 Mingde) →
Street Level	Concourse	Entrance/Exit, lobby, information desk, automatic ticket dispensing machines, one-way faregates Restrooms
