= Taipei =

Capital city of Taiwan

Taipei 臺北市 (Note: In local languages: Traditional Chinese script: 臺北市 or 台北市; Mandarin Pinyin: Táiběi Shì; Hokkien: Tâi-pak Tshī; Sixian Hakka: Tǒi-běd Sii; Hailu Hakka: Toi-bed Shi^{+}) Taipak, Taipeh, Taihoku
- Capital city and special municipality
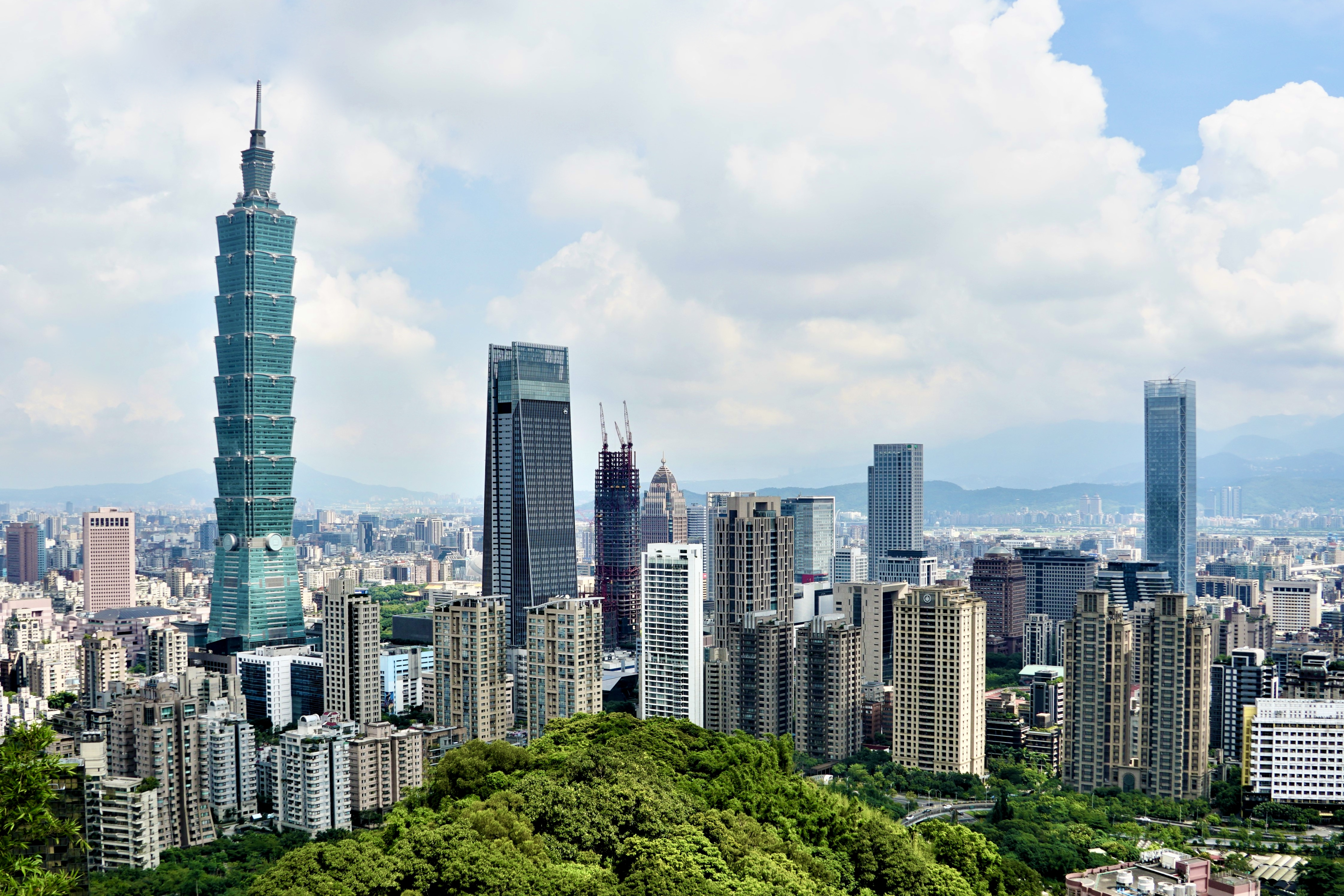
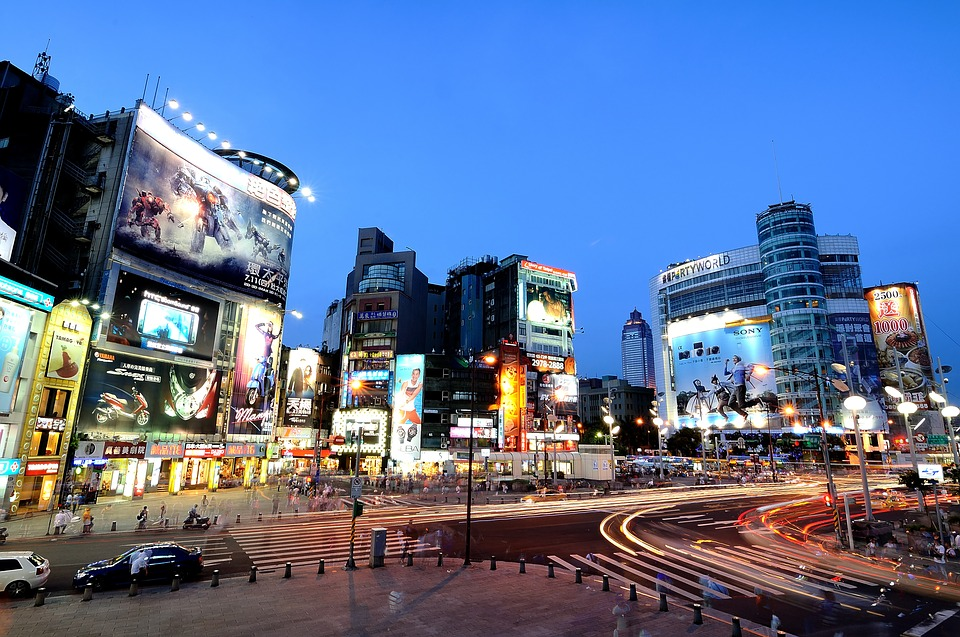
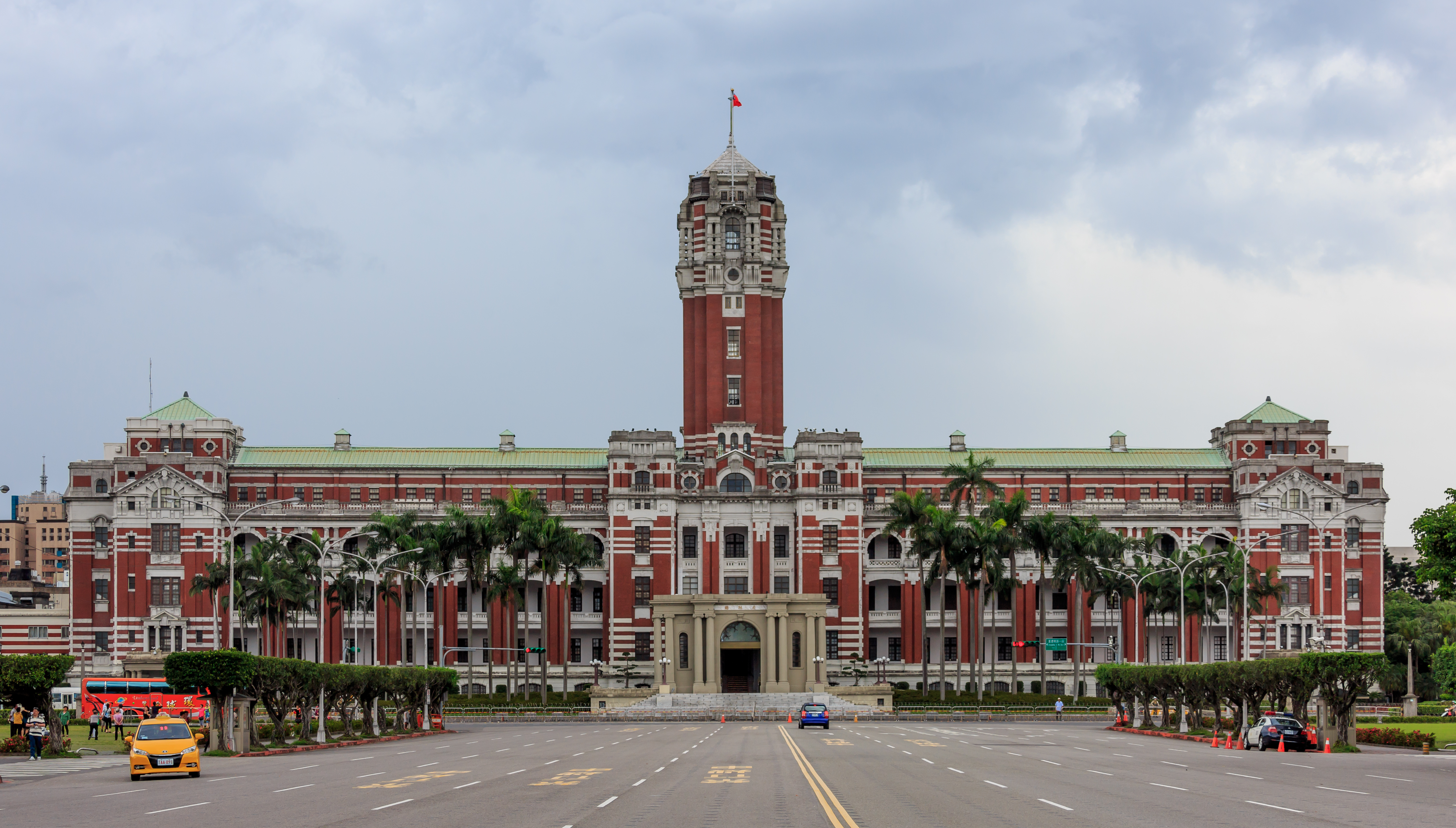
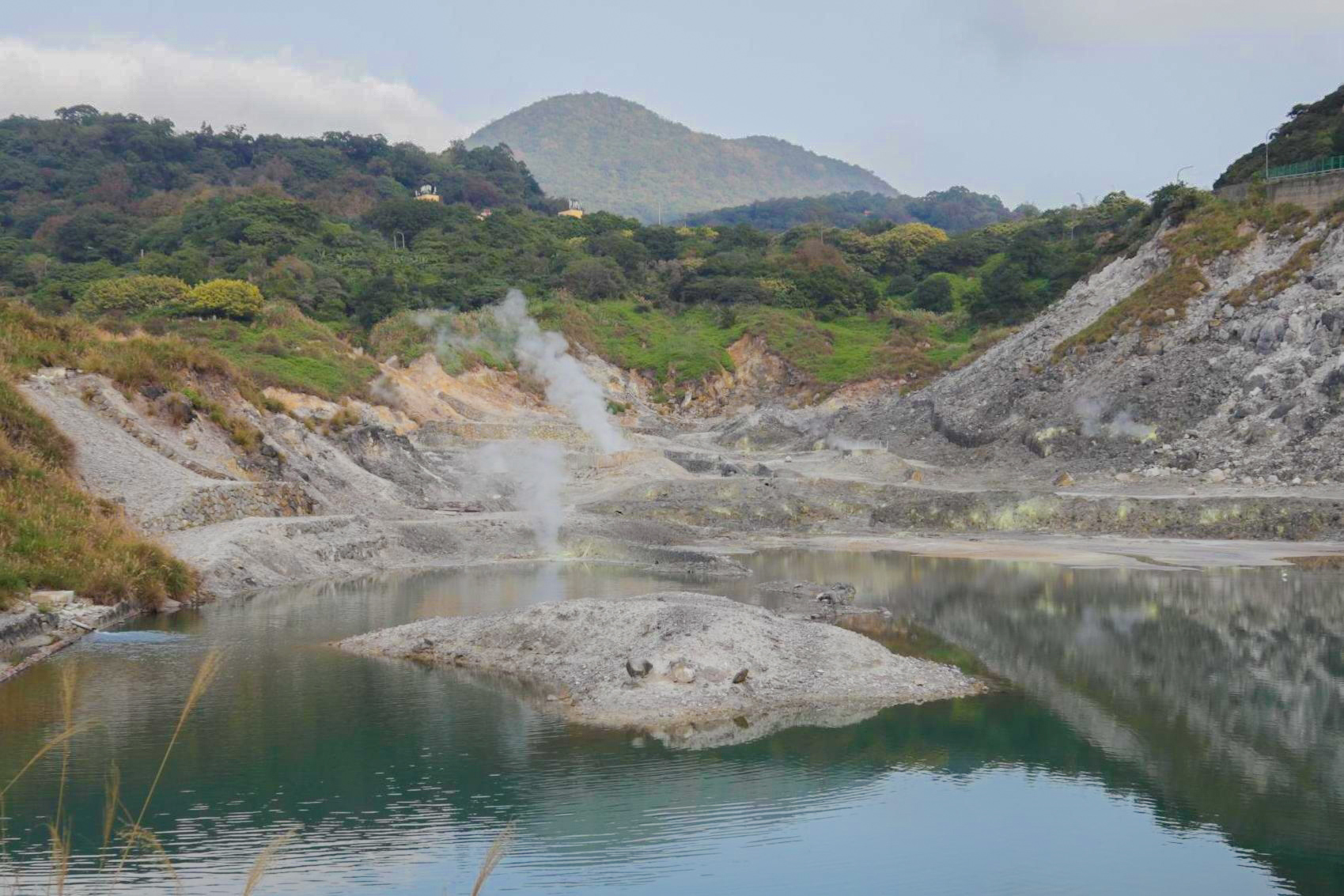
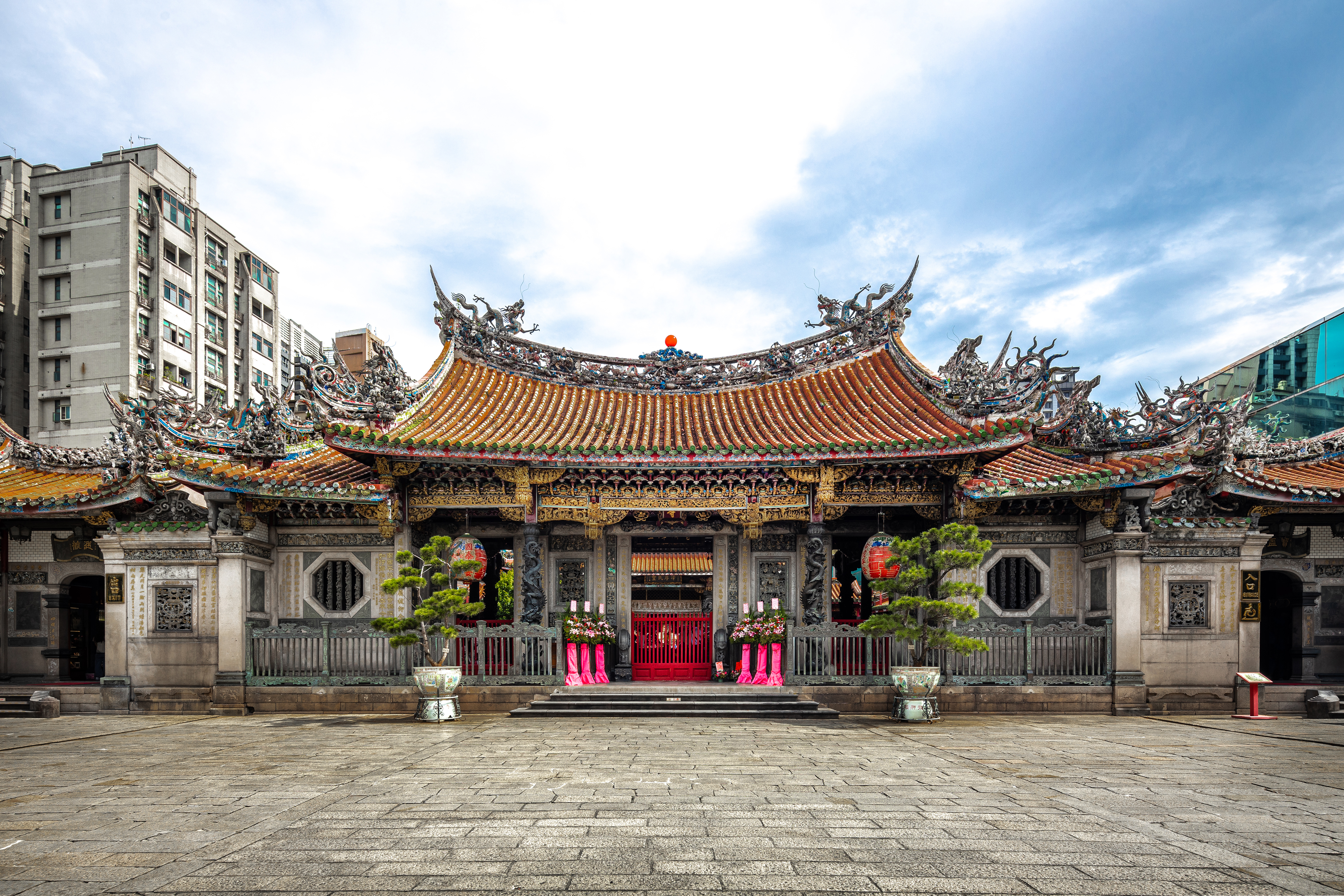
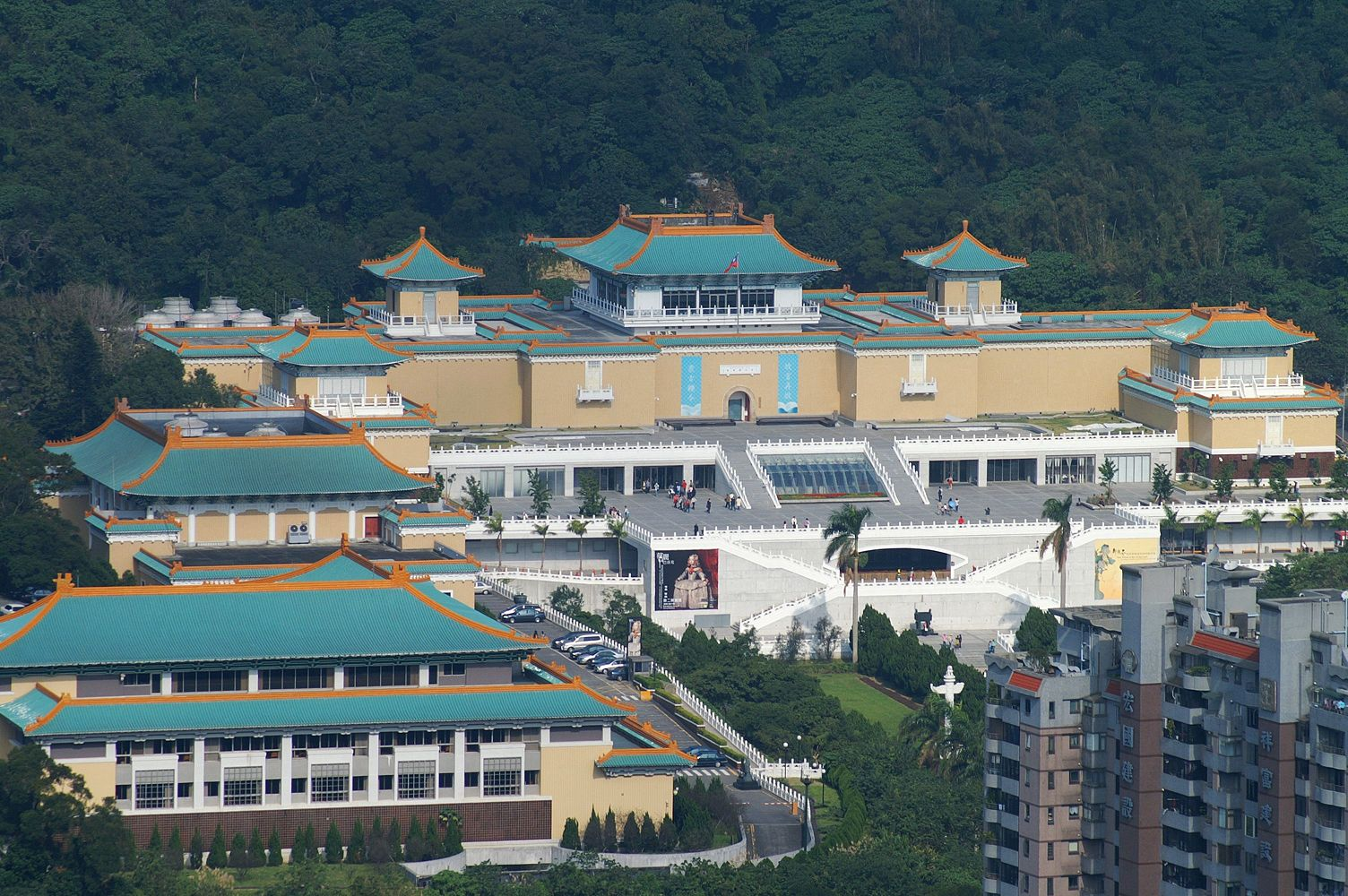
- Skyline of Taipei from Elephant Mountain with Taipei 101 (left) Ximending Presidential Office Yangmingshan National Park Bangka Lungshan Temple National Palace Museum

- Flag Logo
- Etymology: Wade–Giles: Tʻai²-pei³; lit. 'North of Taiwan'
- Nickname(s): The City of Azaleas
- Location within Taiwan Location within Asia Location within Pacific Ocean Location within Earth
- Country: Republic of China (Taiwan)
- Settled: 1709
- Taipeh Prefecture: 1875
- Renamed Taihoku: 17 April 1895
- Provincial city status: 25 October 1945
- Provisional national capital: 7 December 1949
- Reconstituted as a Yuan-controlled municipality: 1 July 1967
- City seat: Xinyi District; 25°02′15″N 121°33′45″E
- Districts: 12
- Largest district: Daan District

Government
  - Mayor: Chiang Wan-an (KMT)
- Legislature: Taipei City Council

National representation
  - Legislative Yuan: 8 of 113 constituencies

Area
  - Total: 271.80 km^{2} (104.94 sq mi) (16th)

Population
  - March 2023 estimate: 2,494,813 (4th) 9,078,000 (urban) (4th)
- GDP (PPP): 2016 estimate
  - Total: $65,539 (1st)
- GDP (nominal): 2016 estimate
  - Total: NT$990,292 (1st)
- Time zone: UTC+8 (National Standard Time)
- Calling code: (0)2
- Postal code: 100–116
- ISO 3166 code: TW-TPE
- Climate: Humid subtropical climate (Cfa)
- Website: gov.taipei; en.gov.taipei
- Symbols
- Bird: Formosan blue magpie (Urocissa caerulea)
- Flower: Azalea (Rhododendron nudiflorum)
- Tree: Banyan (India laurel fig, Ficus microcarpa)

Taipei
- Traditional Chinese: 臺北市 or 台北市
- Simplified Chinese: 台北市
- Literal meaning: "Northern Tai(wan)"
Transcriptions
Standard Mandarin
- Hanyu Pinyin: Táiběi Shì
- Bopomofo: ㄊㄞˊ ㄅㄟˇ ㄕˋ
- Gwoyeu Romatzyh: Tairbeei Shyh
- Wade–Giles: Tʻai^{2}-pei^{3} Shih^{4}
- Tongyong Pinyin: Táiběi Shìh
- Yale Romanization: Táiběi Shr̀
- MPS2: Táiběi Shr̀
- IPA: [tʰǎɪ.pèɪ ʂɻ̩̂]
other Mandarin
- Xiao'erjing: تَےْبَےْ شِ
Wu
- Suzhounese: De^{2}-poq^{7}
Hakka
- Pha̍k-fa-sṳ: Thòi-pet-sṳ
Yue: Cantonese
- Yale Romanization: Tòihbāk Síh
- Jyutping: Toi4bak1 Si5
- IPA: [tʰɔj˩.pɐk̚˥ si˩˧]
Southern Min
- Hokkien POJ: Tâi-pak-chhī
- Tâi-lô: Tâi-pak-tshī
Eastern Min
- Fuzhou BUC: Dài-báe̤k chê

Taipei (/ˌtaɪˈpeɪ/), (Note: In local languages: Traditional Chinese script: 臺北; Mandarin Pinyin: Táiběi; Hokkien: Tâi-pak) officially Taipei City, is the capital (Note: The Constitution of the Republic of China does not stipulate any city, including Taipei or its pre-1949 capital, Nanjing, as the de jure capital of the Republic of China. However, Taipei has been designated the official seat of central government by a decree, thus making it the de facto capital. Despite having no actual control, the People's Republic of China considers Taipei to be the capital of its claimed Taiwan Province.) and a special municipality of Taiwan. Located in Northern Taiwan, Taipei City is an enclave of the municipality of New Taipei City that sits about 25 kilometres (16 mi) southwest of the northern port city of Keelung. Most of the city rests on the Taipei Basin, an ancient lakebed. The basin is bounded by the relatively narrow valleys of the Keelung and Xindian rivers, which join to form the Tamsui River along the city's western border.

The municipality of Taipei is home to an estimated population of 2,494,813 (March 2023), forming the core part of the Taipei–Keelung metropolitan area, also known as "Greater Taipei", which includes the nearby cities of New Taipei and Keelung with a population of 7,047,559, the 40th most-populous urban area in the world—roughly one-third of Taiwanese citizens live in the metro areas. The name "Taipei" can refer either to the whole metropolitan area or just the municipality alone. Taipei has been the political center of the island since 1887, when it first became the seat of Taiwan Province by the Qing dynasty until 1895 and again from 1945 to 1956 by the Republic of China (ROC) government, (Note: The Taiwan Provincial Government subsequently moved to Zhongxing New Village in Nantou County until it was dissolved in 2018.) with an interregnum from 1895 to 1945 as the seat of the Government-General of Taiwan during the Japanese rule. The city has been the national seat of the ROC central government since 1949, and it became the nation's first special municipality (then known as Yuan-controlled municipality) on 1 July 1967, upgrading from provincial city status.

Taipei is the economic, political, educational and cultural center of Taiwan. It has been rated an "Alpha − City" by GaWC. Taipei also forms a major part of a high-tech industrial area. Railways, highways, airports and bus lines connect Taipei with all parts of the island. The city is served by two airports – Songshan and Taoyuan. The municipality is home to architectural and cultural landmarks, including Taipei 101 (which was formerly the tallest building in the world), Chiang Kai-shek Memorial Hall, Dalongdong Baoan Temple, Hsing Tian Kong, Lungshan Temple of Manka, National Palace Museum, Presidential Office Building, Taipei Guest House and Zhinan Temple. Shopping districts including Ximending as well as several night markets dispersed throughout the city. Natural features include Maokong, Yangmingshan and hot springs.

In English-language news reports, the name Taipei often serves as a synecdoche referring to the central government that controls the Taiwan Area. Due to the ambiguous political status of Taiwan internationally, the term Chinese Taipei is also frequently used as a synonym for the entire country, as when Taiwan's governmental representatives participate in international organizations or when Taiwan's athletes compete in international sporting events, including the Olympics.

== Names ==
The spellings Taipei and Tʻai-pei derive from the Wade–Giles romanization Tʻai²-pei³ which means the North of Taiwan in Chinese. The name could be also romanized as Táiběi according to Hanyu Pinyin and Tongyong Pinyin.

The city has also been known as Tai-pak (derived from Taiwanese Hokkien) and Taipeh.

During the Japanese rule from 1895 to 1945, Taipei was known as Taihoku, which is the pronunciation of the Chinese characters (Kanji: 台北) for Taipei in Japanese.

== History ==
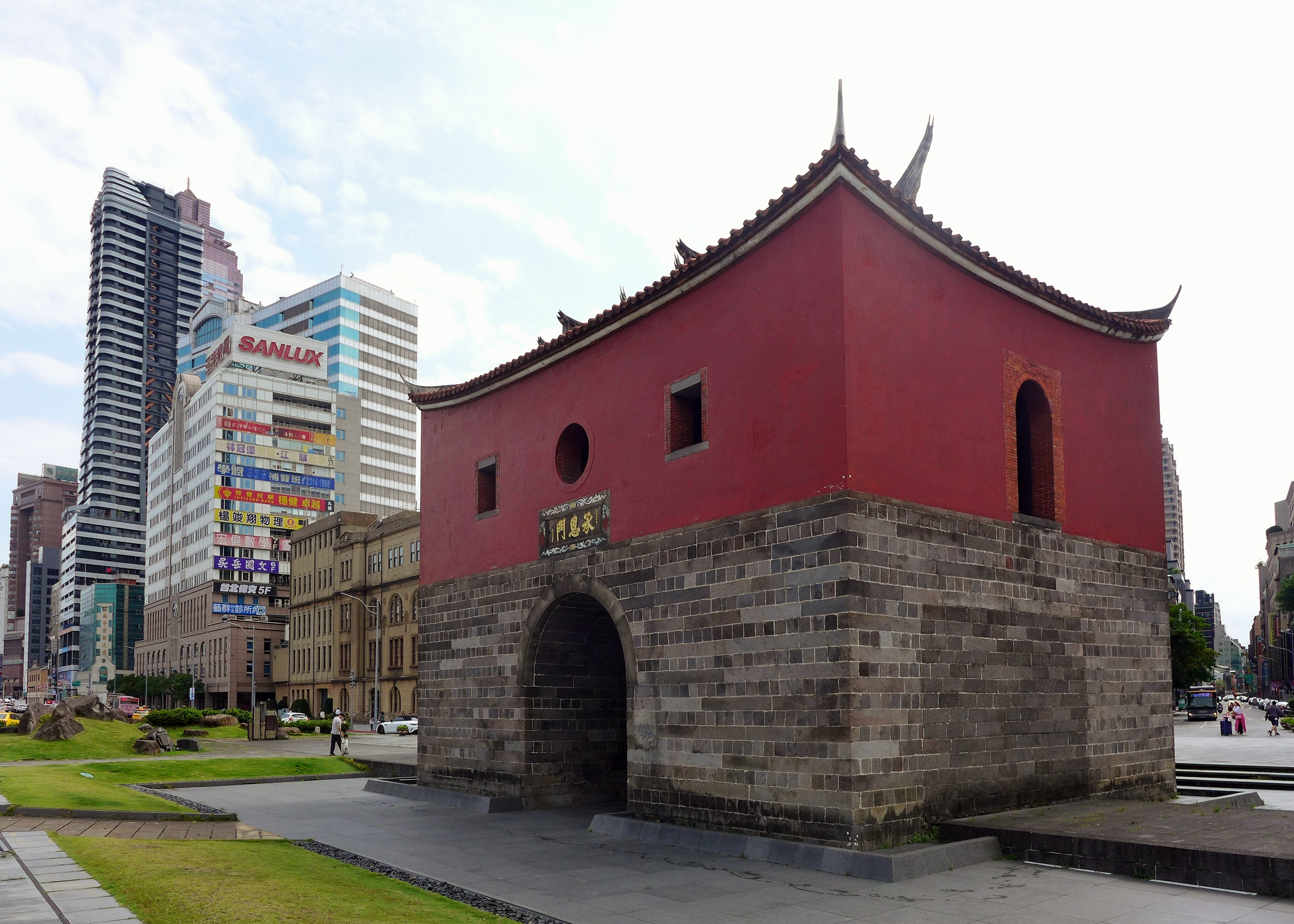
Taipei's Old North Gate, completed in 1884

Prior to the significant influx of Han Chinese colonists, the region of Taipei Basin was mainly inhabited by the Ketagalan, a Plains Indigenous people. The number of Han colonists gradually increased in the early 18th century under Qing dynasty rule after the government began permitting development in the area. In 1875, the northern part of the island was incorporated into the new Taipeh Prefecture.

It was formerly established as Taipeh-fu and was the temporary capital of the island in 1887 when it was declared a province (Fukien-Taiwan Province). Taipeh was formally made the provincial capital in 1894. The romanized transcription of Taipeh was changed to Taihoku in 1895 when the Empire of Japan annexed Taiwan, based on the Japanese reading of the two characters. The writing in Chinese characters remained unaltered. Under Japanese rule, the city was administered under Taihoku Prefecture. Taiwan's Japanese rulers embarked on an extensive program of advanced urban planning that featured extensive railroad links. A number of Taipei landmarks and cultural institutions date from this period.

Following the surrender of Japan to the Allies during 1945, effective control of Taiwan was handed to the Republic of China (ROC). After facing defeat from Communist forces, the ruling Kuomintang relocated the ROC government to Taiwan and declared Taipei the provisional capital of the ROC in December 1949. Taiwan's Kuomintang rulers regarded the city as the capital of Taiwan Province and their control as mandated by General Order No. 1.

In 1990, Taipei provided the backdrop for the Wild Lily student rallies that moved Taiwanese society from one-party rule to multi-party democracy by 1996. The city has served as the seat of Taiwan's democratically elected national government ever since.

=== Early settlers to the Qing dynasty ===
Prior to the 18th century, the region known as the Taipei Basin was home to Ketagalan tribes. Han Chinese colonists from Dabu County, Yongding County, Anxi and Tong'an of Southern Fujian began to settle in the Taipei Basin in 1709.

In the late 19th century, the Taipei area, where the major Han Chinese settlements in northern Taiwan and one of the designated overseas trade ports, Tamsui, were located, gained economic importance due to the booming overseas trade, especially that of tea export. In 1875, the northern part of Taiwan was separated from Taiwan Prefecture and incorporated into the new Taipeh Prefecture as a new administrative entity of the Qing dynasty. Having been established adjoining the flourishing townships of Bangka, Dalongdong, and Twatutia, the new prefectural capital was known as Chengnei (Chinese: 城內; pinyin: chéngnèi; Pe̍h-ōe-jī: siâⁿ-lāi), "the inner city", and government buildings were erected there. From 1875 until the beginning of Japanese rule in 1895, Taipei was part of Tamsui County of Taipeh Prefecture and the prefectural capital.

In 1886, as work commenced to govern the island as a province, Taipeh was designated as the provincial capital. When Japan acquired the island in 1895 as part of the peace agreement for the First Sino-Japanese War, they retained Taipeh as the capital.

Nowadays, all that remains from the historical period is the north gate. The west gate and city walls were demolished by the Japanese while the south gate, little south gate, and east gate were extensively modified by the Kuomintang and have lost much of their original character.

=== Empire of Japan ===
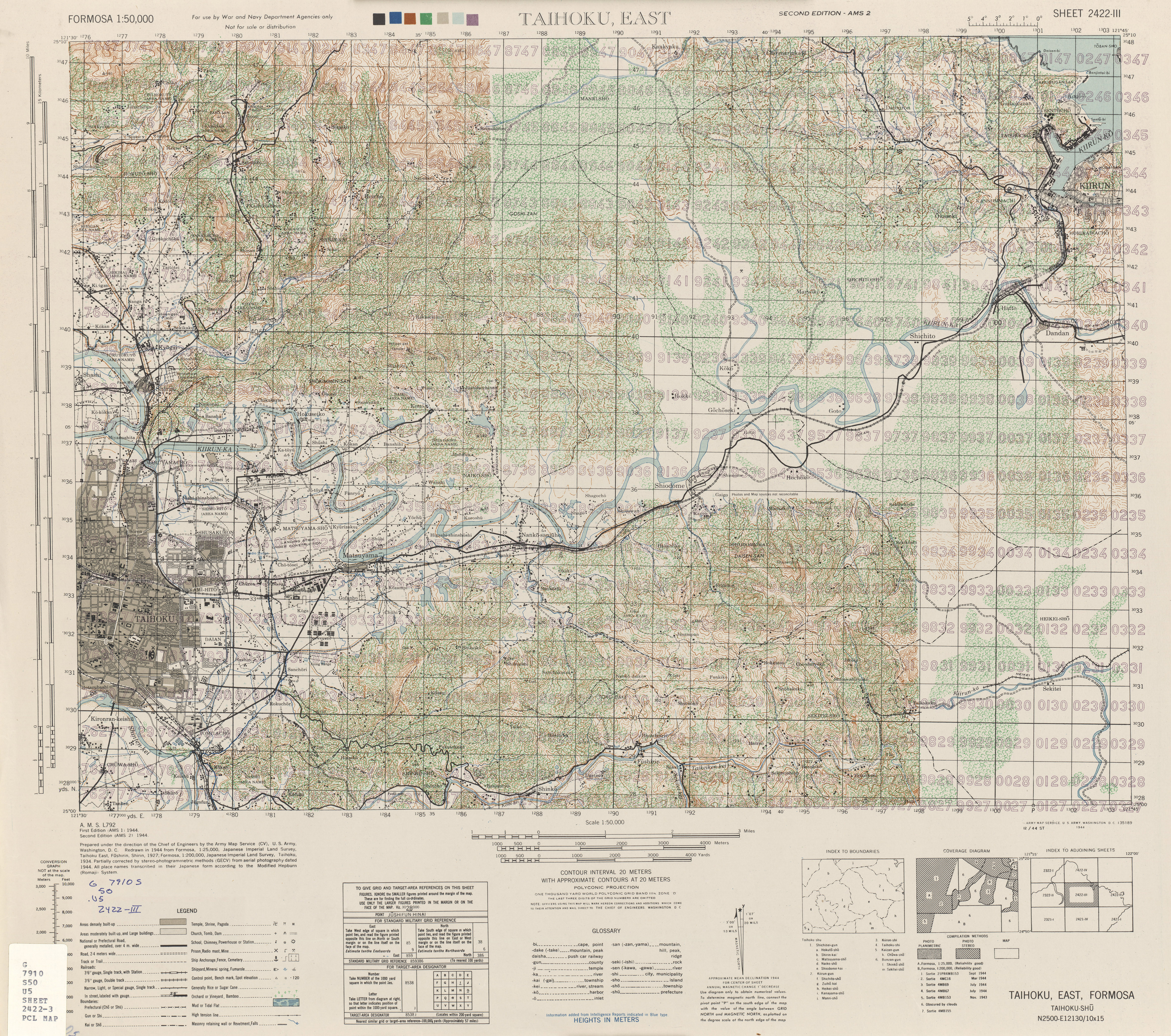
Map of eastern Taipei (labeled as TAIHOKU) and nearby areas (AMS, 1944)

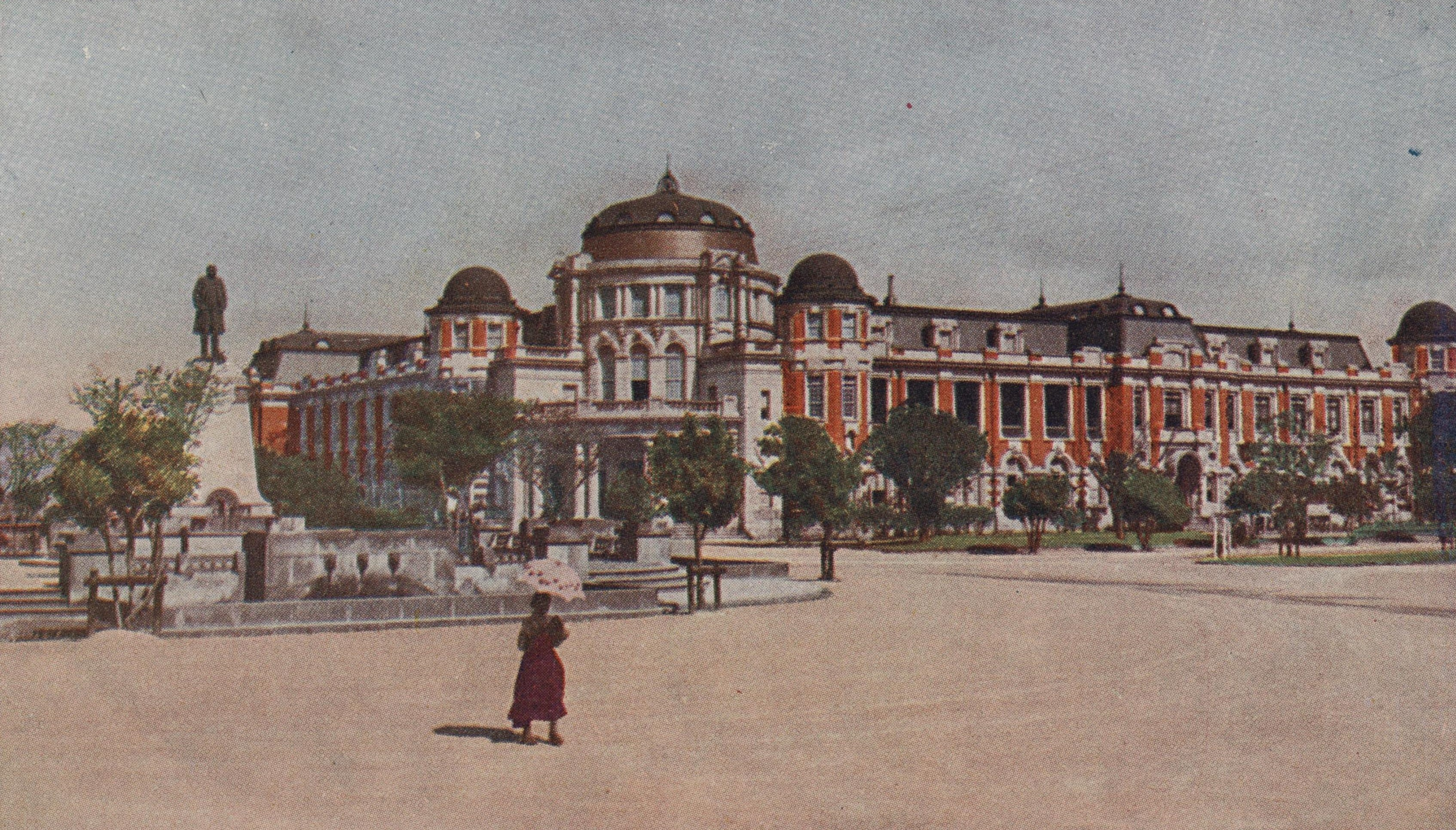
The Taihoku Prefecture government building in the 1920s (now the Control Yuan building)

As settlement for losing the First Sino-Japanese War, China ceded the island of Taiwan to the Empire of Japan in 1895 as part of the Treaty of Shimonoseki. After the Japanese takeover, Taipei, romanized into English as Taihoku following the Japanese language pronunciation, was retained as the capital. It subsequently emerged as the political center of the Japanese Colonial Government. During that time the city acquired the characteristics of an administrative center, including many new public buildings and housing for civil servants. Much of the architecture of Taipei dates from the period of Japanese rule, including the Presidential Office Building which was the Office of the Governor-General of Taiwan.

During Japanese rule, Taihoku was incorporated in 1920 as part of Taihoku Prefecture. It included Bangka, Twatutia, and Jōnai (城內) among other small settlements. The eastern village of Matsuyama (松山庄; modern-day Songshan District, Taipei) was annexed into Taihoku City in 1938. Taihoku and surrounding areas were bombed by Allied forces on several occasions. The largest of these Allied air raids, the Taihoku Air Raid, took place on 31 May 1945.

=== Post-WW2 under ROC ===
Taipei 101 is a landmark and tourist attraction in Taipei.

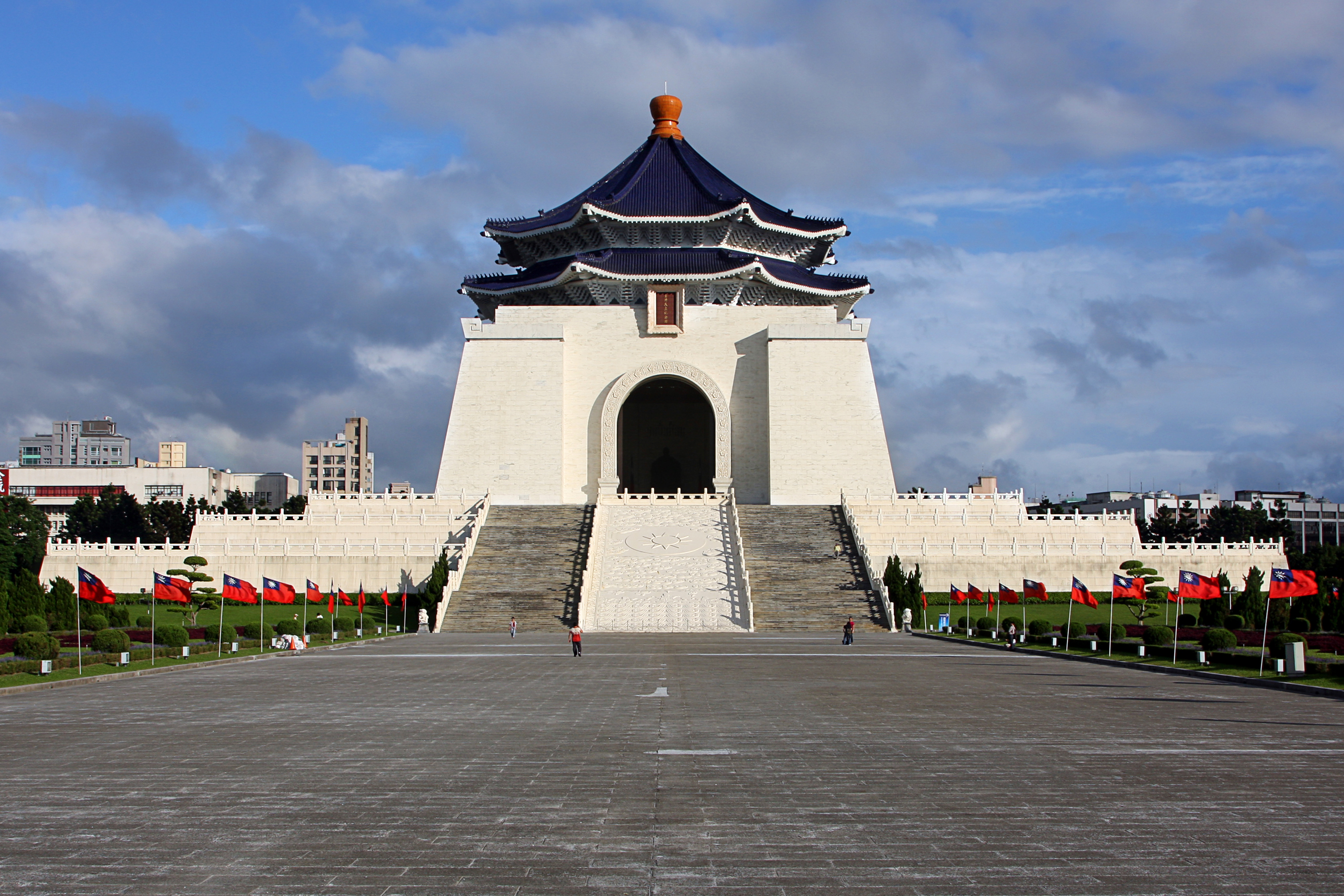
The National Chiang Kai-shek Memorial Hall is a national monument, landmark, and tourist attraction in Taipei.

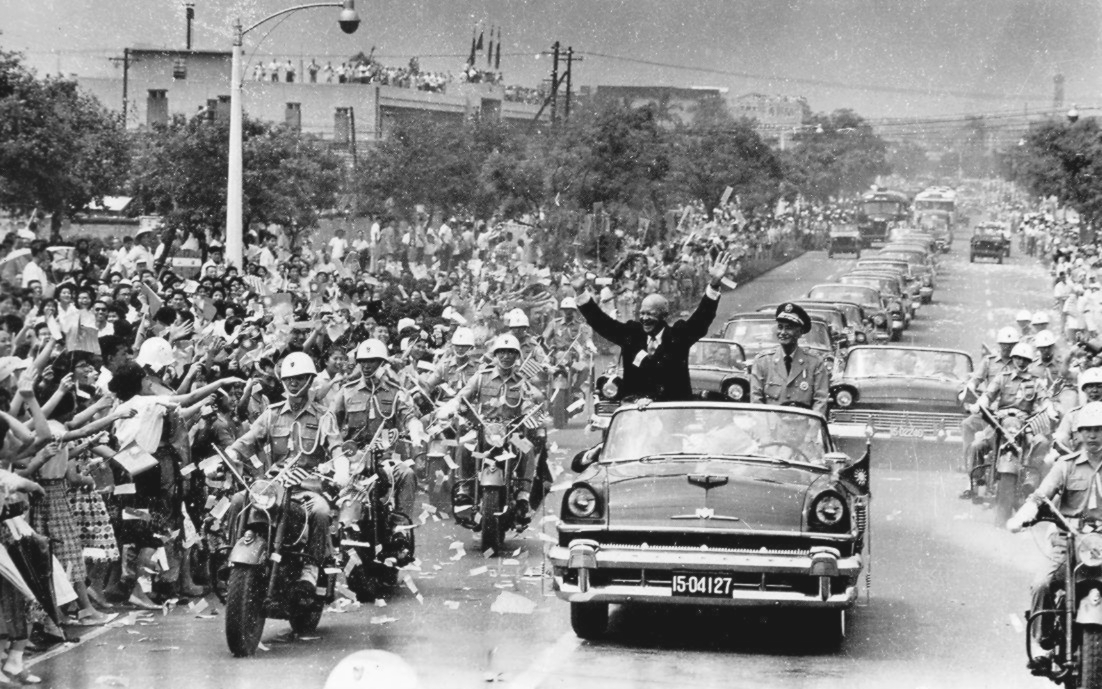
With President Chiang Kai-shek, U.S. President Dwight D. Eisenhower waved to a crowd during his visit to Taipei in June 1960.

Upon the Japanese defeat following the nuclear bomb destruction of Hiroshima and Nagasaki, and its consequent surrender in August 1945, the Kuomintang (Chinese Nationalist Party) assumed control of Taiwan. Subsequently, Taipei was established as a provincial city and a temporary Office of the Taiwan Province Administrative Governor was established in it. In 1947 the Kuomintang (KMT) government under Chiang Kai-shek declared island-wide martial law in Taiwan as a result of the 28 February Incident, which began with incidents in Taipei but led to an island-wide crackdown on the local population by forces loyal to Chiang. Two years later, on 7 December 1949, Chiang and the Kuomintang forces were forced to flee mainland China after the defeat by Communist revolutionaries. The KMT-led national government that fled to Taiwan declared Taipei to be the provisional capital of a continuing Republic of China.

Taipei expanded greatly in the decades after 1949, and as approved on 30 December 1966, by the Executive Yuan, Taipei was declared a special municipality on 1 July 1967. In the following year, Taipei City expanded again by annexing Shilin, Beitou, Neihu, Nangang, Jingmei, and Muzha. At that time, the city's total area increased fourfold by absorbing several outlying towns and villages and the population increased to 1.56 million people.

The city's population, which had reached one million in the early 1960s, also expanded rapidly after 1967, exceeding two million by the mid-1970s. Although growth within the city itself gradually slowed thereafter — its population had become relatively stable by the mid-1990s – Taipei remained one of the world's most densely populated urban areas, and the population continued to increase in the region surrounding the city, notably along the corridor between Taipei and Keelung.

In 1990, Taipei's 16 districts were consolidated into the current 12 districts. Mass democracy rallies that year in the plaza around Chiang Kai-shek Memorial Hall led to an island-wide transition to multi-party democracy, where legislators are chosen via regularly scheduled popular elections, during the presidency of Lee Teng-Hui.

== Geography ==
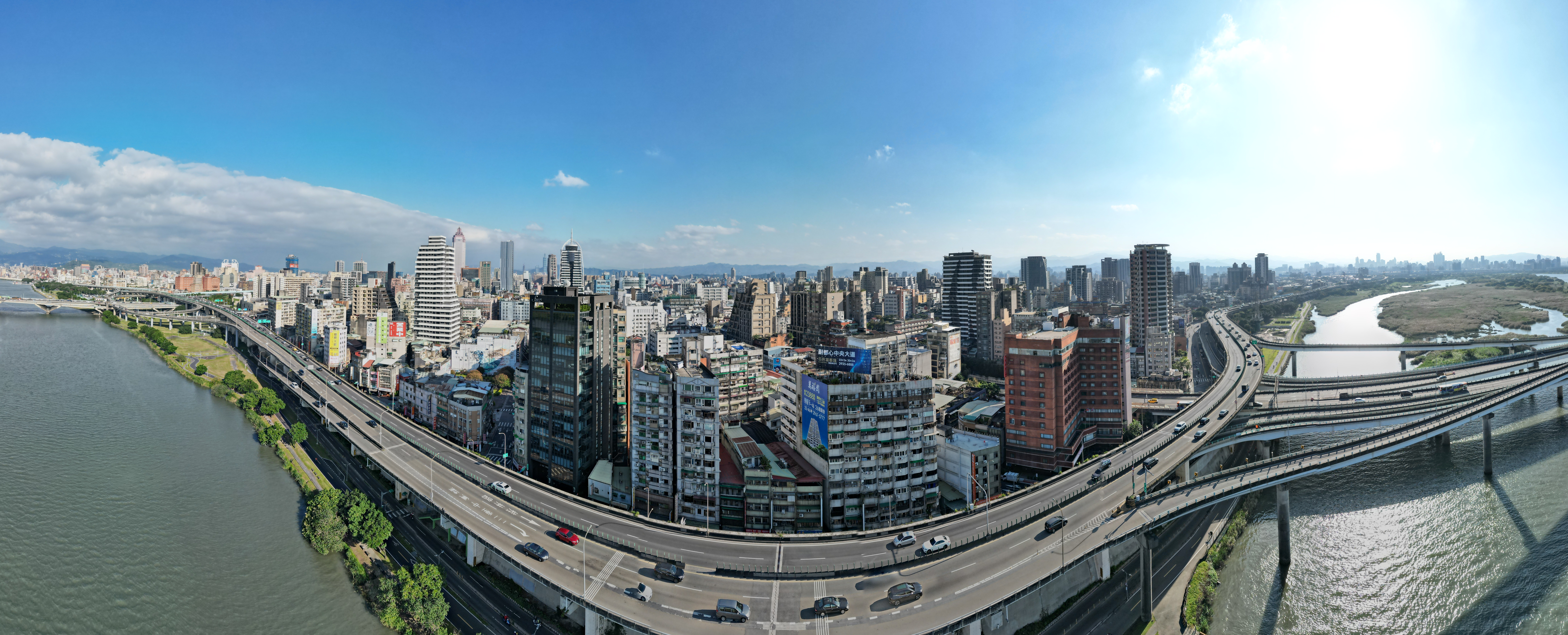
Aerial panorama of Taipei's west from the perspective of Tamsui River

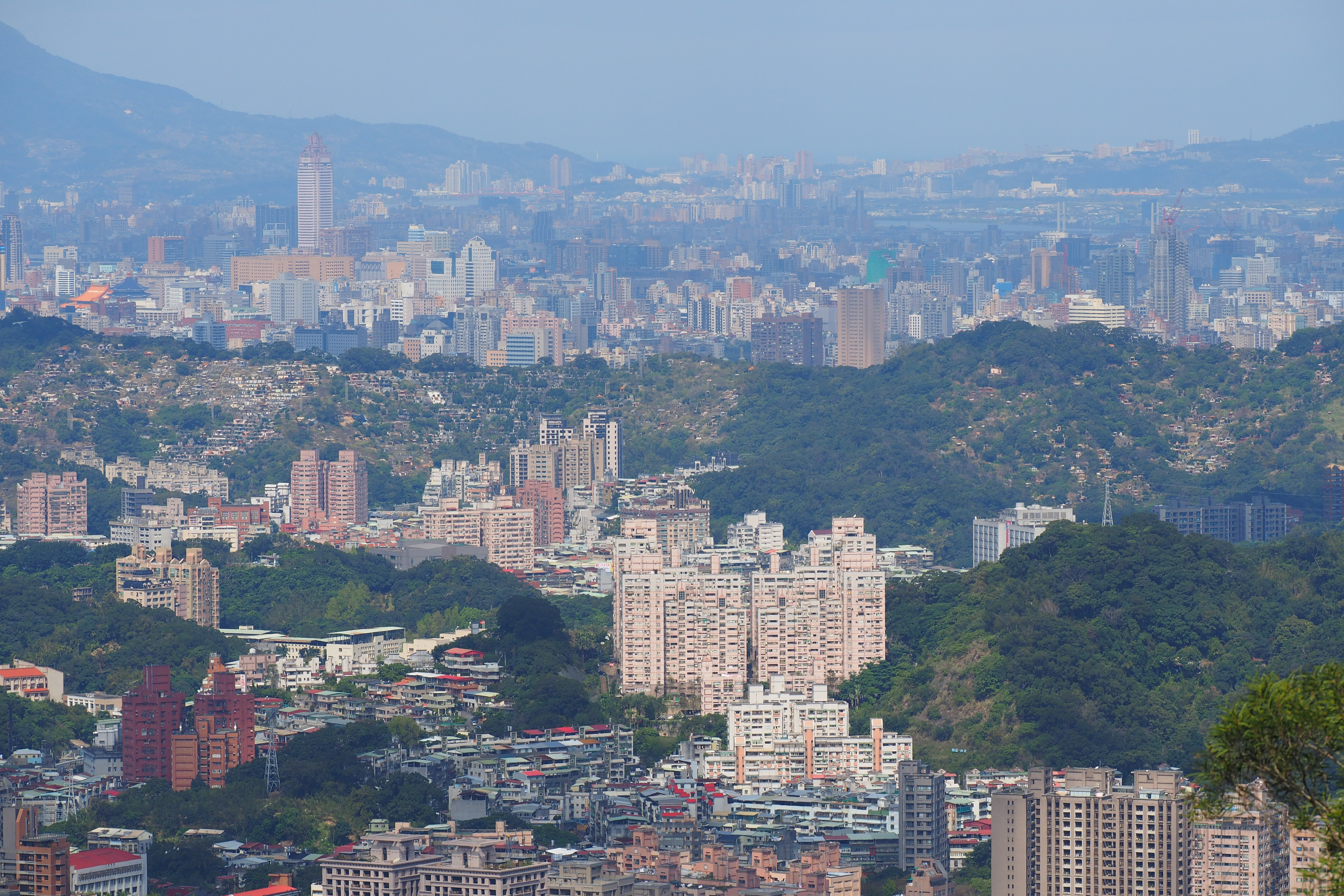
The city of Taipei, as seen from Maokong in 2014

Taipei City is located in the Taipei Basin in northern Taiwan. It is bordered by the Xindian River on the south and the Tamsui River on the west. The generally low-lying terrain of the central areas on the western side of the municipality slopes upward to the south and east and especially to the north, where it reaches the 1,120-meter (3,670 ft)-tall Qixing Mountain, the highest (dormant) volcano in Taiwan in Yangmingshan National Park. The northern districts of Shilin and Beitou extend north of the Keelung River and are bordered by Yangmingshan National Park. The Taipei city limits cover an area of 271.7997 square kilometres (104.9425 sq mi), ranking sixteenth of twenty-five among all counties and cities in Taiwan.

Two peaks, Qixing Mountain and Mt. Datun, rise to the northeast of the city. Qixing Mountain is located on the Tatun Volcanic Group; its 1,120-meter (3,670 ft)-high main peak renders it the tallest mountain at the rim of the Taipei Basin; 1,092-meter (3,583 ft)-high Mt. Datun is a close runner up. These former volcanoes make up the western section of Yangmingshan National Park, extending from Mt. Datun northward to Mt. Caigongkeng (菜公坑山). Located on a broad saddle between two mountains, the area also contains the marshy Datun Pond.

To the southeast of the city lie the Songshan Hills and the Qingshui Ravine, which form a barrier of lush woods.

=== Climate ===
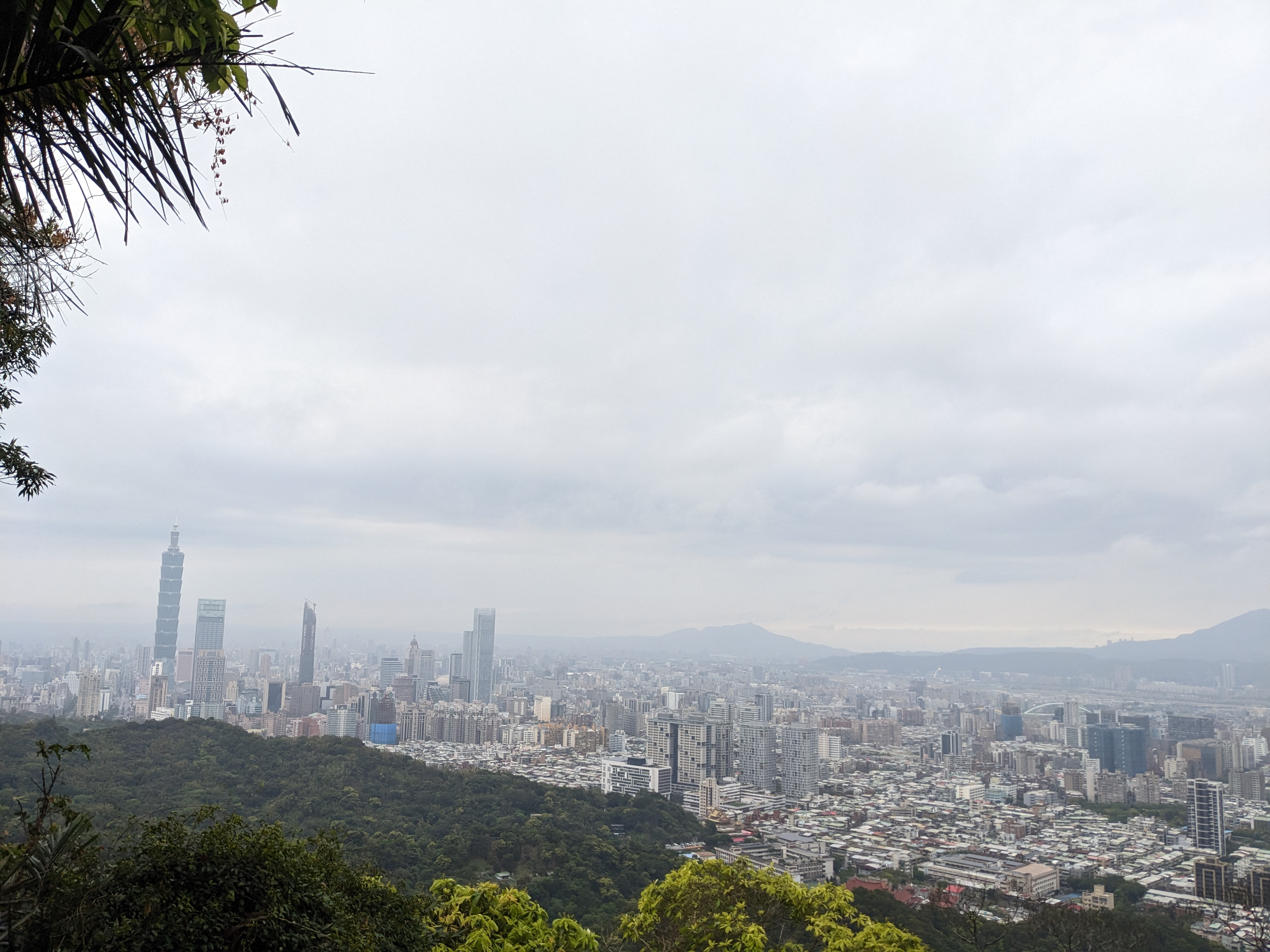
Cloudy day in Taipei

Taipei has a humid subtropical climate (Köppen: Cfa), with slight tropical rainforest climate (Köppen: Af) influences. Summers are long-lasting, very hot and humid, and accompanied by occasional heavy rainstorms and typhoons; while winters are short, generally warm and generally very foggy due to the northeasterly winds from the vast Siberian High being intensified by the pooling of this cooler air in the Taipei Basin. Occasional cold fronts during the winter months can drop the daily temperature below 10°C (50°F). Extreme temperatures ranged from −0.2 °C (31.6 °F) on 13 February 1901 to 39.7 °C (103.5 °F) on 24 July 2020, while snow has never been recorded in the city (Sleet was recorded in January 24, 2016).besides on mountains located within the city limit such as Yangmingshan. Due to Taiwan's location in the Pacific Ocean, it is affected by the Pacific typhoon season, which occurs between June and October.

Climate data for Taipei (1991–2020 normals, extremes 1896–present)
Month	Jan	Feb	Mar	Apr	May	Jun	Jul	Aug	Sep	Oct	Nov	Dec	Year
Record high °C (°F)	31.9 (89.4)	31.8 (89.2)	35.0 (95.0)	36.2 (97.2)	38.3 (100.9)	38.9 (102.0)	39.7 (103.5)	39.3 (102.7)	38.6 (101.5)	36.8 (98.2)	34.3 (93.7)	31.5 (88.7)	39.7 (103.5)
Mean daily maximum °C (°F)	19.4 (66.9)	20.3 (68.5)	22.7 (72.9)	26.4 (79.5)	29.7 (85.5)	32.7 (90.9)	34.8 (94.6)	34.2 (93.6)	31.5 (88.7)	27.6 (81.7)	24.8 (76.6)	21.0 (69.8)	27.1 (80.8)
Daily mean °C (°F)	16.4 (61.5)	16.9 (62.4)	18.8 (65.8)	22.3 (72.1)	25.6 (78.1)	28.2 (82.8)	29.9 (85.8)	29.5 (85.1)	27.7 (81.9)	24.6 (76.3)	21.9 (71.4)	18.2 (64.8)	23.3 (74.0)
Mean daily minimum °C (°F)	14.2 (57.6)	14.4 (57.9)	16.0 (60.8)	19.3 (66.7)	22.6 (72.7)	25.1 (77.2)	26.6 (79.9)	26.4 (79.5)	25.0 (77.0)	22.4 (72.3)	19.7 (67.5)	16.0 (60.8)	20.6 (69.1)
Record low °C (°F)	−0.1 (31.8)	−0.2 (31.6)	1.4 (34.5)	4.7 (40.5)	10.0 (50.0)	15.6 (60.1)	19.5 (67.1)	18.9 (66.0)	13.5 (56.3)	10.2 (50.4)	1.1 (34.0)	1.8 (35.2)	−0.2 (31.6)
Average precipitation mm (inches)	93.8 (3.69)	102.4 (4.03)	107.8 (4.24)	101.4 (3.99)	225.2 (8.87)	234.6 (9.24)	214.2 (8.43)	236.5 (9.31)	236.8 (9.32)	162.6 (6.40)	89.3 (3.52)	96.9 (3.81)	1,901.5 (74.85)
Average precipitation days (≥ 0.1 mm)	13.6	12.0	14.1	14.5	14.5	15.7	11.8	14.6	13.8	12.8	12.5	13.1	163
Average relative humidity (%)	77.2	77.8	76.1	74.9	74.7	75.3	70.2	72.1	73.9	74.4	75.0	75.9	74.8
Mean monthly sunshine hours	76.1	79.3	95.1	96.9	113.6	114.8	176.9	182.8	151.7	114.7	93.3	78.6	1,373.8
Percentage possible sunshine	23	25	26	25	27	28	42	45	41	32	29	24	31
Source: Central Weather Bureau

=== Air quality ===
In comparison to other Asian cities, Taipei has "excellent" capabilities for managing air quality in the city. Its rainy climate, location near the coast, and strong environmental regulations have prevented air pollution from becoming a substantial health issue, at least compared to cities in southeast Asia and industrial China. However, smog is extremely common and there is poor visibility throughout the city after rainless days.

Motor vehicle engine exhaust, particularly from motor scooters, is a source of air pollution in Taipei. There are higher levels of fine particulate matter and polycyclic aromatic hydrocarbons in the mornings because of less air movement; sunlight reduces some pollution.

== Cityscape ==
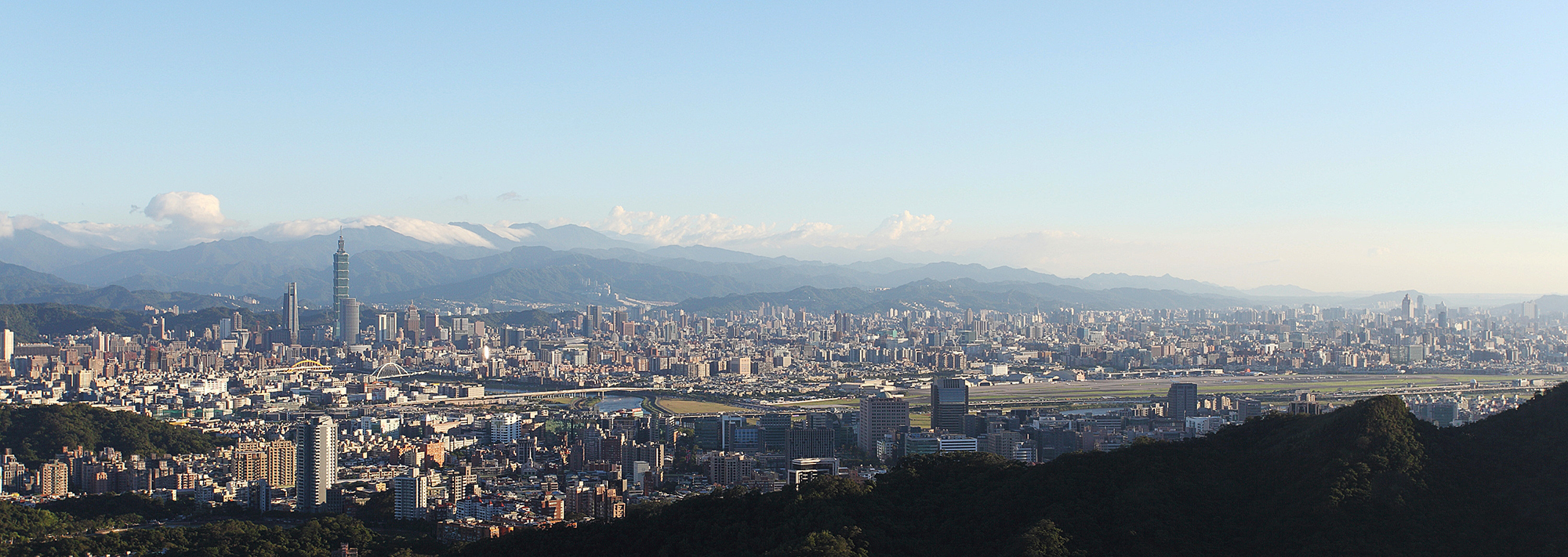
Panoramic view of Taipei's skyline at day
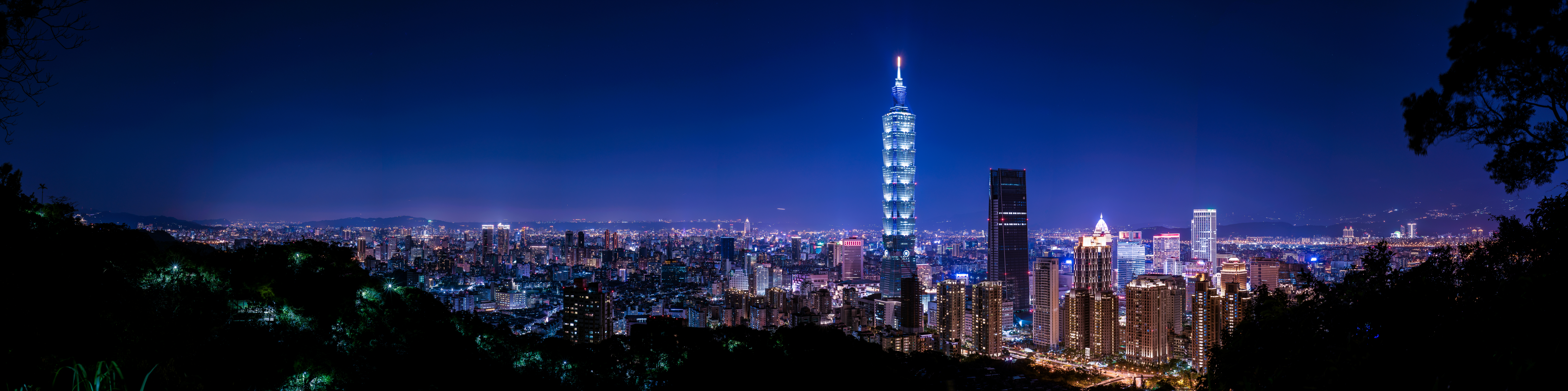
Panoramic view of the skyline of Xinyi Special District (Taipei) skyline at night
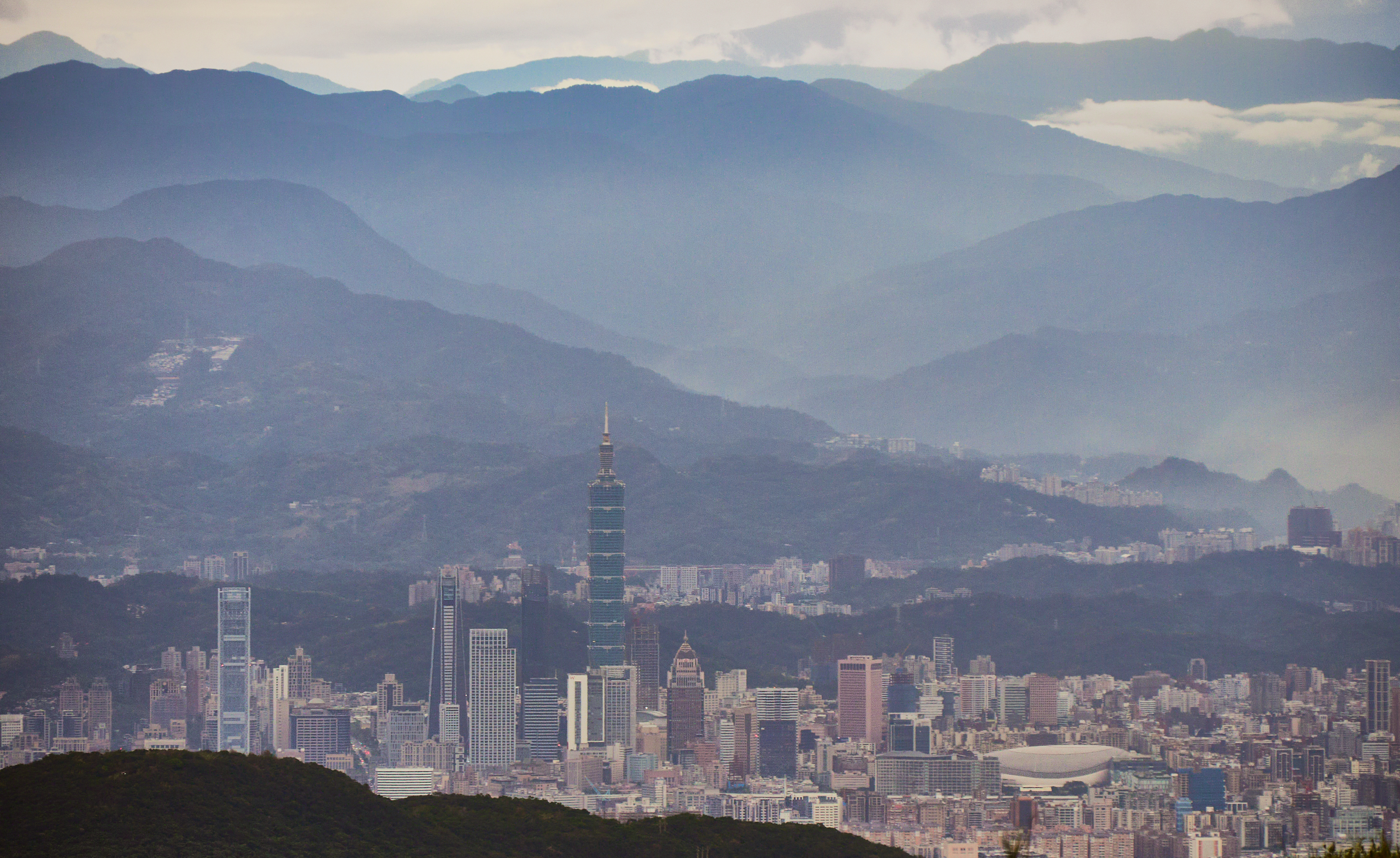
Taipei Basin from Yangmingshan National Park

== Demographics ==
Historical population
Year	Pop.	±%
1875	38,000	—
1905	74,415	+95.8%
1920	162,782	+118.7%
1935	274,157	+68.4%
1958	715,000	+160.8%
1972	1,890,760	+164.4%
1980	2,220,427	+17.4%
1990	2,760,475	+24.3%
2000	2,624,257	−4.9%
2010	2,655,515	+1.2%
2020	2,594,581	−2.3%
Source: 1875 1905–1935 1958 1972 1980 1990–2020

Customers in the Shilin Night Market

While Taipei City is home to 2,524,393 people (2022), the greater metropolitan area has a population of 7,047,559 people. Even though the population of the city has been decreasing in recent years, the population of adjacent New Taipei has been increasing. The population loss, while rapid in its early years, was slowed by lower density development and campaigns designed to increase the birthrate in the city in the 2010s. As a result, the population rose 2010–2015.

Due to Taipei's geography and location in the Taipei Basin as well as differing times of settlement and differing degrees of economic development of its districts, Taipei's population is not evenly distributed. The districts of Daan, Songshan, and Datong are the most densely populated. These districts, along with adjacent communities such as Yonghe and Zhonghe, contain some of the most densely populated neighborhoods in the world.

In 2008, the crude birth rate stood at 7.88%, while the mortality rate stood at 5.94%. A decreasing and rapidly aging population is an important issue for the city. By the end of 2009, one in ten people in Taipei was over 65 years of age. Residents who had obtained a college education or higher accounted for 43.48% of the population, and the literacy rate stood at 99.18%.

Like the rest of Taiwan, Taipei is composed of four major ethnic subgroups: Hoklos, Waishengren, Hakkas, and aborigines. Although Hoklos and Waishengren form the majority of the population of the city, in recent decades many Hakkas have moved into the city. The aboriginal population in the city stands at 16,713 at the end of 2018 (<1%), concentrated mostly in the suburban districts. Foreigners (mainly from Indonesia, the Philippines, and Japan) numbered 71,858 at the end of 2022.

Age distribution	Male	Female	Total
0–4	73,680	69,574	143,250
5–9	57,701	53,004	110,705
10–14	67,345	61,491	128,842
15–19	77,974	72,110	150,084
20–24	78,552	73,103	151,655
25–29	78,447	80,882	159,329
30–34	105,245	118,719	223,964
35–39	107,951	123,852	231,803
40–44	96,222	111,729	207,951
45–49	96,535	112,049	208,584
50–54	98,411	112,322	210,733
55–59	96,092	110,635	206,727
60–64	87,691	100,472	188,163
65–69	55,867	64,949	120,816
70–74	40,087	50,018	90,105
75–79	28,413	39,123	67,536
80–84	23,314	26,760	50,074
85+	26,109	25,887	51,996

View source data.

== Economy ==
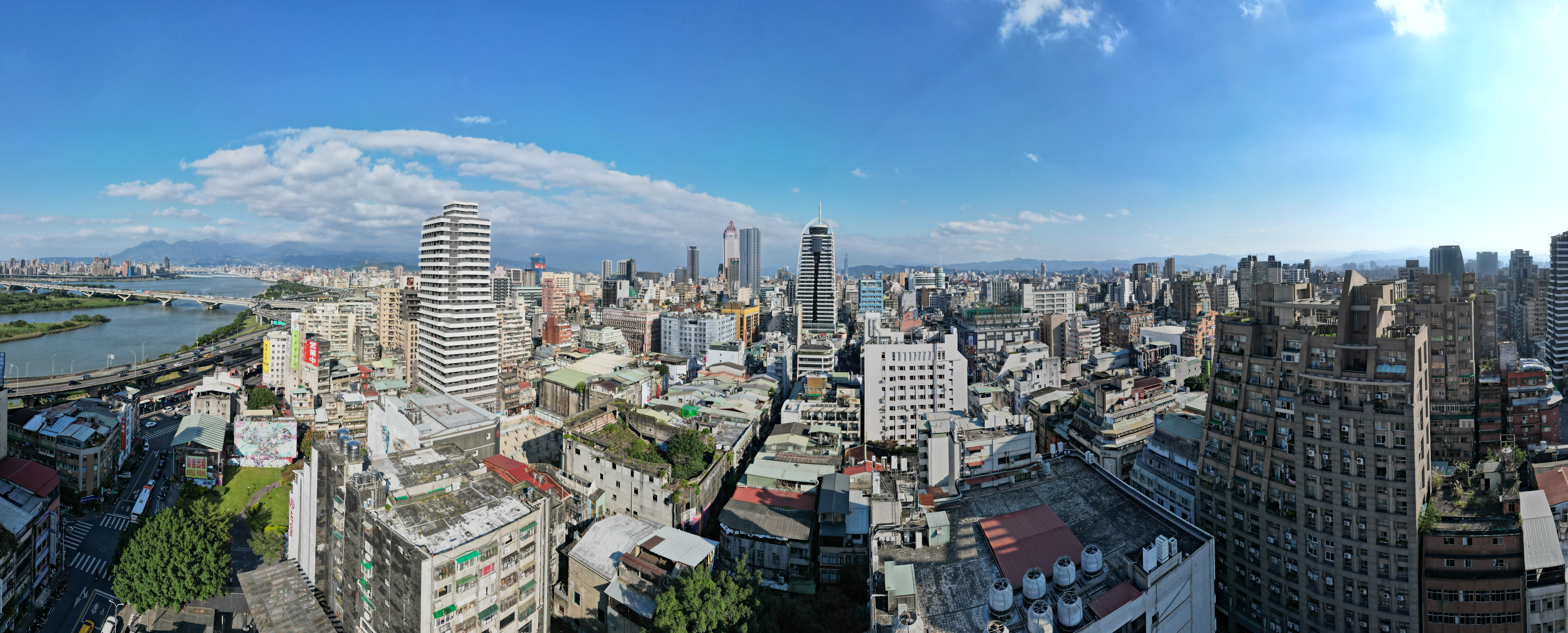
Aerial panorama of Taipei City's west

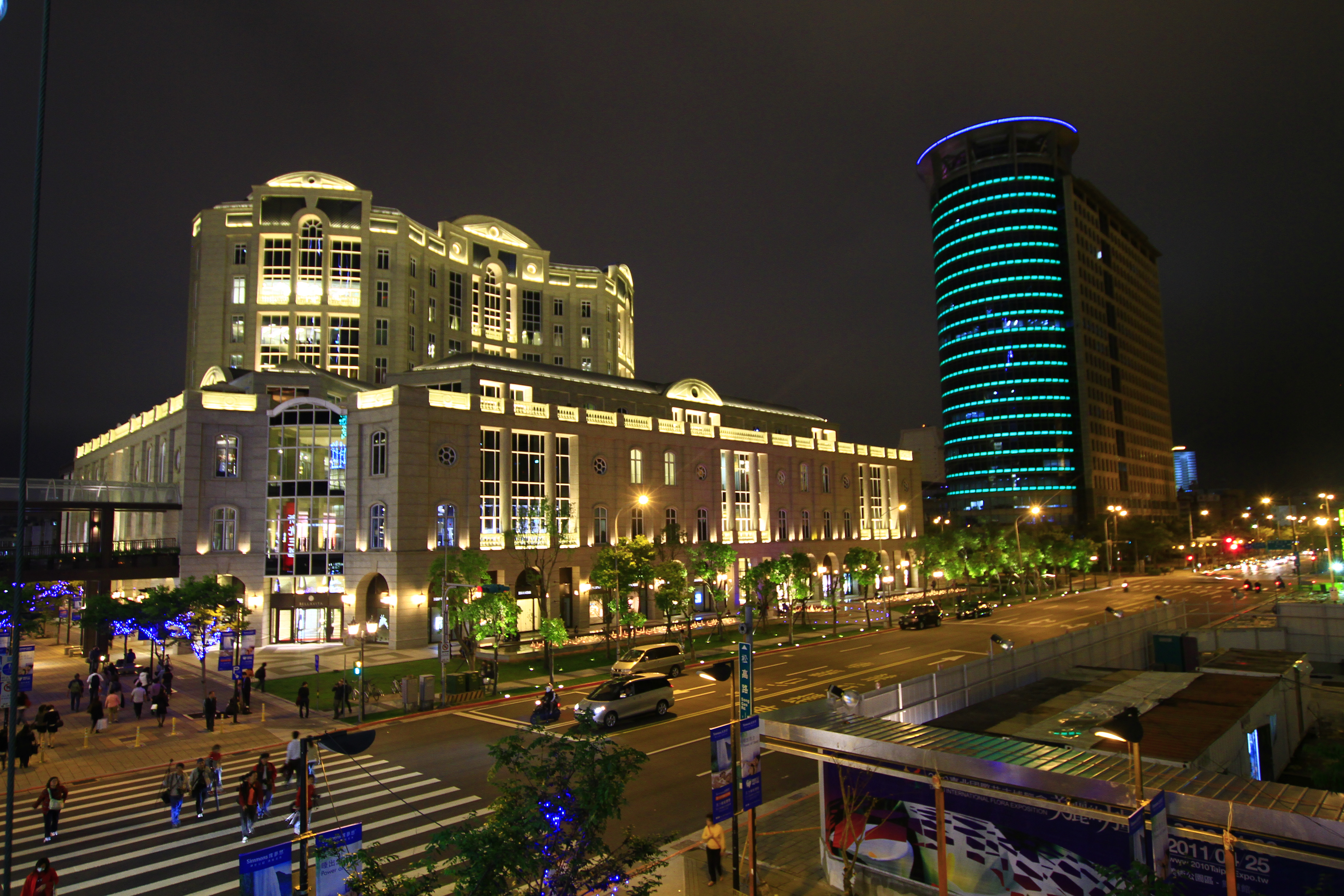
Bellavita Shopping Center and CPC Building at Xinyi Special District

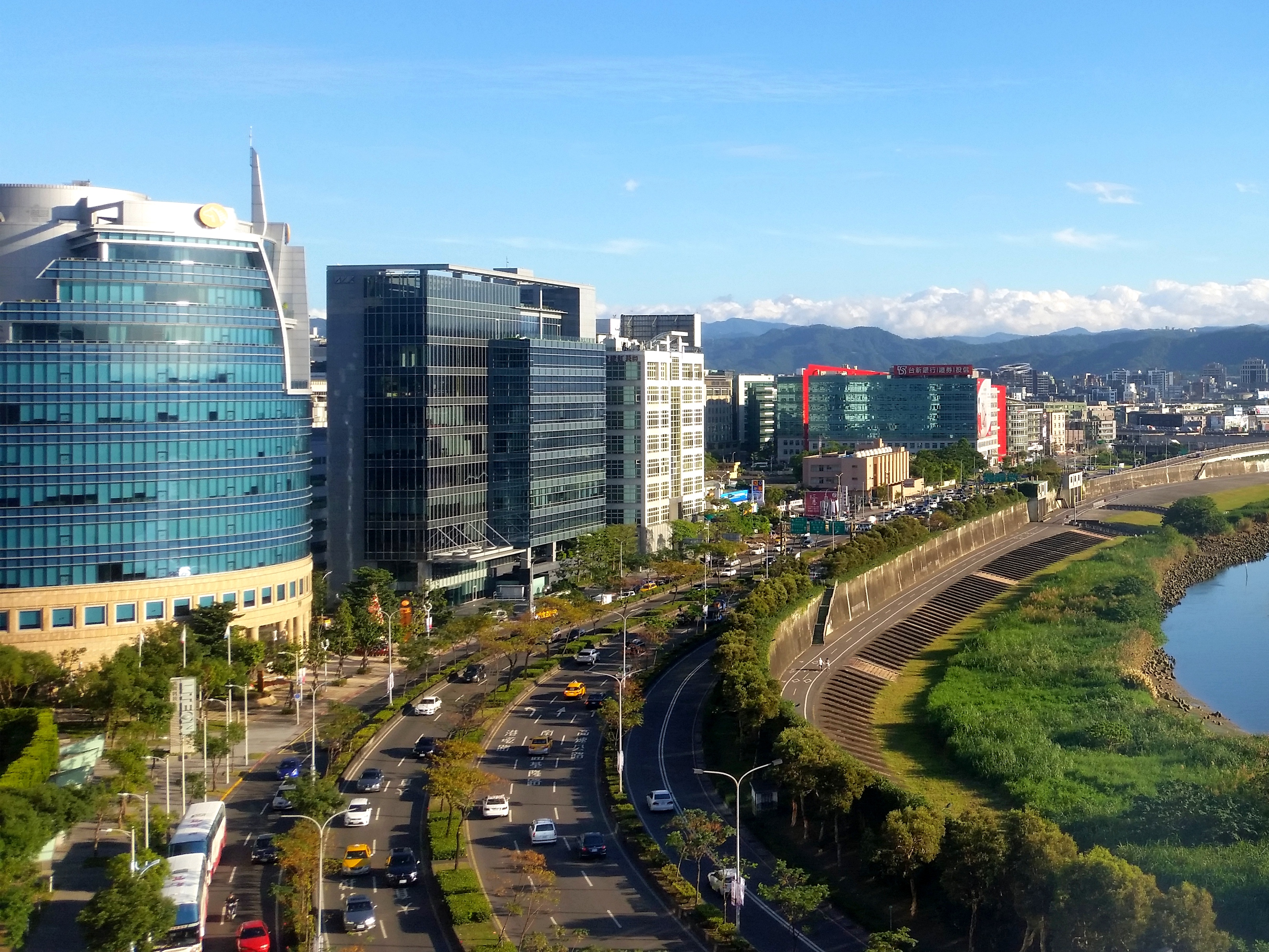
Taipei Neihu Technology Park

As Taiwan's business, financial, and technology hub, Taipei has been at the center of rapid economic development in the country and has now become one of the global cities in technology and electronics. This development is part of the so-called Taiwan Economic Miracle which has seen dramatic growth in the city following foreign direct investment in the 1960s. Taiwan is now a creditor economy, holding one of the world's largest foreign exchange reserves of over US$403 billion as of December 2012.

Despite the Asian financial crisis, the economy continues to expand at about 5% per year, with virtually full employment and low inflation. The city's GDP stand at US$327 billion in 2014. As of 2013, the nominal GDP per capita in Taipei city is 5th highest in East Asia, behind Tokyo, Singapore, Osaka, and Hong Kong, but ahead of Seoul, as well as London and Paris, according to The Economist. GDP per capita based on Purchasing Power Parity (PPP) in Taipei in 2015 was US$44,173, behind that of Singapore (US$90,151 in 2016 from the IMF) and Hong Kong (US$58,322 in 2016 from the IMF; also based on PPP). The Financial Times ranked Taipei highly in economic potential (2nd, behind Tokyo) and business friendliness (4th) in 2015. The city is home to 30 billionaires, the 16th most in the world, ahead of many global cities such as Los Angeles and Sydney. Business Insider also ranks Taipei the 5th most high-tech city globally, the highest in Asia, in 2017. While the IESE Cities in Motion Index 2017 ranks Taipei as the smartest technology city globally.

Taipei's main development fields include the information and communications technology (hardware and software), biotechnology, general merchandizing (wholesale/retail), financial services, and MICE industries. Most of the country's major firms are based there including Acer Computers, Asus, CTBC Bank, Fubon Financial Holding, Tatung Company, D-Link, and others. 5 Global Fortune 500 companies are headquartered in Taipei. The city also attracts many multi-national corporations, international financial institutions, foreign consulates, and business organizations to set up base there. Thus, Taipei has nearly 3,500 registered foreign businesses and attracts over 50% of the total foreign investment in Taiwan. Foreign companies with offices or regional headquarters in Taipei include Google, Microsoft, IBM, Intel, HSBC, Citibank, Facebook, Amazon, Apple, JP Morgan, PwC, and many others. Most financial and foreign firms like to reside in the central business district of Taipei, the Xinyi Special District: Citi, JP Morgan, DBS Bank, Cathay Life Insurance, Shin Kong Commercial Bank, and Hua Nan Bank have all established skyscrapers in the area. Meanwhile, technology and electronics companies are often co-located in the Neihu Technology Park or the Nankang Software Park. The startup and innovation scene in Taipei is also very vibrant. In 2018 alone, Microsoft announced plans to invest US$34 million to create an artificial intelligence R&D center in Taipei, while Google announced it will hire 300 people and train 5,000 more in artificial intelligence for machines. Taipei is Google's biggest engineering site in Asia. IBM also announced in 2018 that it will develop a cloud research lab and expand its R&D center in Taipei with eyes on artificial intelligence, blockchain technology, and cloud computing. According to the 2016 Global Entrepreneurship Development Index, Taipei's entrepreneurial spirit ranks 6th worldwide and 1st in Asia. Taipei has more than 400 startups and numerous incubation centers, accelerators, venture capitals, and angel investors. The city's startup ecosystem is valued at US$580 million by Startup Genome in 2018.

Tourism is a small but significant component of the local economy with international visitors totaling almost 3 million in 2008. Taipei has many top tourist attractions and contributes a significant amount to the US$6.8 billion tourism industry in Taiwan.

== Culture ==
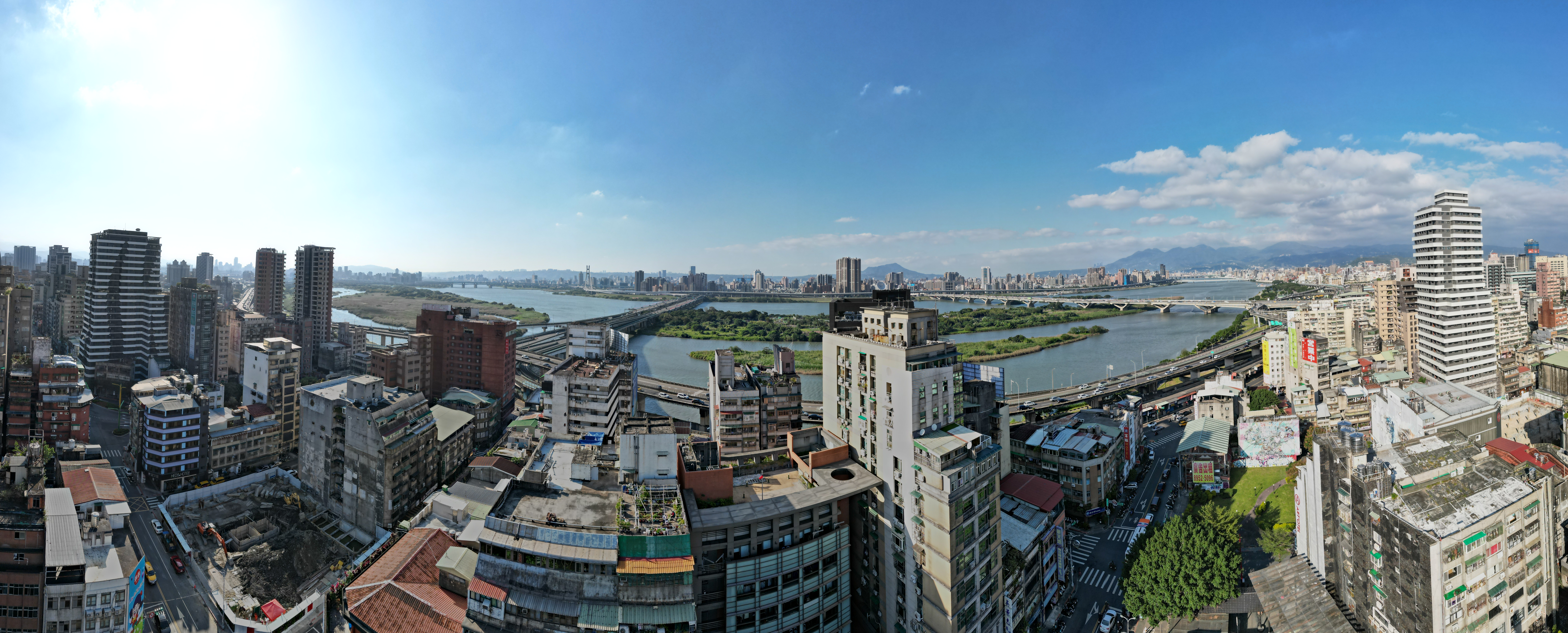
Aerial panorama of Taipei city facing the Tamsui River

=== Tourism ===
Tourism is a major part of Taipei's economy. In 2013, over 6.3 million overseas visitors visited Taipei, making the city the 15th most visited globally. The influx of visitors contributed US$10.8 billion to the city's economy in 2013, the 9th highest in the world and the most of any city in the Chinese-speaking world.

==== Commemorative sites and museums ====
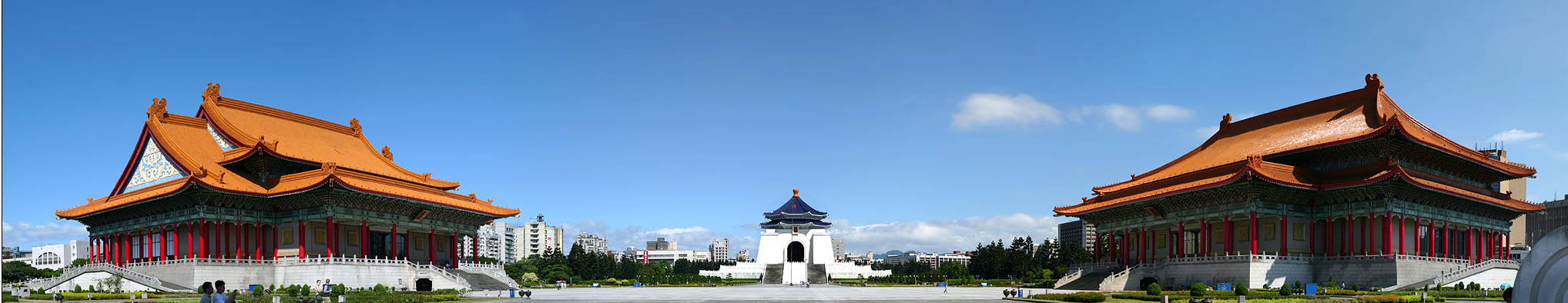
A panorama of the Liberty Square looking east, with the National Concert Hall (left) and the National Theater (right)

The National Palace Museum

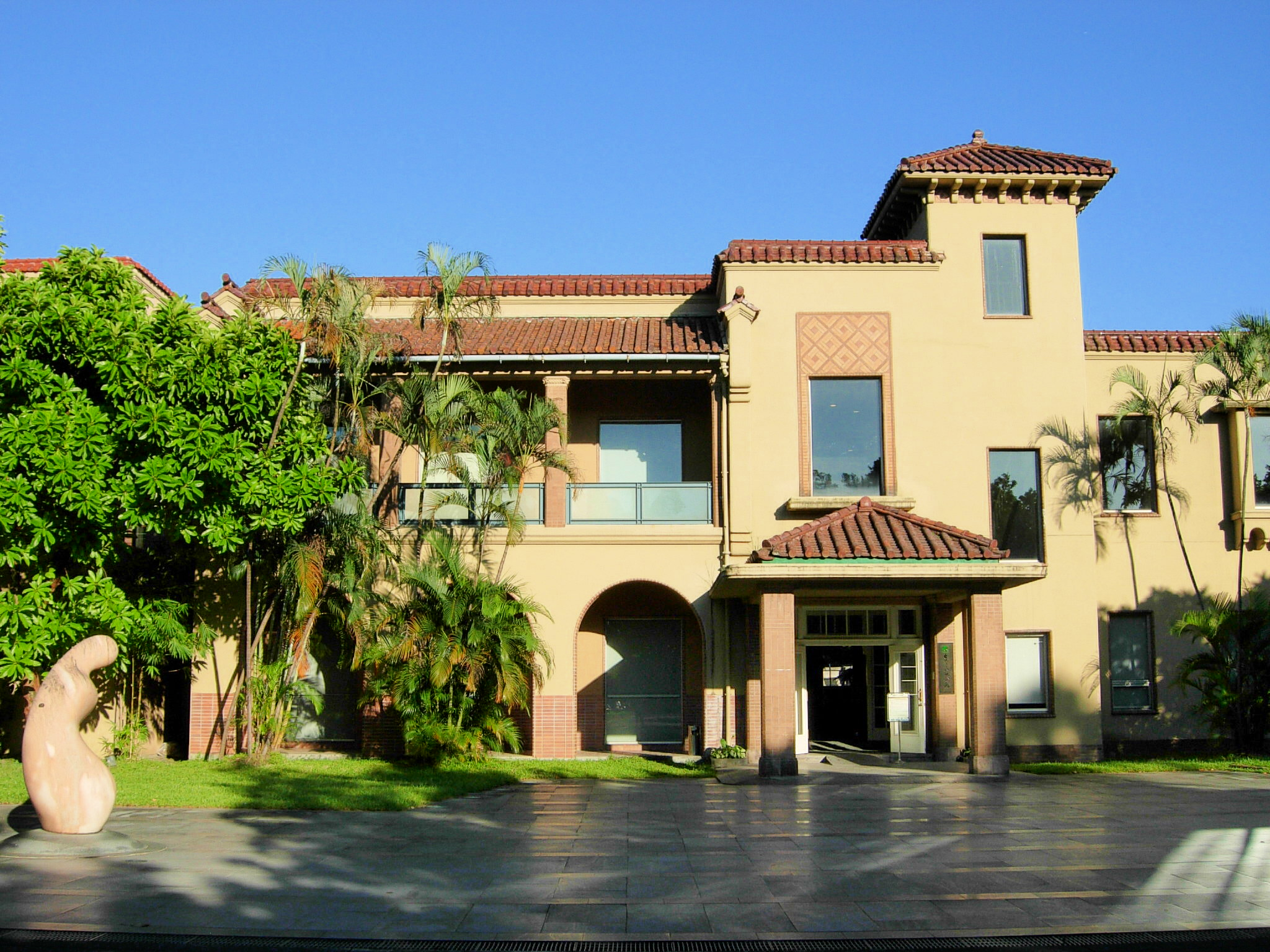
The 228 Memorial Museum

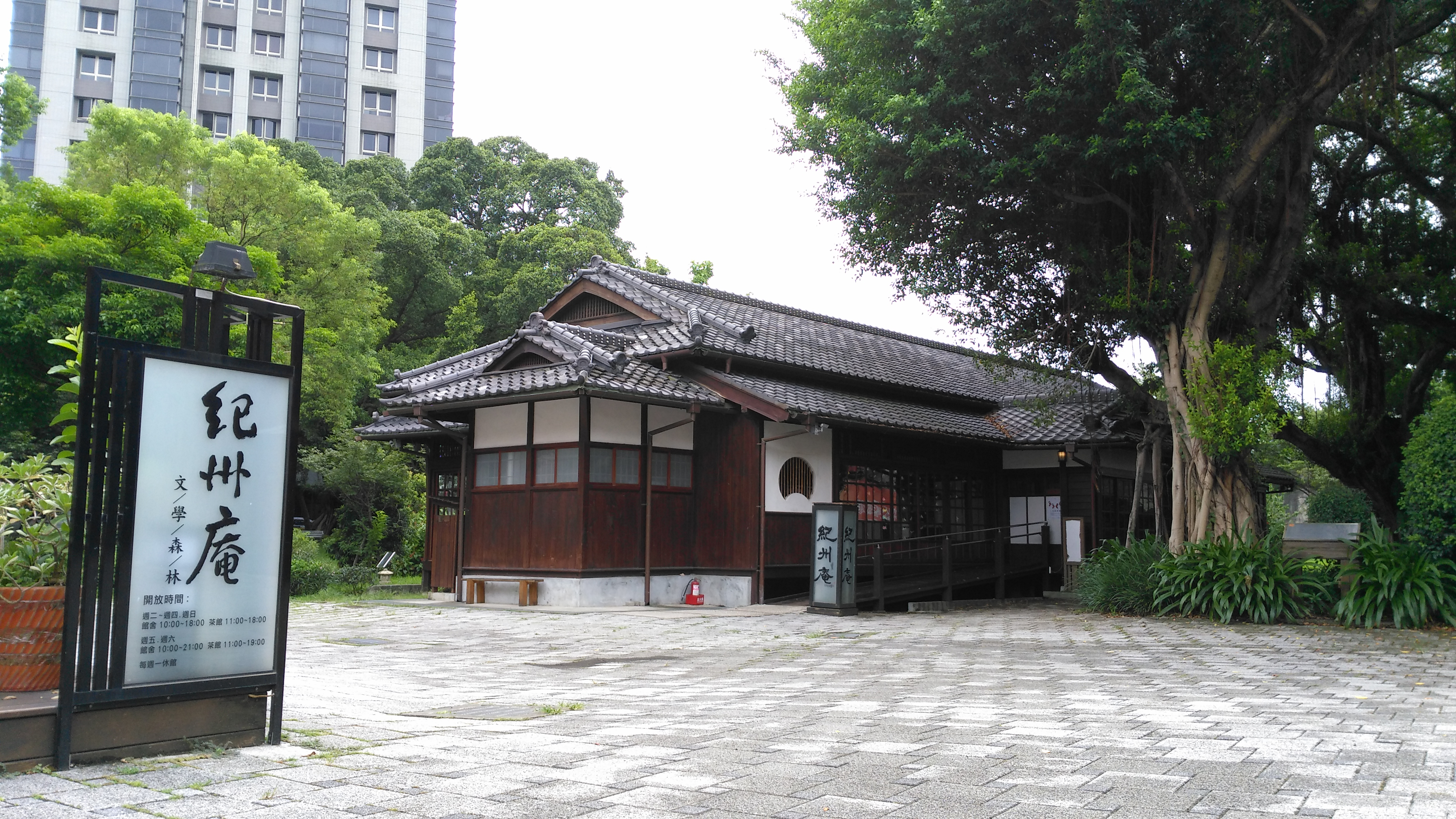
Kishu An Forest of Literature

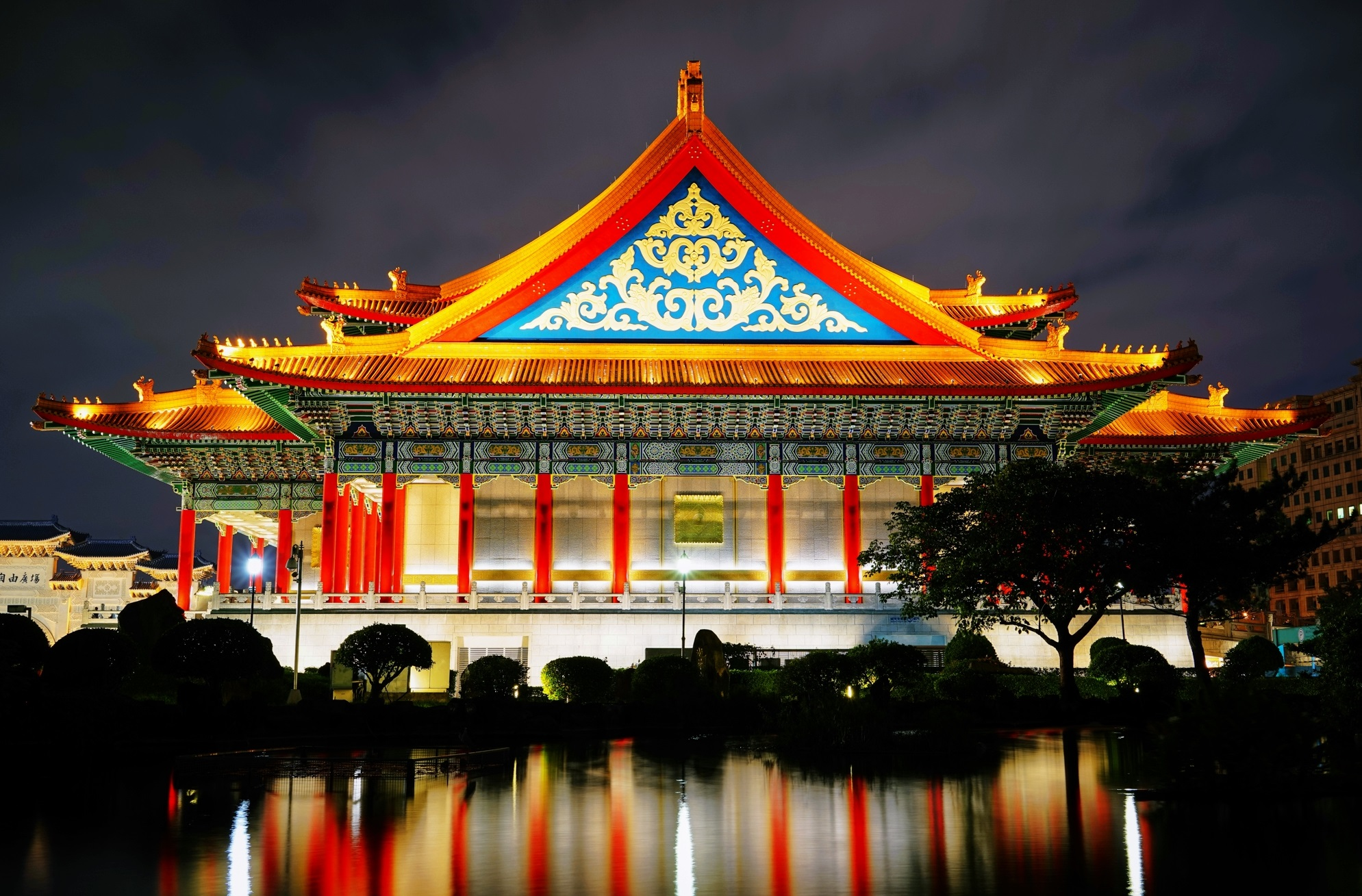
The National Concert Hall illuminated at night

The National Chiang Kai-shek Memorial Hall is a monument, landmark and tourist attraction that was erected in memory of General Chiang Kai-shek, former President of the Republic of China. The structure stands at the east end of Memorial Hall Square, site of the National Concert Hall and National Theater and their adjacent parks as well as the memorial. The landmarks of Liberty Square stand within sight of Taiwan's Presidential Office Building in Taipei's Zhongzheng District.

The National Taiwan Museum

The National Taiwan Museum sits nearby in what is now 228 Peace Memorial Park and has worn its present name since 1999. The museum is Taiwan's oldest, founded on 24 October 1908 by Taiwan's Japanese colonial government (1895–1945) as the Taiwan Governor's Museum. It was launched with a collection of 10,000 items to celebrate the opening of the island's North–South Railway. In 1915 a new museum building opened its doors in what is now 228 Peace Memorial Park. This structure and the adjacent governor's office (now Presidential Office Building), served as the two most recognizable public buildings in Taiwan during its period of Japanese rule.

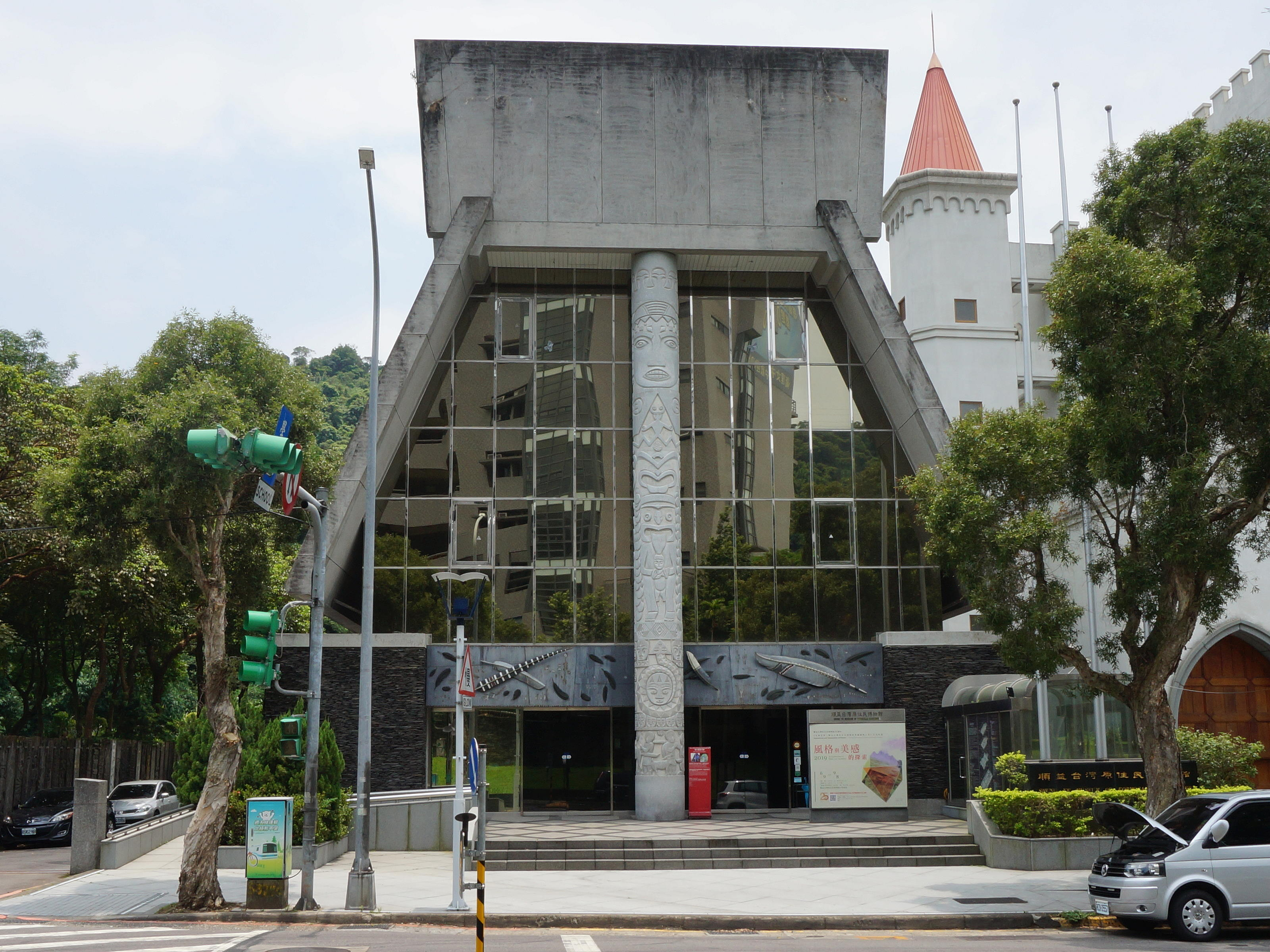
Shung Ye Museum of Formosan Aborigines

The National Palace Museum is a vast art gallery and museum built around a permanent collection centered on ancient Chinese artifacts. It should not be confused with the Palace Museum in Beijing (which it is named after); both institutions trace their origins to the same institution. The collections were divided in the 1940s as a result of the Chinese Civil War. The National Palace Museum in Taipei now boasts a truly international collection while housing one of the world's largest collections of artifacts from ancient China.

The Shung Ye Museum of Formosan Aborigines stands just 200 meters (660 ft) across the road from the National Palace Museum. The museum offers displays of art and historical items by Taiwanese aborigines along with a range of multimedia displays.

The Taipei Fine Arts Museum was established in 1983 as the first museum in Taiwan dedicated to modern art. The museum is housed in a building designed for the purpose that takes inspiration from Japanese designs. Most art in the collection is by Taiwanese artists since 1940. Over 3,000 art works are organized into 13 groups.

The National Sun Yat-sen Memorial Hall near Taipei 101 in Xinyi District is named in honor of a founding father of the Republic of China, Sun Yat-sen. The hall, completed on 16 May 1972, originally featured exhibits that depicted revolutionary events in the Republican period of China. Today it functions as multi-purpose social, educational, concert and cultural center for Taiwan's citizens.

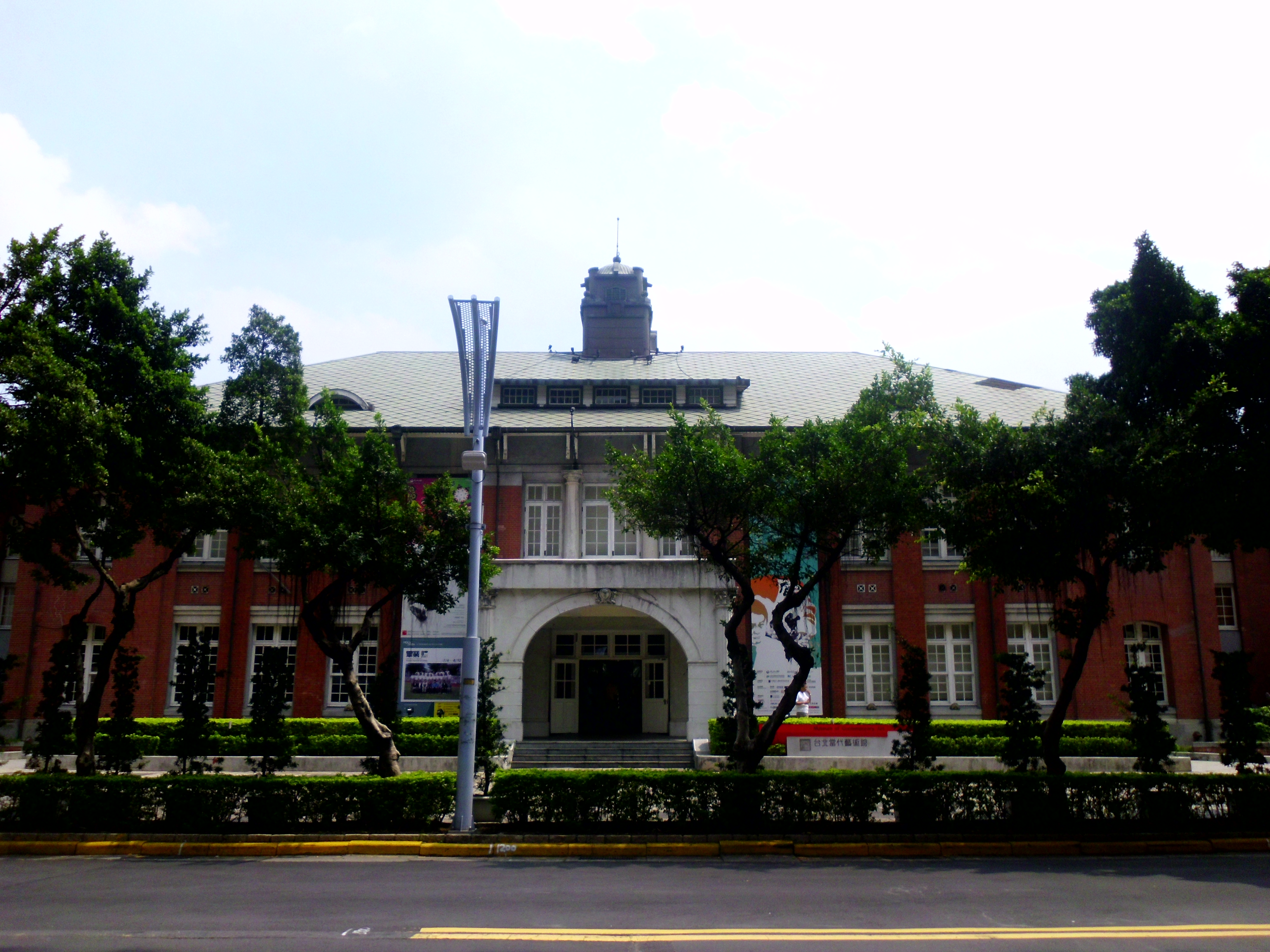
Museum of Contemporary Art Taipei, also known as "old city hall"

In 2001 a new museum opened as Museum of Contemporary Art Taipei. The museum is housed in a building that formerly housed Taipei City government offices.

==== Taipei 101 ====
Taipei 101 is a 101-floor landmark skyscraper that claimed the title of world's tallest building when it opened in 2004, a title it held for six years before the Burj Khalifa in Dubai was completed. Designed by C.Y. Lee & Partners and constructed by KTRT Joint Venture, Taipei 101 measures 509 metres (1,670 ft) from ground to top, making it the first skyscraper in the world to break the half-kilometer mark in height. Built to withstand typhoon winds and earthquake tremors, its design incorporates many engineering innovations and has won numerous international awards. It uses a principle that buildings can endure seismic forces by moving with them, rather than against them, which has underpinned traditional architecture in earthquake-prone East Asian countries for centuries. It uses a tuned mass damper, which acts as a giant counterweight. Today, the Taipei 101 remains one of the tallest skyscrapers in the world and holds LEED's certification as the world's largest "green" building. Its shopping mall and its indoor and outdoor observatories draws visitors from all over the world. Taipei 101's New Year's Eve fireworks display is a regular feature of international broadcasts.

==== Performing arts ====
The National Theater and Concert Hall stands at Taipei's Liberty Square and host events by foreign and domestic performers. Other leading concert venues include Zhongshan Hall at Ximending and the Sun Yat-sen Memorial Hall near Taipei 101.

A new venue, the Taipei Performing Arts Center opened in 2022. The venue is near the Shilin Night Market and houses three theaters for events with multi-week runs. The architectural design, by Rem Koolhaas and OMA, was determined in 2009 in an international competition. The same design process is also in place for a new Taipei Center for Popular Music and Taipei City Museum.

==== Shopping and recreation ====
Taipei is known for its many night markets, which include the Shilin Night Market in the Shilin District. The surrounding streets by Shilin Night Market are extremely crowded during the evening, usually opening late afternoon and operating well past midnight. Most night markets feature individual stalls selling a mixture of food, clothing, and consumer goods.

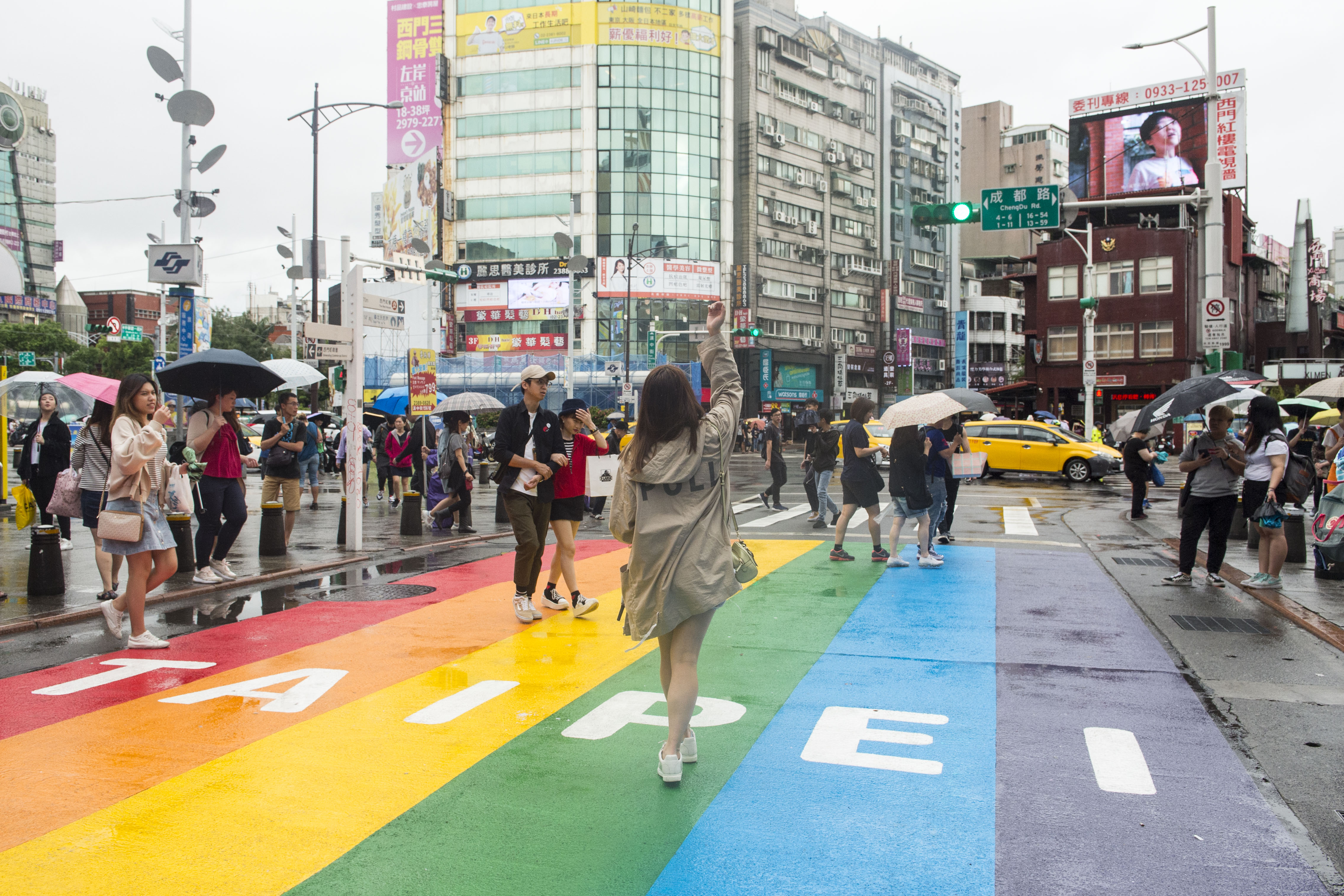
The busy streets of Ximending

Ximending has been an area for shopping and entertainment since the 1930s. Historic structures include a concert hall, a historic cinema, and the Red House Theater. Modern structures house karaoke businesses, art film cinemas, wide-release movie cinemas, electronic stores, and a wide variety of restaurants and fashion clothing stores. The pedestrian area is especially popular with teens and has been called the "Harajuku" of Taipei.

The newly developed Xinyi District is popular with tourists and locals alike for its many entertainment and shopping venues, as well as being the home of Taipei 101, a prime tourist attraction. Malls in the area include the sprawling Shin Kong Mitsukoshi complex, Breeze Center, Bellavita, Taipei 101 mall, Eslite Bookstore's flagship store (which includes a boutique mall), The Living Mall, ATT shopping mall, and the Vieshow Cinemas (formerly known as Warner Village). The Xinyi district also serves as the center of Taipei's active nightlife, with several popular lounge bars and nightclubs concentrated in a relatively small area around the Neo19, ATT 4 FUN and Taipei 101 buildings.

The thriving shopping area around Taipei Main Station includes the Taipei Underground Market and the original Shin Kong Mitsukoshi department store at Shin Kong Life Tower. Other popular shopping destinations include the Zhongshan Metro Mall, Dihua Street and the Guang Hua Digital Plaza. The Miramar Entertainment Park is known for its large Ferris wheel and IMAX theater.

Taipei maintains an extensive system of parks, green spaces, and nature preserves. Parks and forestry areas of note in and around the city include Yangmingshan National Park, Taipei Zoo and Da-an Forest Park. Located ten kilometers (6.2 mi) north of the city center, Yangmingshan National Park is visited for its cherry blossoms, hot springs, and sulfur deposits. It is the home of writer Lin Yutang, the summer residence of Chiang Kai-shek, residences of foreign diplomats, the Chinese Culture University, the meeting place of the now defunct National Assembly of the Republic of China, and the Kuomintang Party Archives. The Taipei Zoo was founded in 1914 and covers an area of 165 hectares for animal sanctuary.

Bitan is known for boating and water sports. Tamsui is a popular sea-side resort town. Ocean beaches are accessible in several directions from Taipei.

==== Temples ====
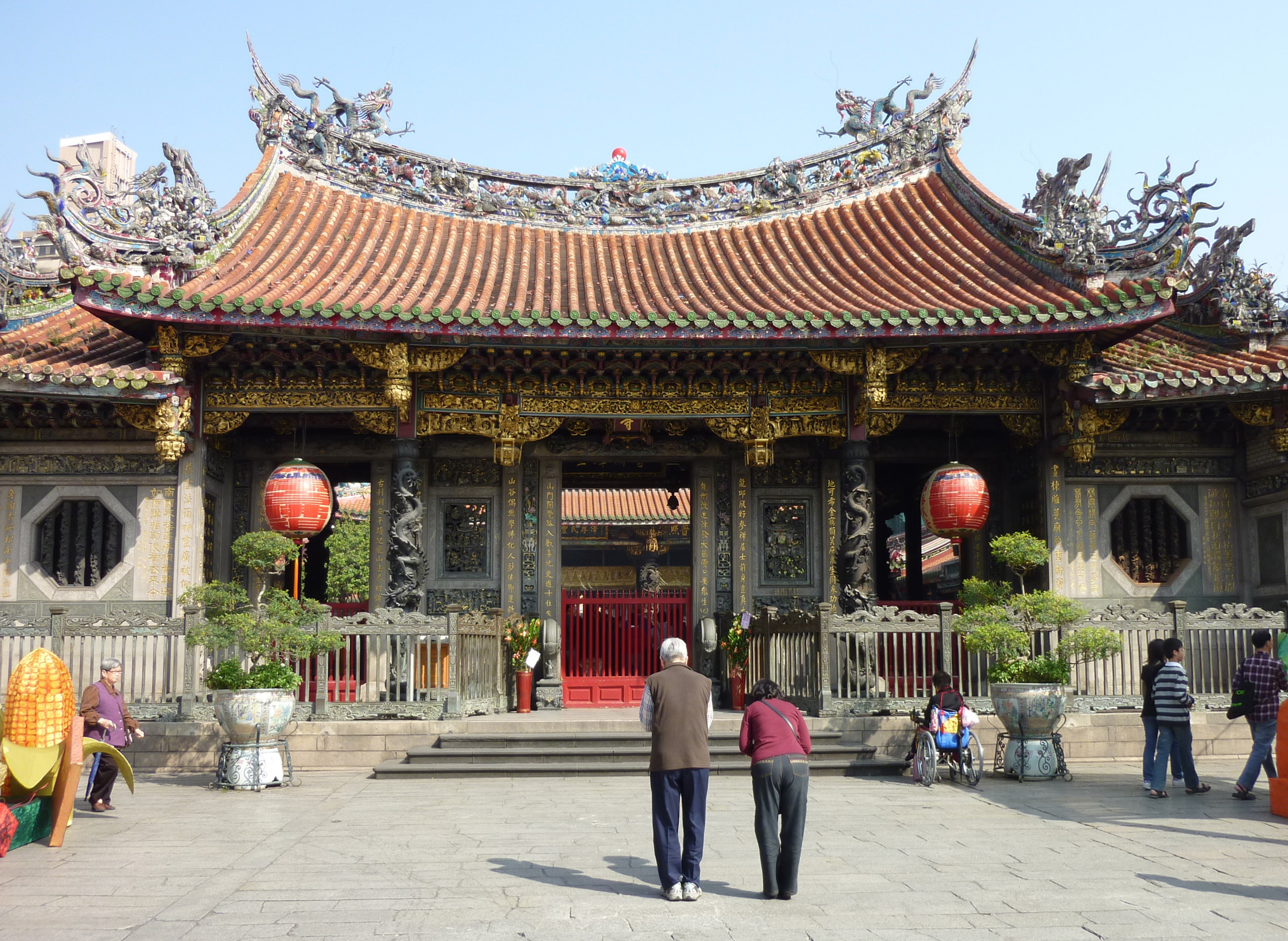
Built in 1738, Bangka Lungshan Temple is one of the oldest temples in the city.

Taipei has a variety of temples dedicating to Deities from Chinese folk religion, Taoism and Chinese Buddhism. The Bangka Lungshan Temple (艋舺龍山寺), built in 1738 and located in the Wanhua District, demonstrates an example of architecture with southern Chinese influences commonly seen on older buildings in Taiwan. Qingshui Temple (艋舺清水巖) built in 1787 and Qingshan Temple (艋舺青山宮) together with Lungshan Temple are the three most prominent landmark temples in Bangka or Wanhua District.

Other temples include Baoan Temple (大龍峒保安宮) located in historic Dalongdong, a national historical site, and Xia Hai City God Temple (大稻埕霞海城隍廟), located in the old Dadaocheng community, constructed with architecture similar to temples in southern Fujian. The Taipei Confucius Temple (臺北孔子廟) traces its history back to 1879 during the Qing dynasty and also incorporates southern Fujian-style architecture. Ciyou Temple (松山慈祐宮) in Songshan District, Guandu Temple (關渡宮) in Beitou District, Hsing Tian Kong (行天宮) in Zhongshan District and Zhinan Temple (指南宮) in Wenshan District are also popular temples for locals and tourists. Xinsheng South Road is known as the "Road to Heaven" due to its high concentration of temples, churches, and other houses of worship.

The Shandao Temple (善導寺) built in 1929 and located in Zhongzheng District, is the largest Buddhist temple in Taipei. Fo Guang Shan has a modern temple known as Fo Guang Shan Taipei Vihara (佛光山臺北道場) in Xinyi District, while Dharma Drum Mountain owns the Degui Academy (德貴學苑), an education center in Zhongzheng District and the Nung Chan Monastery (農禪寺) in Beitou District. Linji Huguo Chan Temple (臨濟護國禪寺) in Zhongshan District was commenced in 1900 and completed in 1911, it is one of the very few Japanese style Buddhist Temples that was well-preserved in Taiwan.

Besides large temples, small outdoor shrines to local deities are very common and are commonly found next to roads as well as in parks and neighborhoods. Many homes and businesses may also set up small shrines of candles, figurines, and offerings. Some restaurants, for example, may set up a small shrine to the Kitchen God for success in a restaurant business.

=== Festivals and events ===
Many yearly festivals are held in Taipei. In recent years some festivals, such as the Double Ten Day fireworks and concerts, are increasingly hosted on a rotating basis by a number of cities around Taiwan.

When New Year's Eve arrives on the solar calendar, thousands of people converge on Taipei's Xinyi District for parades, outdoor concerts by popular artists, street shows, round-the clock nightlife. The high point is the countdown to midnight, when Taipei 101 assumes the role of the world's largest fireworks platform.

The Taipei Lantern Festival concludes the Lunar New Year holiday. The timing of the city's lantern exhibit coincides with the national festival in Pingxi, when thousands of fire lanterns are released into the sky. The city's lantern exhibit rotates among different downtown locales from year to year, including Liberty Square, Taipei 101, and Zhongshan Hall in Ximending.

On Double Ten Day, patriotic celebrations are held in front of the Presidential Office Building. Other annual festivals include Ancestors Day (Tomb-Sweeping Day), the Dragon Boat Festival, the Zhong Yuan Festival, and the Mid-Autumn Festival (Mooncake Festival). Qing Shan King Sacrificial Ceremony (青山王祭) is a century-old grand festival that is held annually in Wanhua District.

Taipei regularly hosts its share of international events. The city recently hosted the 2009 Summer Deaflympics. This event was followed by the Taipei International Flora Exposition, a garden festival hosted from November 2010 to April 2011. The Floral Expo was the first of its kind to take place in Taiwan and only the seventh hosted in Asia; the expo admitted 110,000 visitors on 27 February 2011.

== Government ==
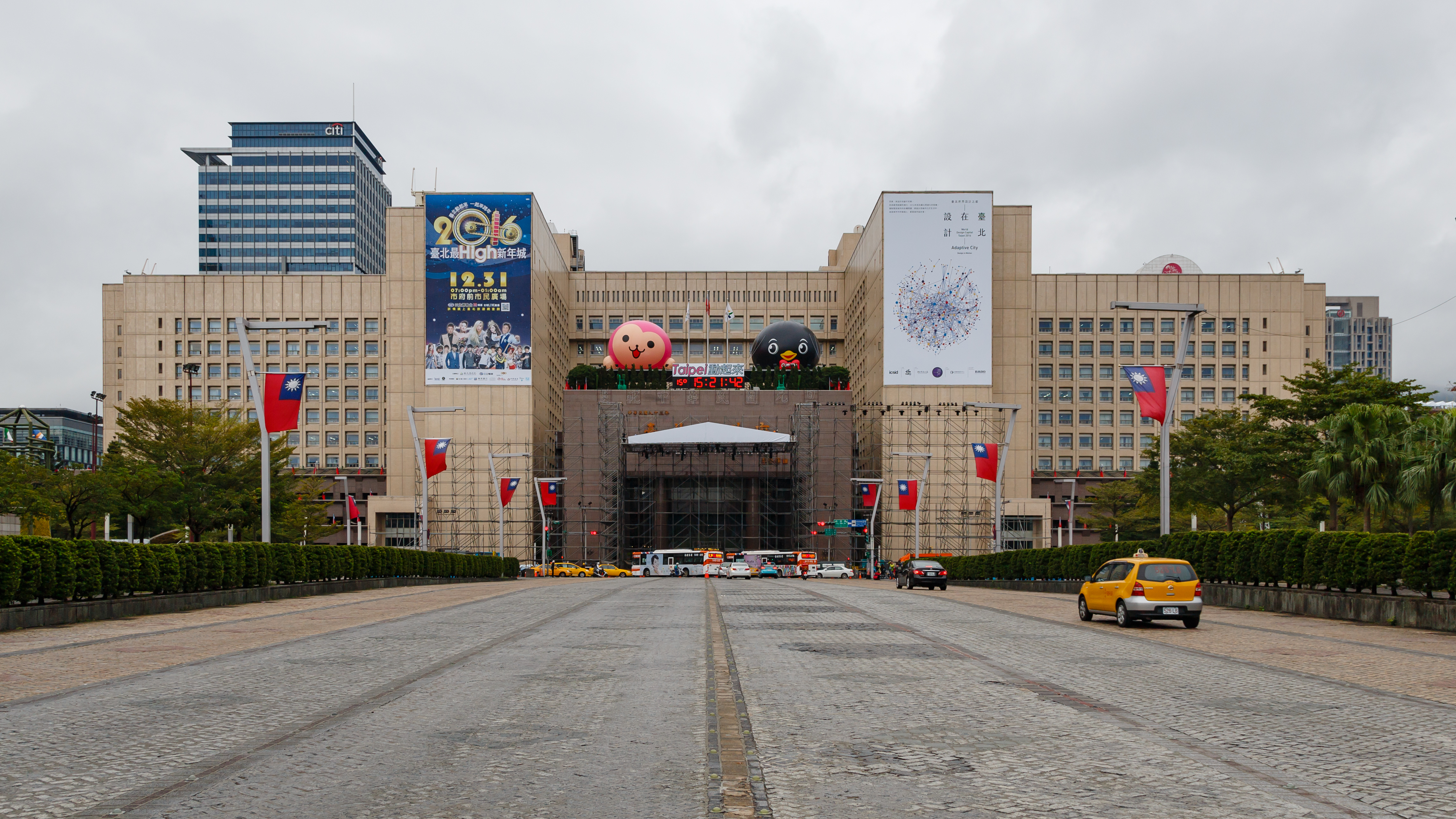
Taipei City Government

Taipei City Council

Taipei City is a special municipality which is directly under the Executive Yuan (Central Government). The mayor of Taipei City was an appointed position since Taipei's conversion to a centrally administered municipality in 1967 until the first public election was held in 1994. The position has a four-year term and is elected by direct popular vote. The first elected mayor was Chen Shui-bian of the Democratic Progressive Party. Ma Ying-jeou took office in 1998 for two terms, before handing it over to Hau Lung-pin who won the 2006 mayoral election on 9 December 2006. Both Chen Shui-bian and Ma Ying-Jeou went on to become President of the Republic of China. The incumbent mayor, Chiang Wan-an of Kuomintang, took office on 25 December 2022.

Ketagalan Boulevard, where the Presidential Office Building and other government structures are situated, is often the site of mass gatherings such as inauguration and national holiday parades, receptions for visiting dignitaries, political demonstrations, and public festivals.

=== Politics ===
Taiwanese presidential results in Taipei City
Year	DPP		KMT		Others	
Year	No.	%	No.	%	No.	%
2024	587,897	38.13%	587,258	38.08%	366,854	23.79%
2020	875,854	53.65%	685,830	42.01%	70,769	4.34%
2016	757,383	51.96%	546,491	37.49%	153,804	10.55%
2012	634,565	39.54%	928,717	57.87%	41,448	2.58%
2008	593,256	36.97%	1,011,546	63.03%		
2004	690,379	43.47%	897,870	56.53%		
2000	597,465	37.64%	347,564	21.90%	642,137	40.16%
1996	338,895	24.34%	541,721	38.90%	511,813	36.76%

Based on the outcomes of previous elections in the past decade, the vote of the overall constituency of Taipei City shows a slight inclination towards the pro-KMT camp (the Pan-Blue Coalition); however, the pro-DPP camp (the Pan-Green Coalition) also has considerable support. Tsai-Ing Wen was the first DPP presidential candidate to win the city after a series of consecutive of KMT victories.

The Kuomintang is the biggest party in the Taipei City Council. The incumbent mayor, Chiang Wan-an, is considered to be a moderate within the KMT.

=== Garbage recycling ===
Taipei City strongly promotes garbage recycling, with such success that other countries have sent teams to study the recycling system. After the Environmental Protection Administration (EPA) established a program in 1998 combining the efforts of communities, a financial resource named the Recycling Fund was made available to recycling companies and waste collectors. The EPA also introduced garbage recycling trucks, in effort to raise community recycling awareness, that broadcast classical music (specifically Beethoven's "Für Elise" and Tekla Bądarzewska-Baranowska's "A Maiden's Prayer") to announce its arrival to the community. Manufacturers, vendors and importers of recyclable waste pay fees to the Fund, which uses the money to set firm prices for recyclables and subsidize local recycling efforts. Between 1998 and 2008, the recycling rate increased from 6 percent to 32 percent. This improvement enabled the government of Taipei to demonstrate its recycling system to the world at the Shanghai World Expo 2010.

=== Administrative divisions ===
Taipei City is divided up into 12 administrative districts (區; qū). Each district is further divided up into urban villages (里), which are further sub-divided up into neighborhoods (鄰). Xinyi District is the seat of the municipality where the Taipei City Government headquarters is located.

Map	District					Population (Jan. 2016)	Area (km^{2})	Postal code
Map	Name	Chinese	Pinyin	Wade–Giles	Pe̍h-ōe-jī	Population (Jan. 2016)	Area (km^{2})	Postal code
	Beitou	北投區	Běitóu	Pei-t'ou	Pak-tâu	257,922	56.8216	112
	Daan (Da-an, Da'an)	大安區	Dà'ān	Ta-an	Tāi-an	312,909	11.3614	106
	Datong	大同區	Dàtóng	Ta-t'ung	Tāi-tông	131,029	5.6815	103
	Nangang (Nankang)	南港區	Nángǎng	Nan-kang	Lâm-káng	122,296	21.8424	115
	Neihu	內湖區	Nèihú	Nei-hu	Lāi-ô͘	287,726	31.5787	114
	Shilin	士林區	Shìlín	Shih-lin	Sū-lîm	290,682	62.3682	111
	Songshan	松山區	Sōngshān	Sung-shan	Siông-san	209,689	9.2878	105
	Wanhua	萬華區	Wànhuá	Wan-hua	Báng-kah	194,314	8.8522	108
	Wenshan	文山區	Wénshān	Wen-shan	Bûn-san	275,433	31.5090	116
	Xinyi	信義區	Xìnyì	Hsin-yi	Sìn-gī	229,139	11.2077	110
	Zhongshan	中山區	Zhōngshān	Chung-shan	Tiong-san	231,286	13.6821	104
	Zhongzheng	中正區	Zhōngzhèng	Chung-cheng	Tiong-chèng	162,549	7.6071	100

=== City planning ===
The city is characterized by straight roads and public buildings of grand Western architectural styles. The city is built on a square grid configuration; however, these blocks are huge by international standards with 500-metre (1,640.42 ft) sides. The area in between these blocks is infilled with lanes and alleys, which provide access to quieter residential or mixed-use development. Other than a citywide 30-kilometre-per-hour (19 mph) speed limit, there is little uniform planning within this "hidden" area; therefore, lanes (perpendicular to streets) and alleys (parallel with streets, or, conceptually, perpendicular to lanes) spill out from the main controlled-access highways. These minor roads are not always perpendicular and sometimes cut through the block diagonally.

Although development began in the western districts of the city (still considered the cultural heart of Taipei) due to trade, the eastern districts have become the focus of recent development projects. Many of the western districts have become targets of urban renewal initiatives.

== Transportation ==
Underground platforms of Nangang Exhibition Center Station on the Taipei Metro system

Public transport accounts for a substantial portion of transportation trips in Taipei. According to a 2022 government survey, 34.9% of transportation trips were taken on public transit in Taipei, higher than any other locality in the country. Private transport consists of motor scooters, private cars, taxi cabs and bicycles. Private transport trips represented 41.6% of trips taken in Taipei in 2022, the lowest in Taiwan.

Taipei Main Station serves as the comprehensive hub for the subway, bus, conventional rail, and high-speed rail. A contactless smartcard, known as EasyCard, can be used for all modes of public transit as well as several retail outlets. It contains credits that are deducted each time a ride is taken. The EasyCard is read via MIFARE panels on buses and in MRT stations, and it does not need to be removed from one's wallet or purse.

=== Metro ===
Taipei's public transport system, the Taipei Metro (commonly referred to as the MRT), incorporates a metro and light rail system based on advanced VAL and Bombardier technology. There are currently six metro lines that are organized and labeled in three ways: by color, line number and depot station name. In addition to the rapid transit system itself, the Taipei Metro also includes several public facilities such as the Maokong Gondola, underground shopping malls, parks, and public squares. Modifications to existing railway lines to integrate them into the metro system are underway.

In 2017 a rapid transit line was opened to connect Taipei with Taiwan Taoyuan International Airport and Zhongli District. The new line is part of the new Taoyuan Metro system.

On 31 January 2020, Hitachi Rail Corporation officially commissioned Phase 1 of the Circular line which took place at Shisizhang station. The Circular line is a 15.4-kilometre driverless rail system. The Circular line offered free rides beginning in February 2020 for passengers to test the route.

Taipei Main Station concourse

=== Rail ===
Beginning in 1983, surface rail lines in the city were moved underground as part of the Taipei Railway Underground Project. Taiwan High Speed Rail system opened in 2007. The bullet trains connect Taipei with the west coast cities of New Taipei, Taoyuan, Hsinchu, Taichung, Chiayi, and Tainan before terminating at Zuoying (Kaohsiung) at speeds that cut travel times by 60% or more from what they normally are on a bus or conventional train. The Taiwan Railway also runs passenger and freight services throughout the entire island.

=== Bus ===
An extensive city bus system serves metropolitan areas not covered by the metro, with exclusive bus lanes to facilitate transportation. Riders of the city metro system are able to use the EasyCard for discounted fares on buses, and vice versa. A unique feature of the Taipei bus system is the joint venture of private transportation companies that operate the system's routes while sharing the fare system. This route is in sharp contrast to bus systems in the U.S. which are mostly public entities. Several major intercity bus terminals are located throughout the city, including the Taipei Bus Station and Taipei City Hall Bus Station.

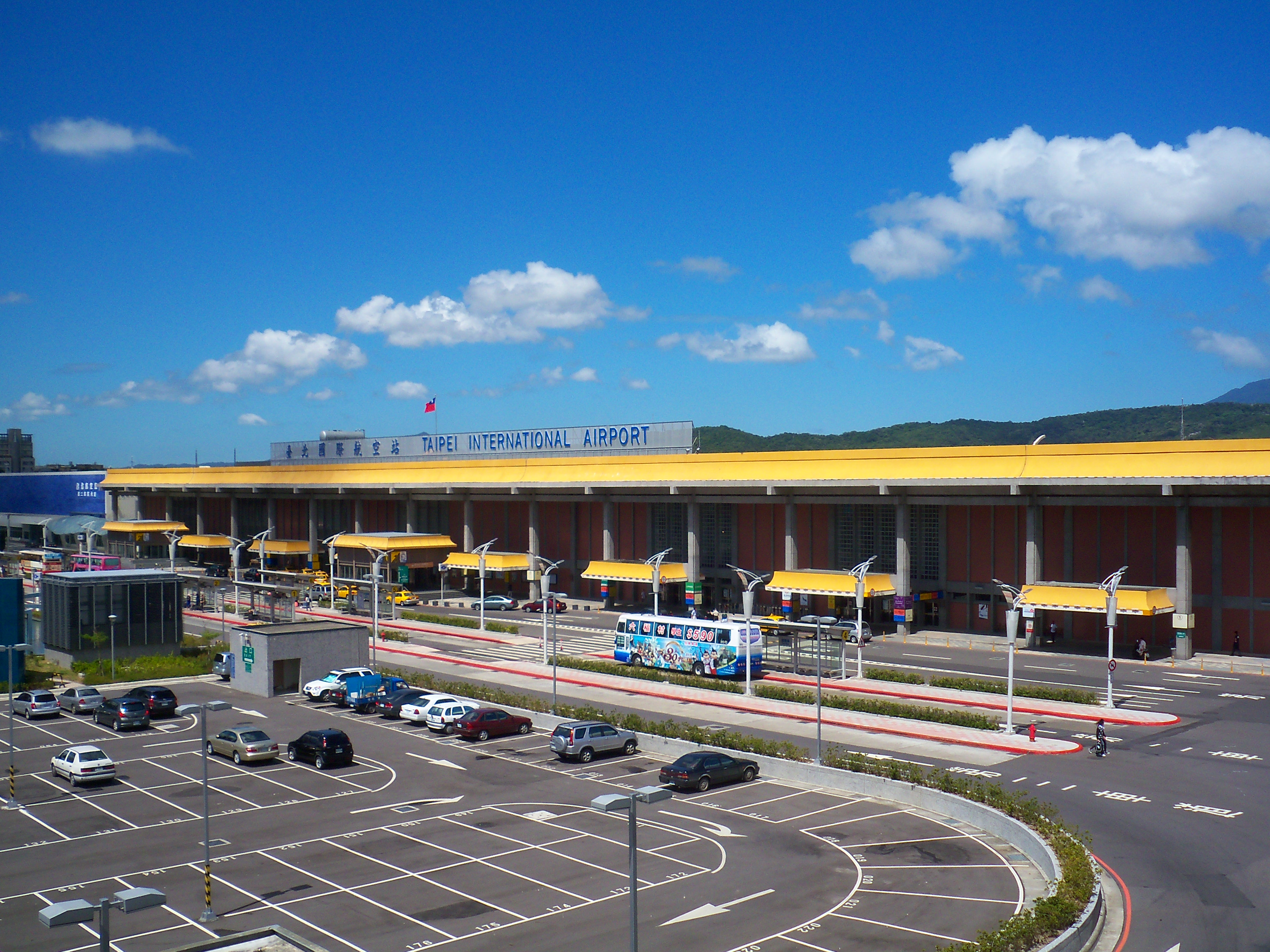
Taipei Songshan Airport

=== Airports ===
Most scheduled international flights are served by Taoyuan International Airport in nearby Taoyuan City. Songshan Airport, at the heart of the city in the Songshan District, serves domestic flights and scheduled flights to Haneda Airport in Tokyo, Gimpo International Airport in Seoul, and about 15 destinations in the People's Republic of China. Songshan Airport is accessible by the Taipei Metro Neihu Line; Taoyuan International Airport is accessible by the Taoyuan Airport MRT.

=== Ticketing ===
In 1994, following the rapid development of Taipei, a white paper for transport policies expressed the strong objective of creating a transport system for the people of Taipei to accommodate the burgeoning city's needs. In 1999, they chose Mitac consortium, which Thales-Transportation Systems is part of. Thales was then selected again in 2005 to deploy an upgrade of Taipei's public transport network with an end-to-end and fully contactless automatic fare collection solution that integrates 116 metro stations, 5,000 buses and 92 car parks.

== Education ==
West Site of National Taiwan University Hospital

Taipei is home to the campuses of 24 universities and Academia Sinica, Taiwan's national academy which supports the Taiwan International Graduate Program:

- Academia Sinica (1928/1949)
- National Taiwan University (1928)
- National Chengchi University (1927)
- National Defense Medical Center (1902)
- National Defense University (1906)
- National Taipei University of Technology (1912)
- National Taipei University (1949)
- National Taipei University of Business (1917)
- National Taipei University of Education (1895)
- National Taipei University of Nursing and Health Science (1947)
- National Taiwan University of Science and Technology (1974)
- National Taiwan College of Performing Arts (1957)
- National Taiwan Normal University (1922/1946)
- National Yang Ming Chiao Tung University (1975)
- Taipei National University of the Arts (1982)
- University of Taipei (2013)
- Tamkang University (1950)
- Soochow University (1900)
- Chinese Culture University (1962)
- Ming Chuan University (1957)
- Shih Hsin University (1956)
- Shih Chien University (1958)
- Taipei Medical University (1960)
- Tatung University (1956)
- China University of Technology (1965)

National Taiwan University (NTU) was established in 1928 during the period of Japanese colonial rule. NTU has produced many political and social leaders in Taiwan. Both pan-blue and pan-green movements in Taiwan are rooted on the NTU campus. The university has six campuses in the greater Taipei region (including New Taipei) and two additional campuses in Nantou County. The university governs farms, forests, and hospitals for educational and research purposes. The main campus is in Taipei's Da-An district, where most department buildings and all the administrative buildings are located. The College of Law and the College of Medicine are located near the Presidential Office Building. The National Taiwan University Hospital is a leading international center of medical research.

National Taiwan Normal University (NTNU) likewise traces its origins to the Japanese colonial period. Founded as Taihoku College in 1922 and organized as a teacher training institution by the Kuomintang in 1946, NTNU has since developed into a comprehensive international university. The university boasts especially strong programs in the humanities and international education. Worldwide it is perhaps best known as home of the Mandarin Training Center, a program that offers Mandarin language training each year to over a thousand students from scores of countries throughout the world. The main campus, in Daan district near Guting metro station, is known for its historic architecture. The Shida market area surrounding this campus takes its name from the school's acronym 師大 in Mandarin.

== Sports ==
Taipei Arena

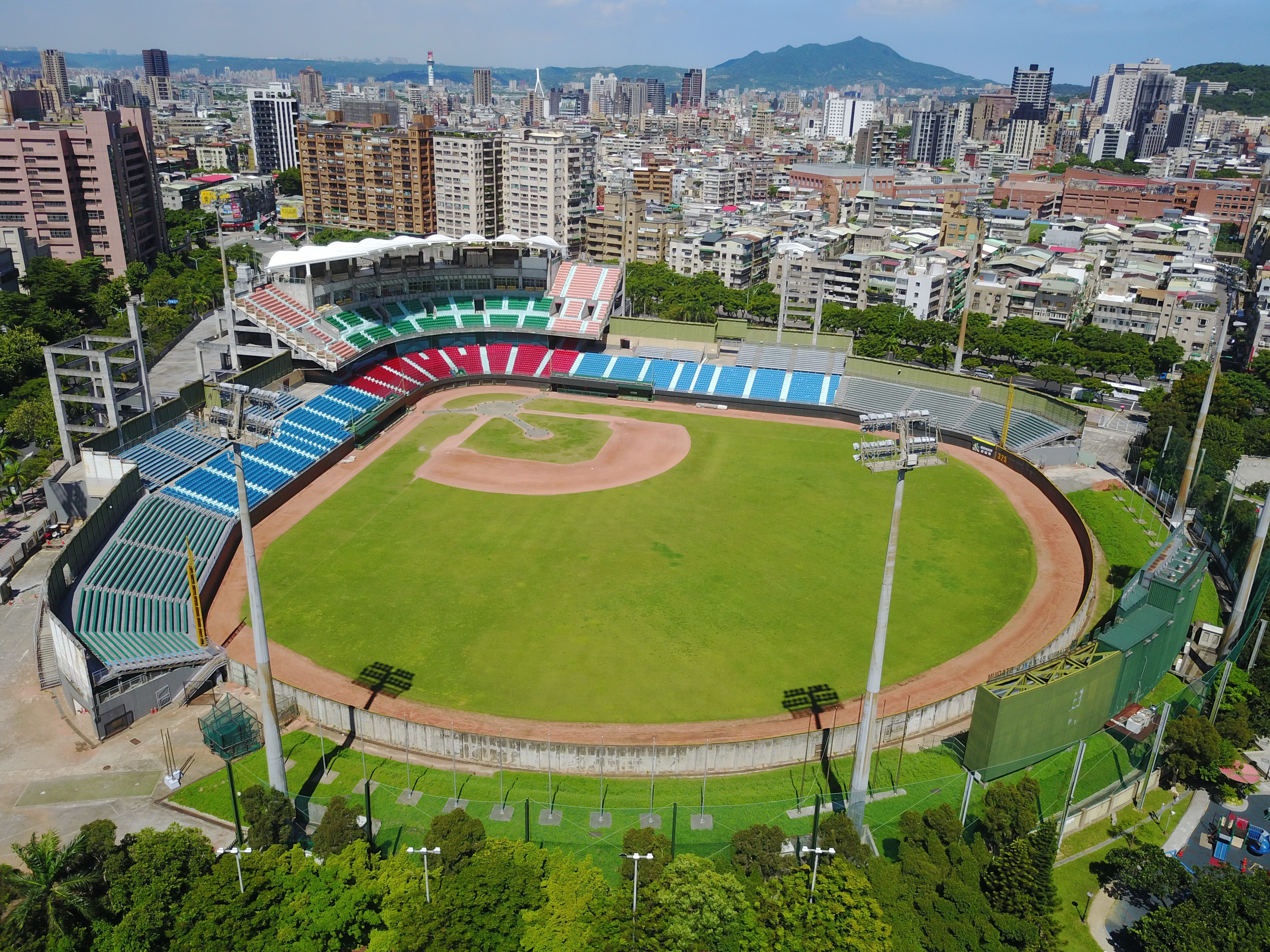
Tianmu Baseball Stadium

Wei Chuan Dragons of Taiwan's Chinese Professional Baseball League is a professional baseball team based in Taipei. The Taipei Highwealth team of the Popcorn League is also based in Taipei, co-sponsored by the Taipei City Government and Highwealth Construction.

Taipei also has two professional basketball teams, the Taipei Taishin Mars of the T1 League and the Taipei Fubon Braves of the P. League+.

=== Major sporting events ===
Below is a selected list of recent sporting events hosted by the city:

- 2004 FIFA Futsal World Championship
- 2006 Women's Baseball World Cup
- 2007 Baseball World Cup
- 2009 Asian Judo Championships
- 2009 Summer Deaflympics
- 2013 Badminton Asia Championships
- 2015 WBSC Premier12
- 2016 IIHF Women's Challenge Cup of Asia Division I
- 2017 Summer Universiade
- 2019 Asian Men's Club Volleyball Championship
- 2022 U-23 Baseball World Cup (co-hosted with Taichung and Yunlin)
- 2023 Asian Men's Volleyball Challenge Cup
- 2023 IKF World Korfball Championship
- 2023 U-18 Baseball World Cup (Co-hosted with Taichung)
- 2024 World Junior Figure Skating Championships
- 2024 WBSC Premier12
- 2025 Summer World Masters Games (co-hosted with New Taipei City)
- 2026 TWIF Indoor World Championships
- Taipei Marathon (annual): The marathon is one of the two World Athletics Label Road Races in Taiwan, being categorized as an Elite Label Road Race. The other race is the New Taipei City Wan Jin Shi Marathon, categorized as a Gold Label Road Race.

The Taipei Arena is located at the site of the former Taipei Municipal Baseball Stadium (demolished in 2000), with a capacity of over 15,000. It was opened on 1 December 2005 and has since held more art and cultural activities (such as live concerts) than sporting events, which it was originally designed for. The Chinese Taipei Ice Hockey League plays out of the auxiliary arena.

Taipei Dome and Tianmu Baseball Stadium are the major baseball venues in Taipei. The Taipei Dome, known officially as the Farglory Dome, which has the capacity to house 40,071 seats, officially opened in October 2023. On April 13, 2024, the Taipei Dome hosted the largest crowd in Taiwanese professional basketball history between the New Taipei CTBC DEA and the Taipei Mars.

Taipei Municipal Stadium is a multipurpose stadium that hosts football and track and field events, as well as concerts, both live and prerecorded. Originally built in 1956, it was demolished and reconstructed in 2009.

=== Youth baseball ===
In 2010, a Taipei baseball team—Chung-Ching Junior Little League—won the Junior League World Series. The achievement came after winning the Asia-Pacific Region, then defeating the Mexico Region and Latin America Region champions to become the International champion, and finally defeating the U.S. champion (Southwest Region), Rose Capital East LL (Tyler, Texas), 9–1. Taiwan's Little League World Series international team has won 17 championships, the most wins in the league.

In 2025, Taipei's Tung-Yuan Little League won the 2025 Little League World Series. This was Taiwan's 18th title in the Little League World Series and the first title since 29 years ago in 1996.

== Media ==
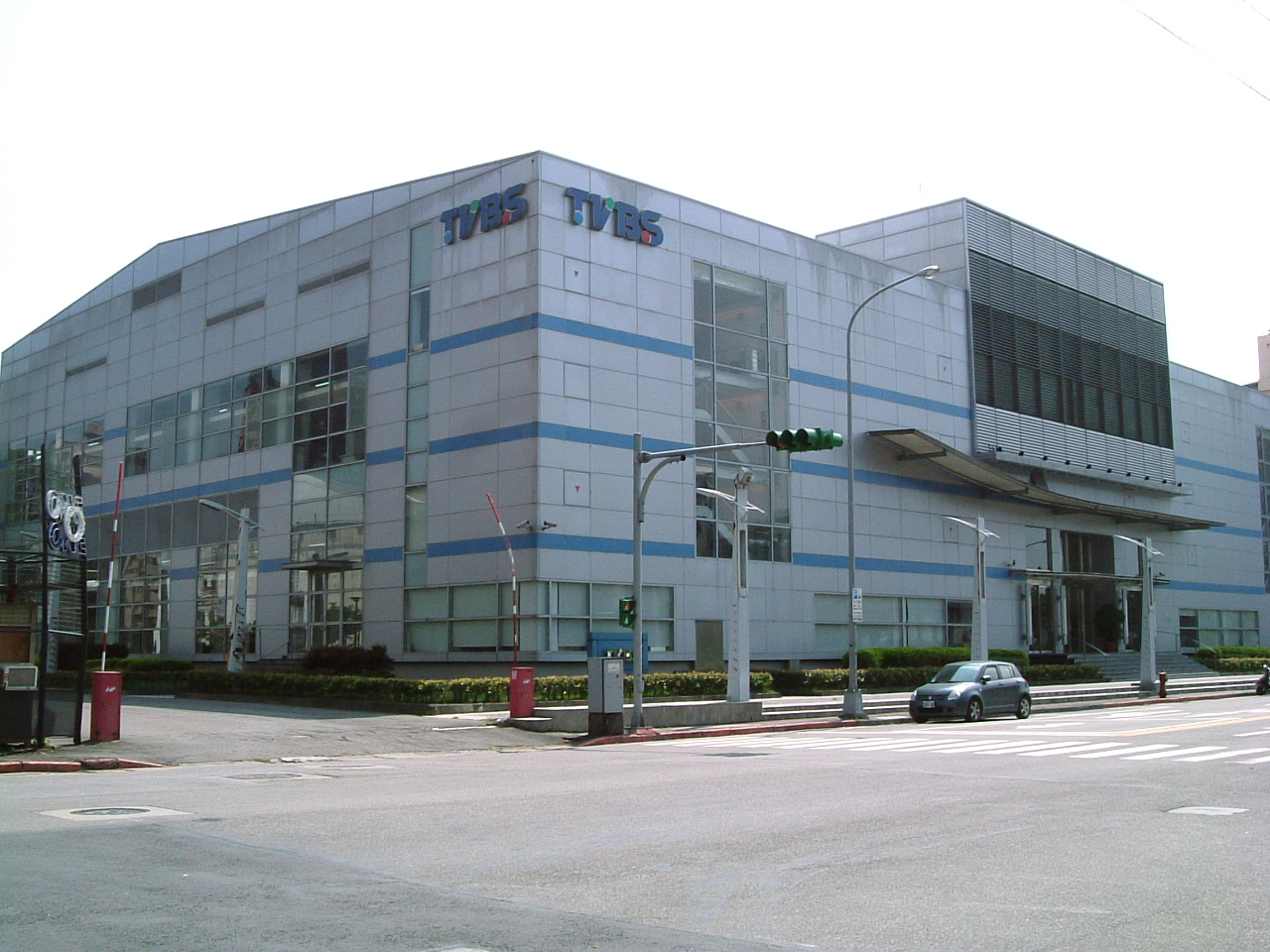
TVBS-G produces programs mainly from their Nangang building in Taipei City.

As the capital, Taipei City is the headquarters for many television and radio stations in Taiwan and the center of some of the country's largest newspapers.

=== Television ===
Television stations located in Taipei include the CTV MyLife, CTV News Channel, China Television, Chinese Television System, Chung T'ien Television, Dimo TV, Eastern Television, Era Television, FTV News, Follow Me TV, Formosa TV, Gala Television, Public Television Service, SET Metro, SET News, SET Taiwan, Sanlih E-Television, Shuang Xing, TTV Family, TTV Finance, TTV World, TVBS, TVBS-G, TVBS-NEWS, Taiwan Broadcasting System, Videoland Television Network and Taiwan Television.

=== Newspapers ===
Newspapers include Apple Daily, Central Daily News, The China Post, China Times, DigiTimes, Kinmen Daily News, Liberty Times, Mandarin Daily News, Matsu Daily, Min Sheng Bao, Sharp Daily, Taipei Times, Taiwan Daily, Taiwan News, Taiwan Times and United Daily News.

== International relations ==
Taipei was a member of the Asian Network of Major Cities 21 before its dissolvement.

=== Twin towns and sister cities ===
Taipei is twinned with:

==== United States ====
- Houston, TX, United States (1961)
- San Francisco, CA, United States (1970)
- Guam, United States (1973)
- Cleveland, OH, United States (1975)
- Indianapolis, IN, United States (1978)
- Marshall, TX, United States (1978)
- Atlanta, GA, United States (1979)
- Los Angeles, CA, United States (1979)
- Phoenix, AZ, United States (1979)
- Oklahoma City, OK, United States (1981)
- Boston, MA, United States (1996)
- Dallas, TX, United States (1996)

==== Outside United States ====
- Lomé, Togo (1966)
- Manila, Philippines (1966)
- Cotonou, Benin (1967)
- Quezon City, Philippines (1968)
- Seoul, South Korea (1968)
- Santo Domingo, Dominican Republic (1970)
- Jeddah, Saudi Arabia (1978)
- Gold Coast, Queensland, Australia (1982)
- Johannesburg, South Africa (1982)
- Pretoria, South Africa (1983)
- Lilongwe, Malawi (1984)
- San José, Costa Rica (1984)
- Versailles, France (1986)
- Asunción, Paraguay (1987)
- Panama City, Panama (1989)
- Managua, Nicaragua (1992)
- San Salvador, El Salvador (1993)
- Warsaw, Masovian Voivodeship, Poland (1995)
- Ulan-Ude, Buryatia, Russia (1996)
- Dakar, Senegal (1997)
- Banjul, Gambia (1997)
- Bissau, Guinea-Bissau (1997)
- Busan, South Korea (1997)
- Mbabane, Eswatini (1997)
- Ulaanbaatar, Mongolia (1997)
- San Nicolás, Nuevo León, Mexico (1997)
- La Paz, Bolivia (1997)
- Guatemala City, Guatemala (1998)
- Monrovia, Liberia (1998)
- Vilnius, Lithuania (1998)
- Majuro, Marshall Islands (1999)
- Riga, Latvia (2001)
- Ouagadougou, Burkina Faso (2008)
- Gwangju, South Korea (2008)
- Daegu, South Korea (2010)
- Quito, Ecuador (2015/2016)
- Castries, St. Lucia (2015/2016)
- Belmopan, Belize (2019)
- Prague, Czech Republic (2020)
- Lima, Peru (2020)
- Apia, Samoa

=== Partner cities ===
- Anchorage, AK, United States (1997)
- Montreal, Quebec, Canada (2001)
- New York City, New York, United States (2013)
- Quebec City, Quebec, Canada (2001)
- Ottawa, Ontario, Canada (2003)
- Toronto, Ontario, Canada (2004)
- Yokohama, Kanagawa, Japan (2006)
- Vancouver, British Columbia, Canada (2008)
- Winnipeg, Manitoba, Canada (2011)
- Wellington, New Zealand (2015)

=== Friendship cities ===
- Perth, Western Australia, Australia (1999)
- Gyeonggi-do, South Korea (2000)
- Orange County, CA, United States (2000)
- George Town, Penang, Malaysia (2009)
- Helsinki, Finland (2012)

== In popular culture ==
- Taipei's name is used in a professional wrestling match named the "Taipei Deathmatch" in which the wrestlers' fists are taped and dipped into glue and in broken and crushed glass, allowing shards to stick to their fists. This match can be won by pinfall, submission or escape.
- Writer Tao Lin's 2013 novel is titled Taipei and takes place in both New York City and Taipei, where the protagonist Paul's parents were born and live. In the novel, the character named Paul gets married and then visits Taipei with his new wife. They take MDMA and LSD and film a mock documentary on "Taiwan's first McDonald's". The novel was made into a movie titled High Resolution, starring Justin Chon and Ellie Bamber.

== Gallery ==
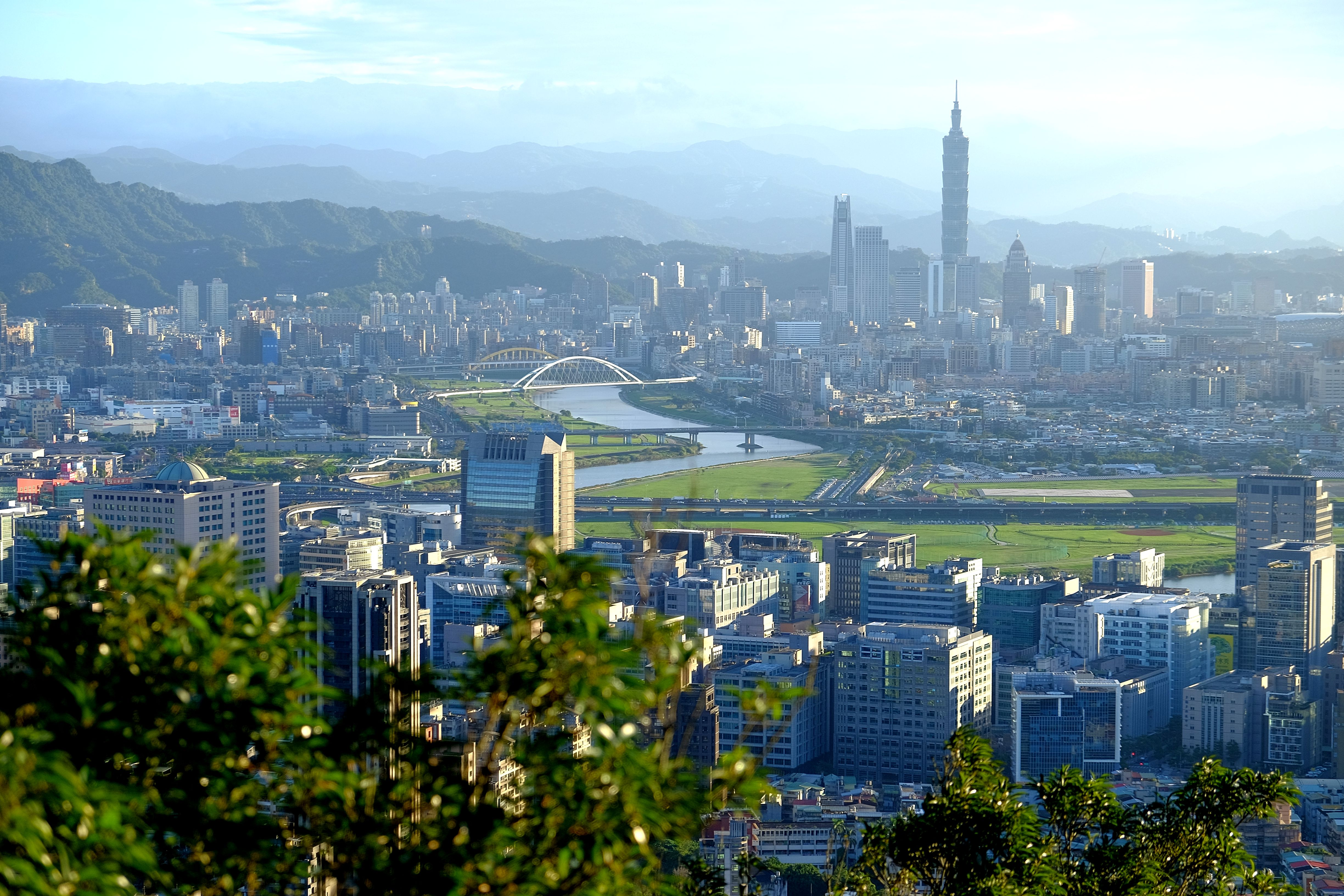
Taipei panoramic view

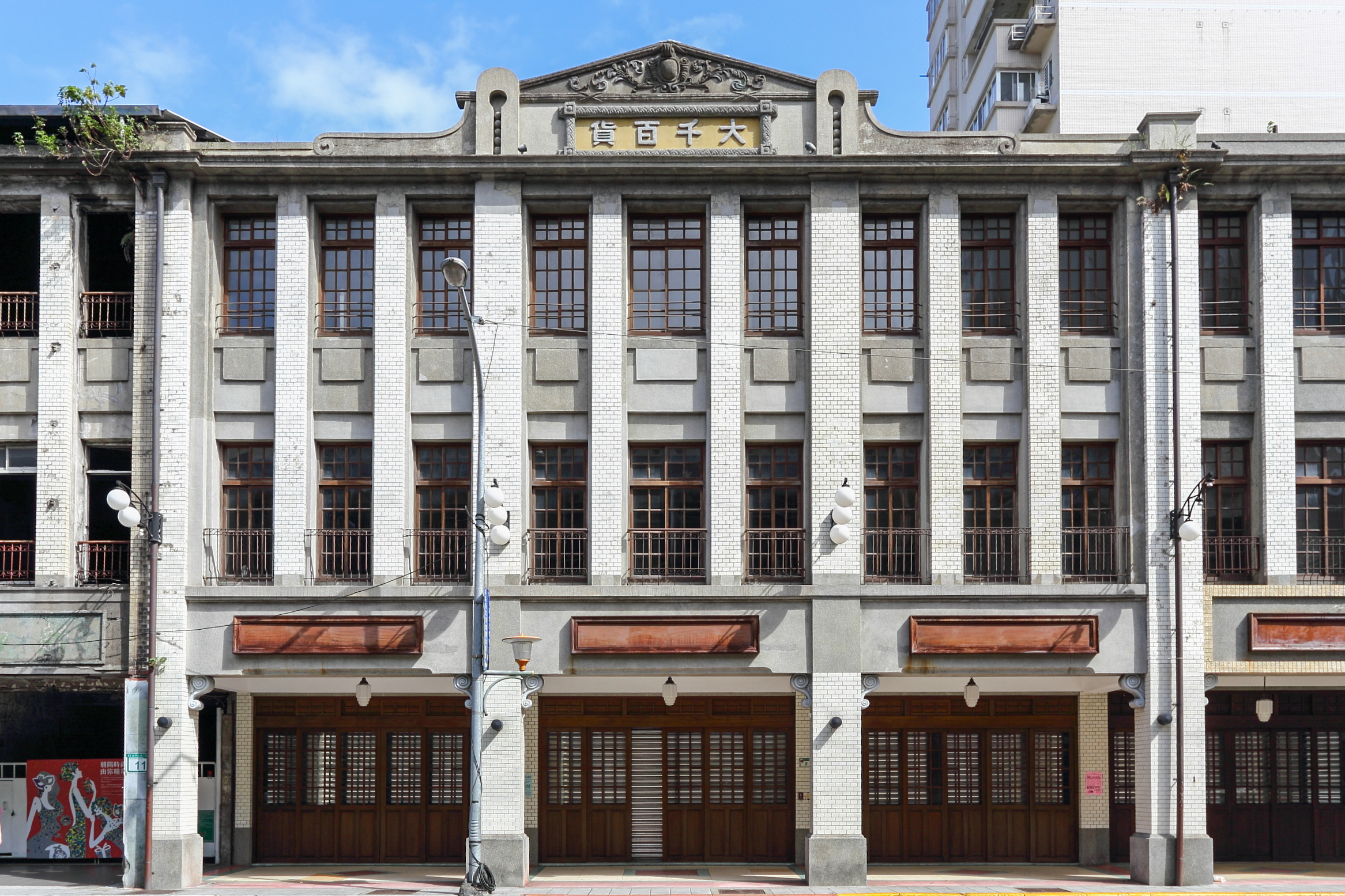
Dadaocheng

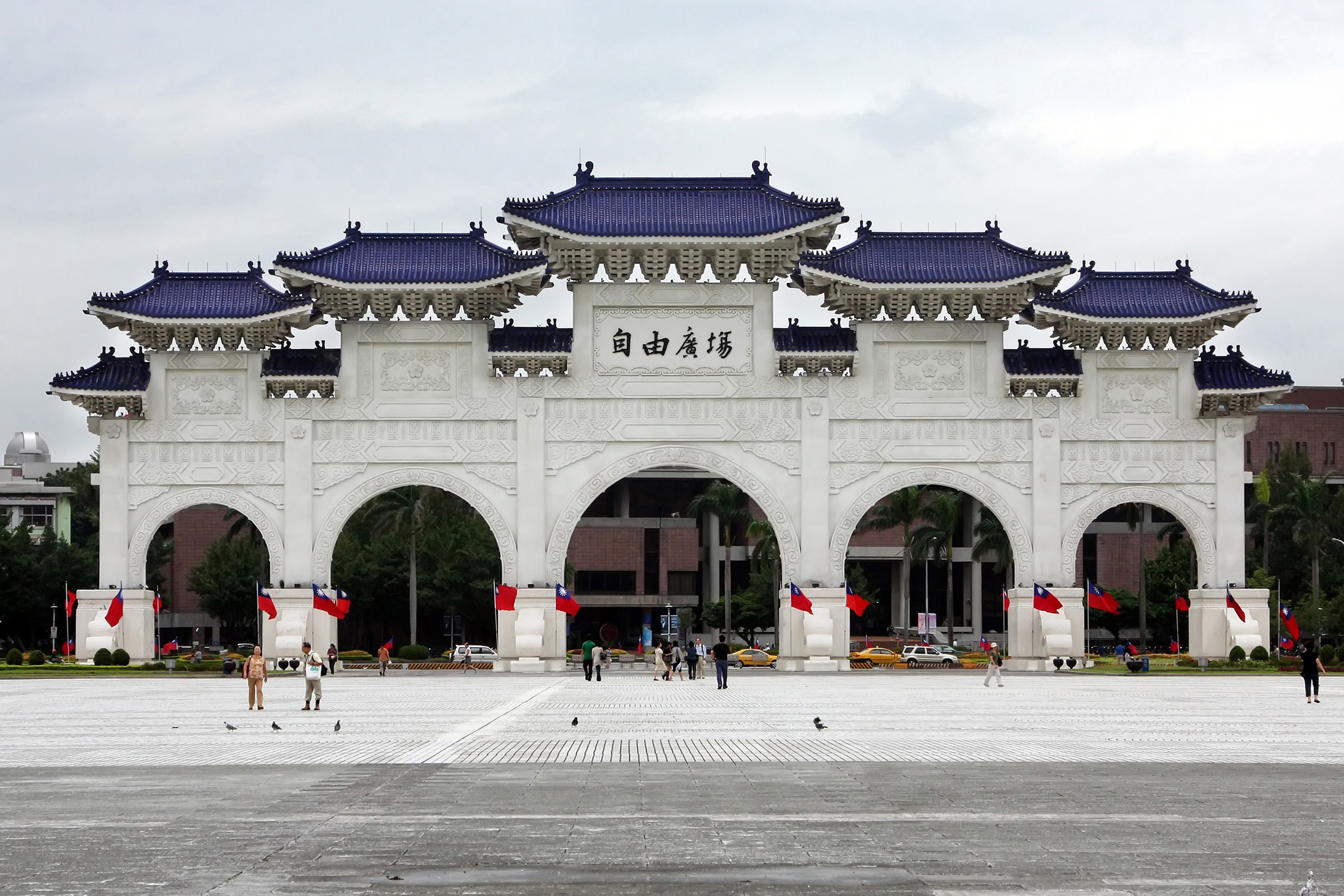
the main entrance of Chiang Kai-shek Memorial Hall

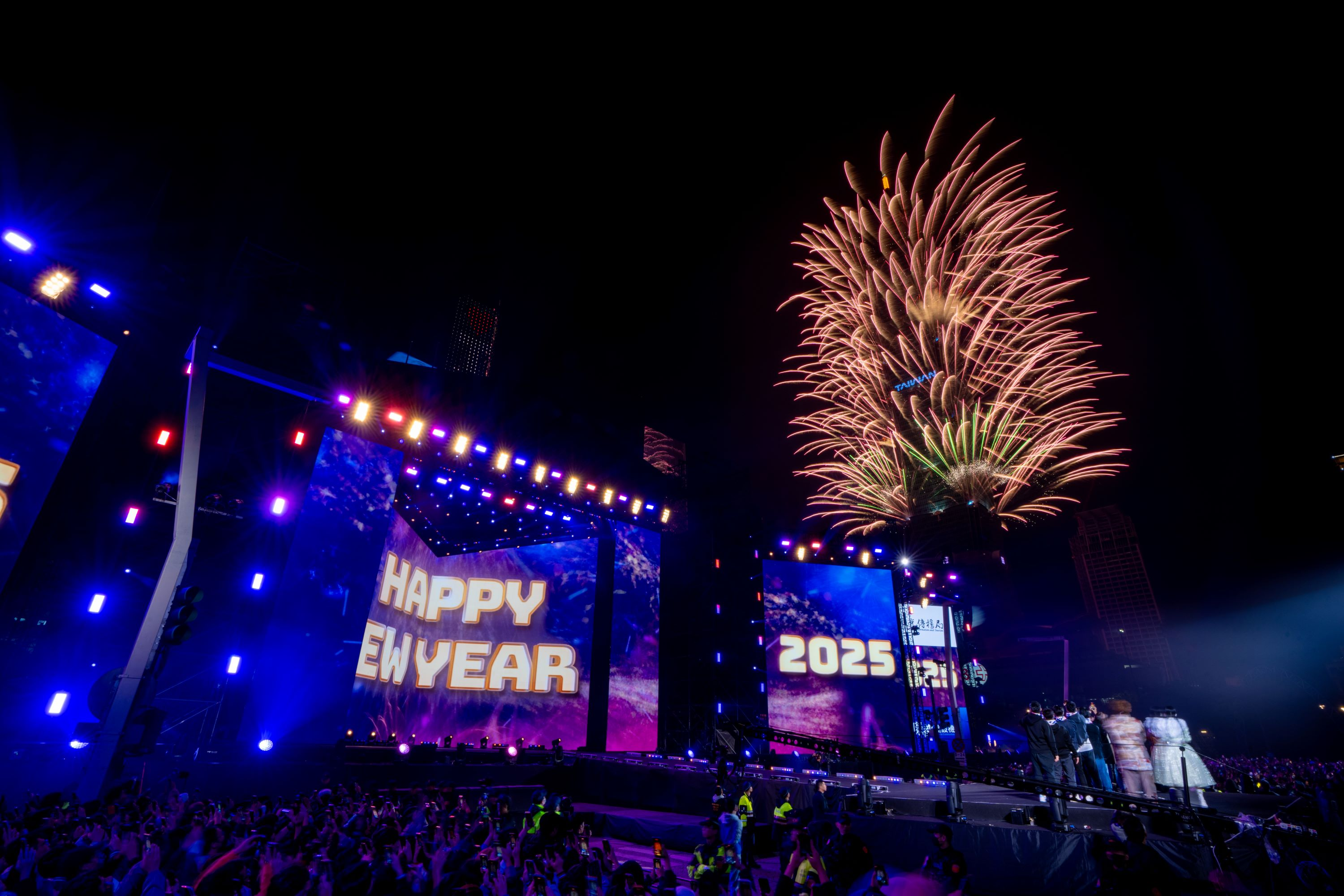
New year fireworks at Taipei 101

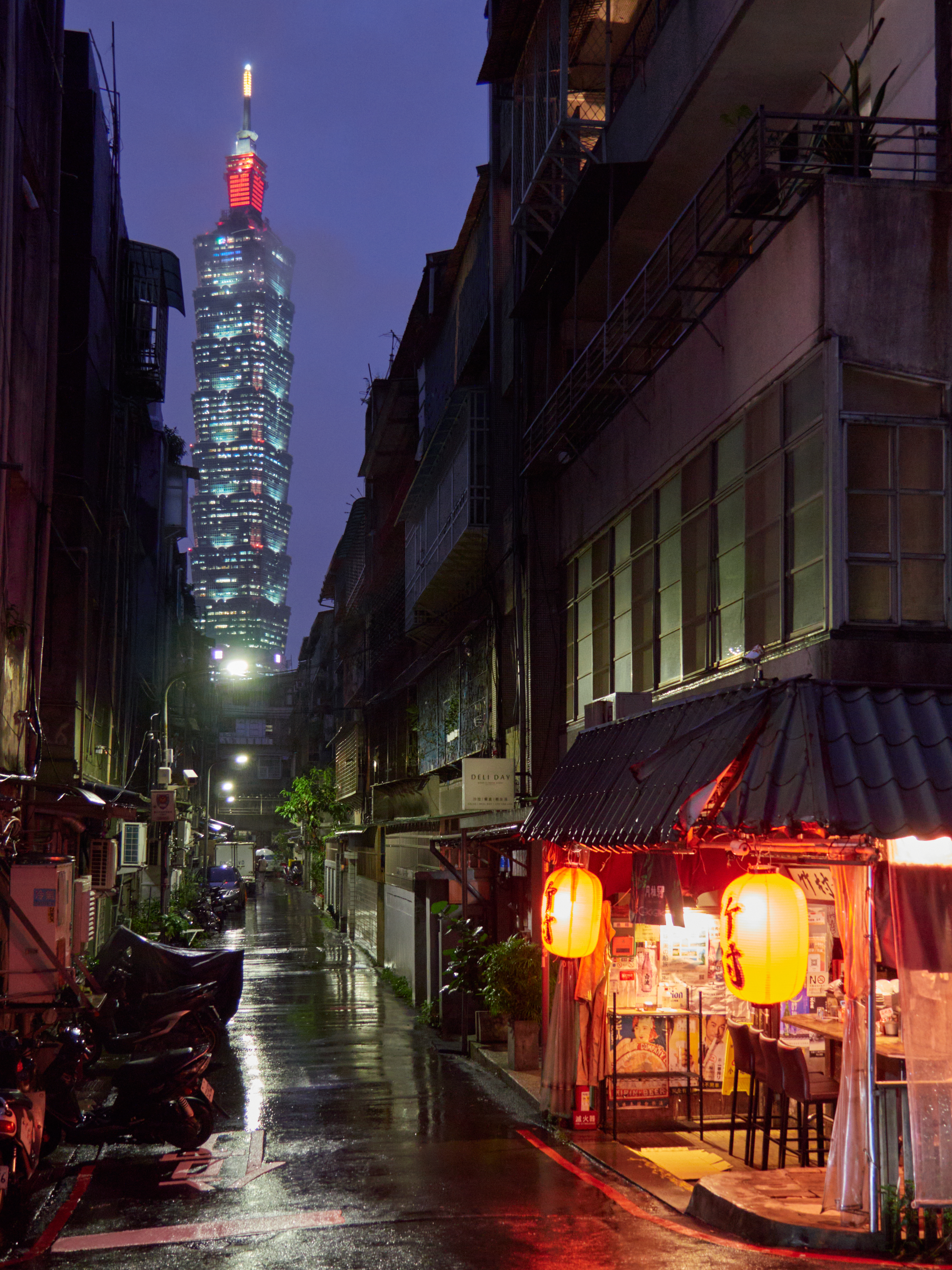

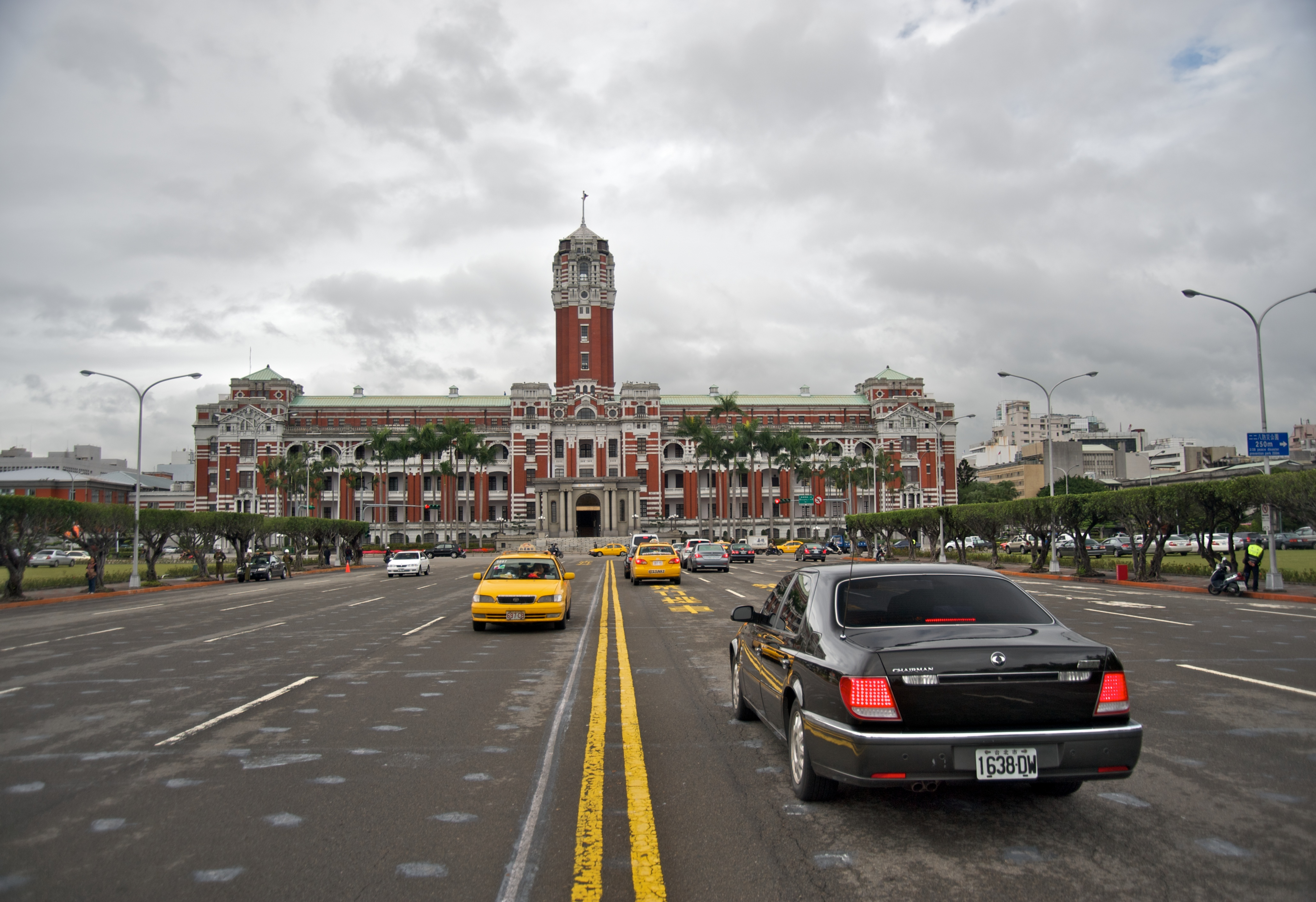
Presidential Office Building from Ketagalan Boulevard

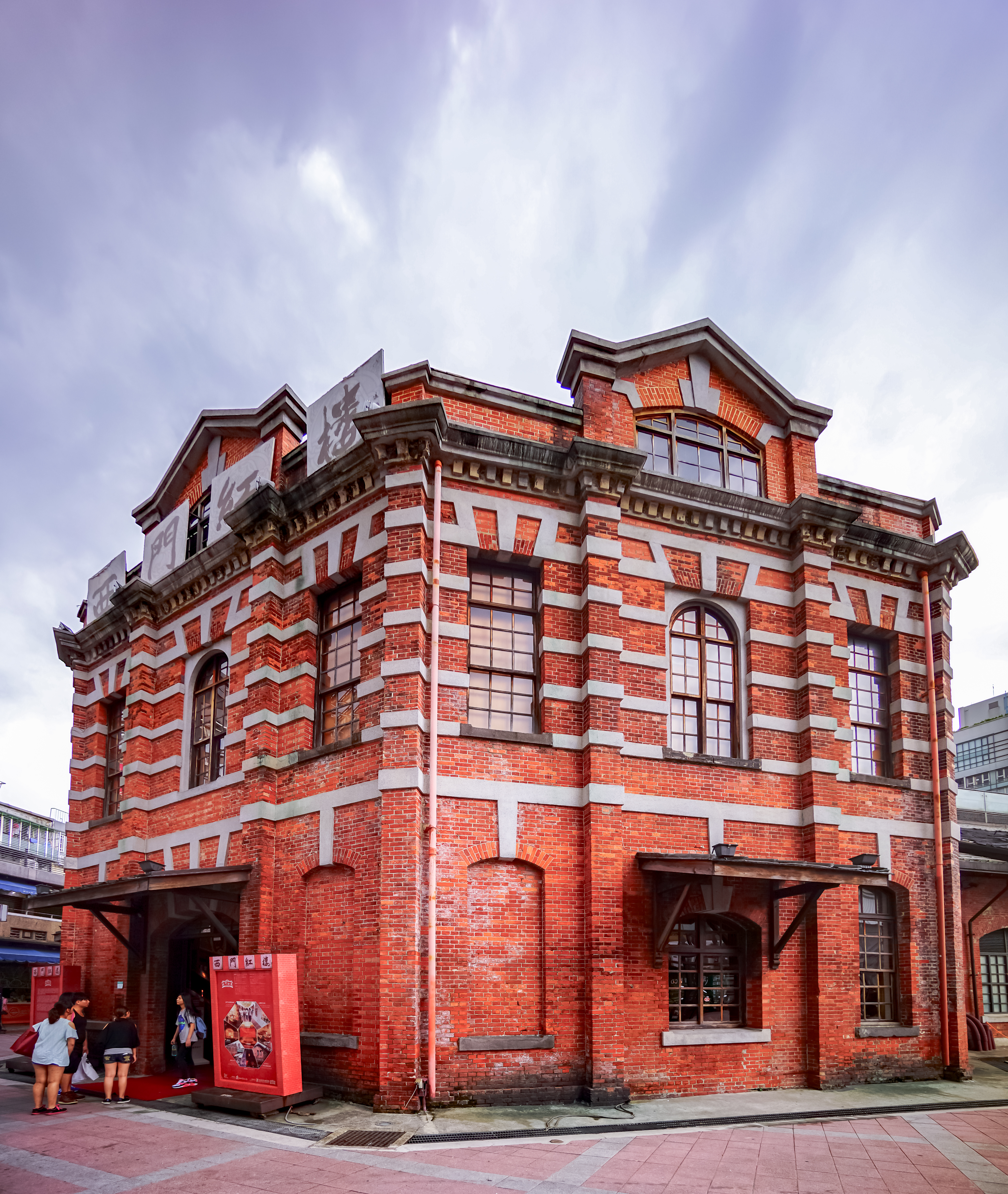
Red House Theater

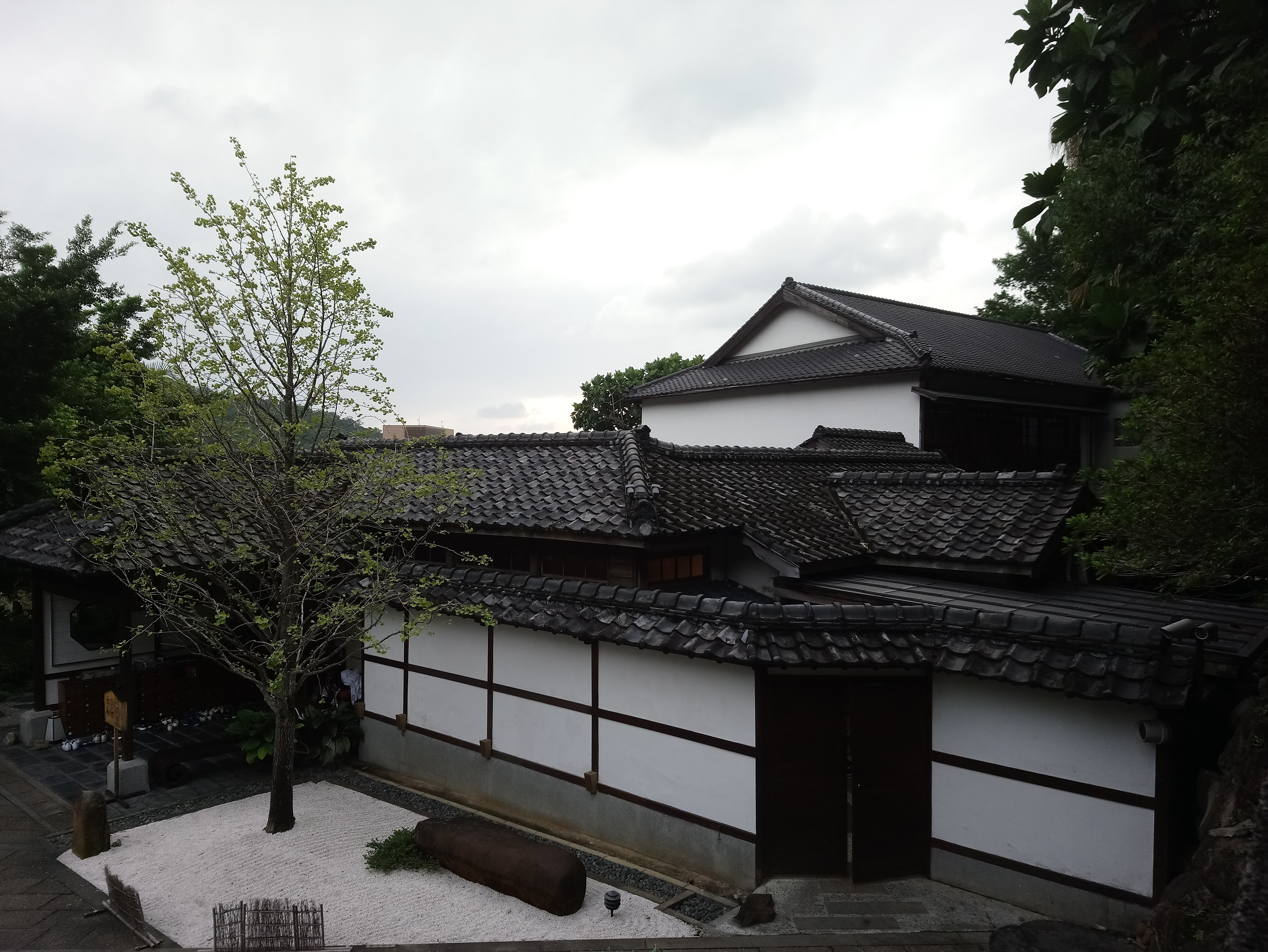
Beitou Museum

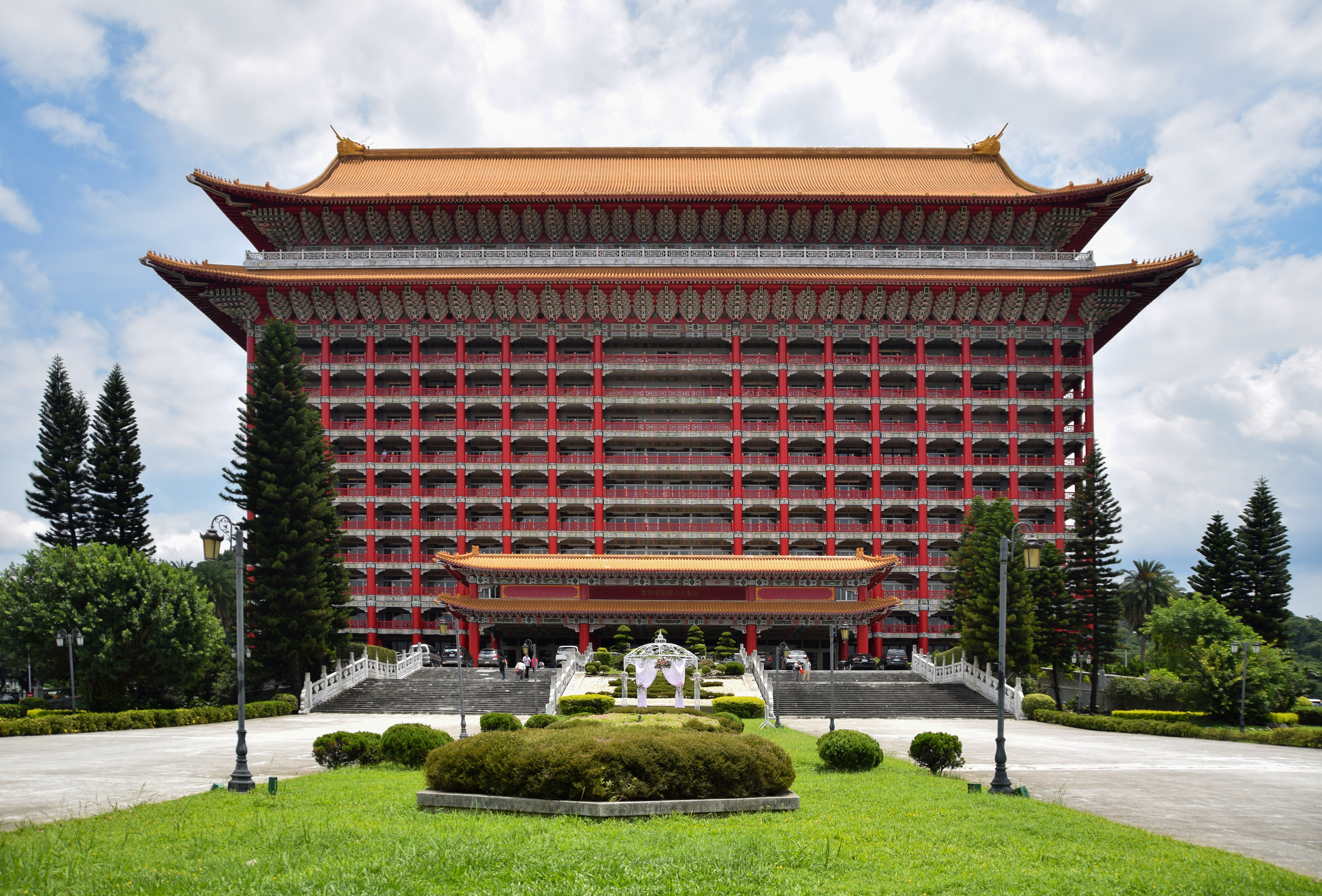
Grand Hotel Taipei

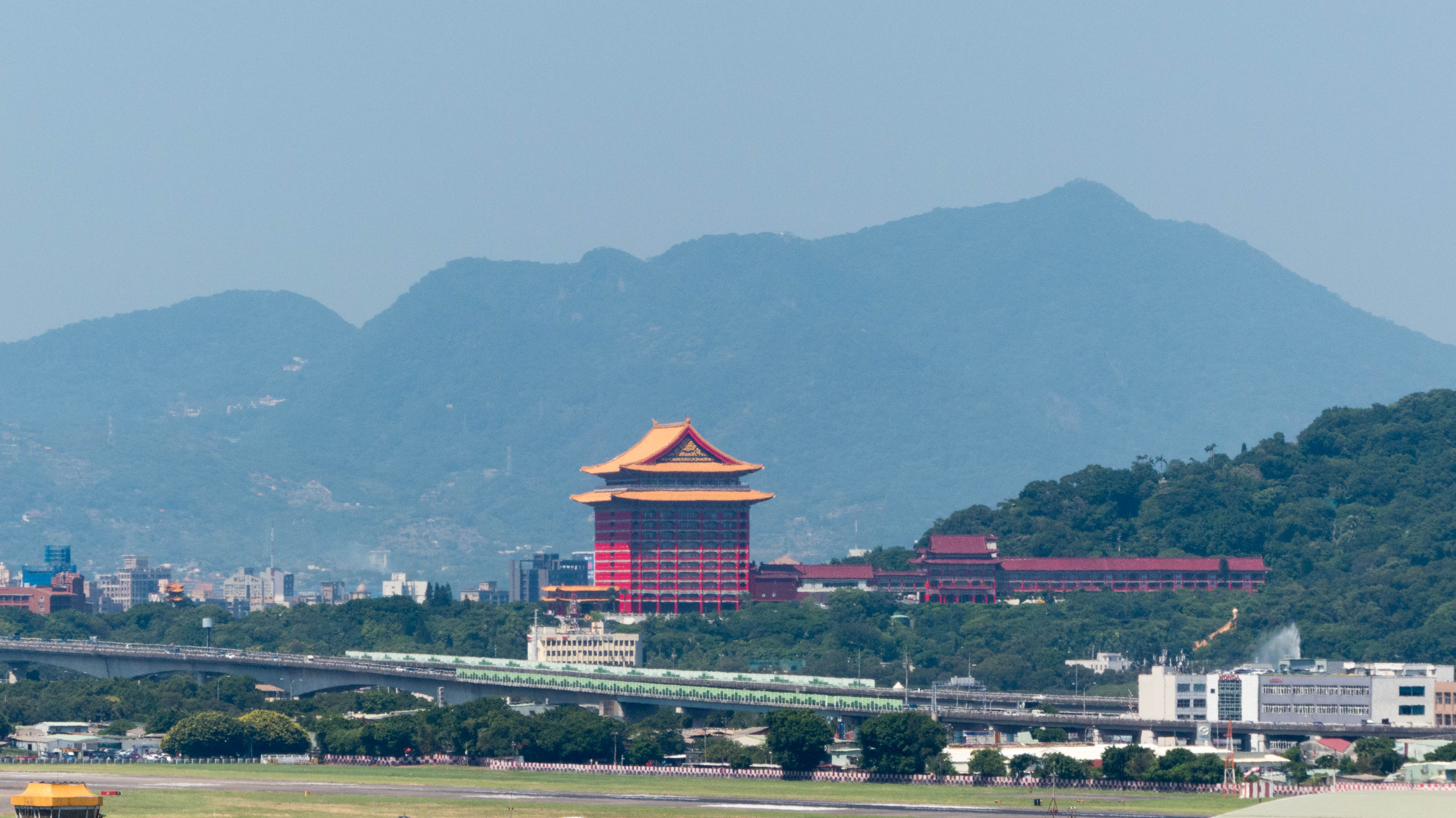
Grand Hotel Taipei

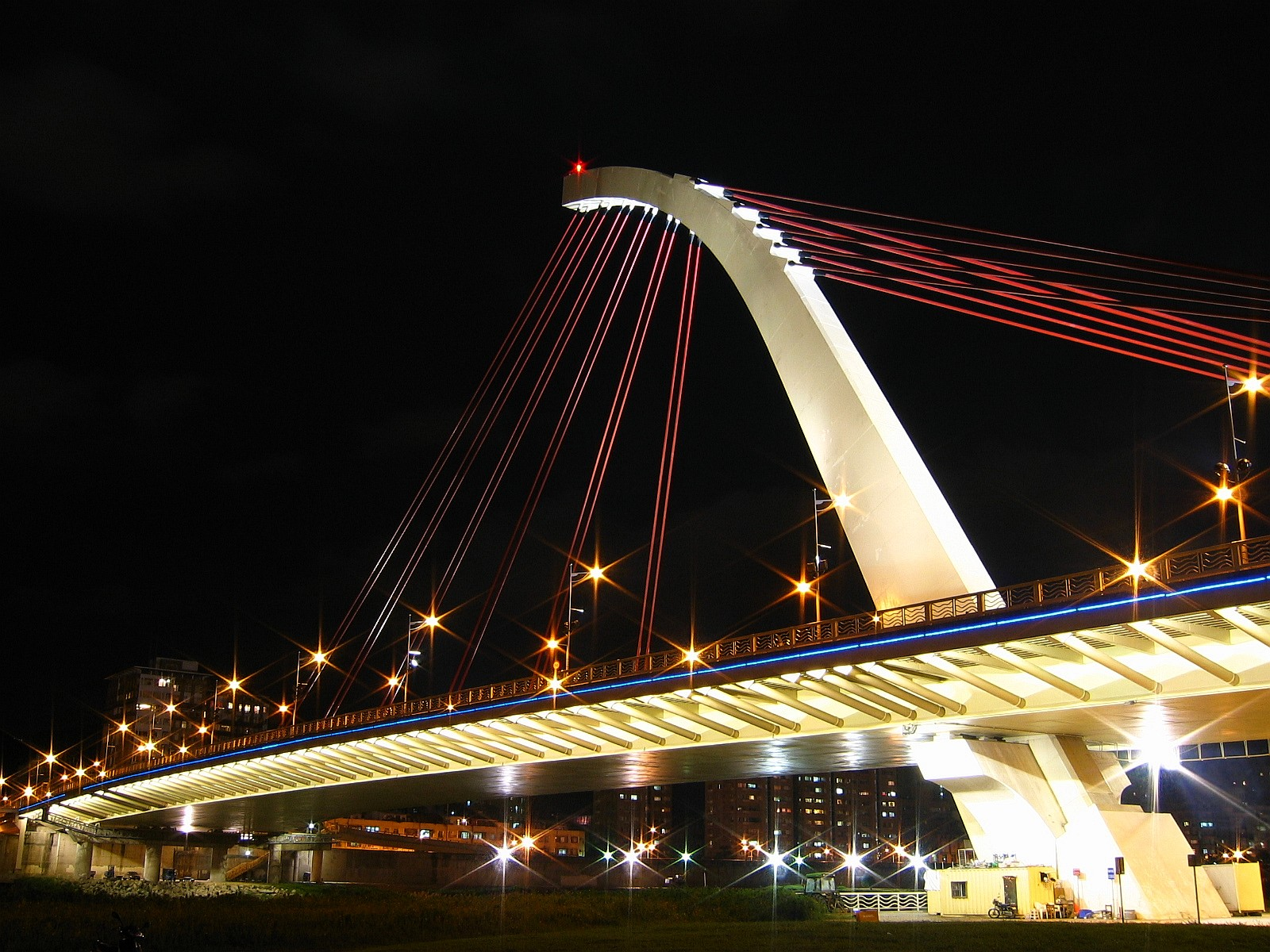
Dazhi Bridge

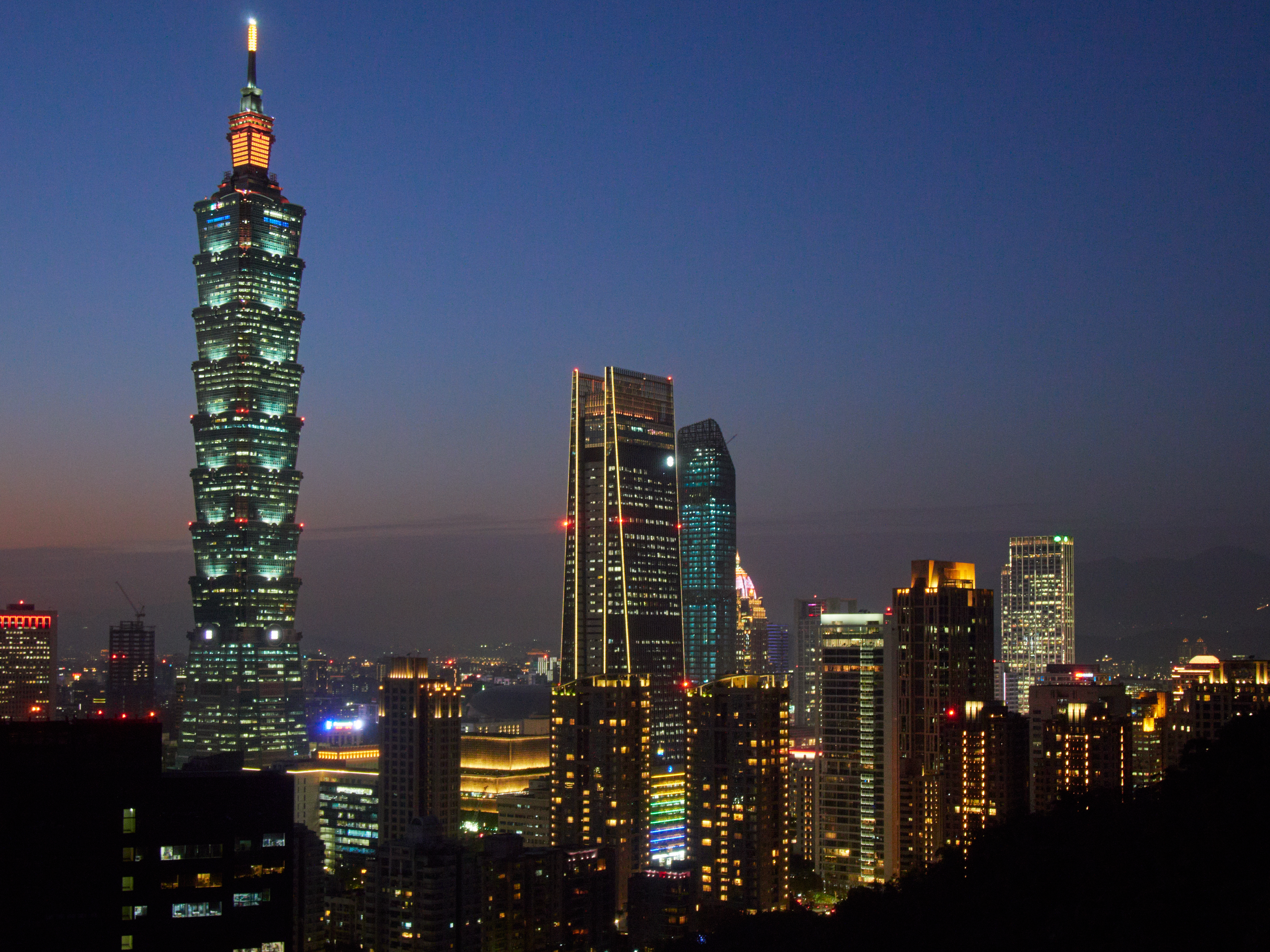
Taipei 101 tower dominates the nighttime skyline of the Xinyi District.

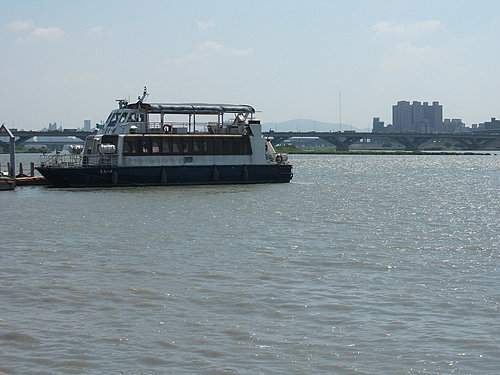
Dadaocheng Wharf, Taipei

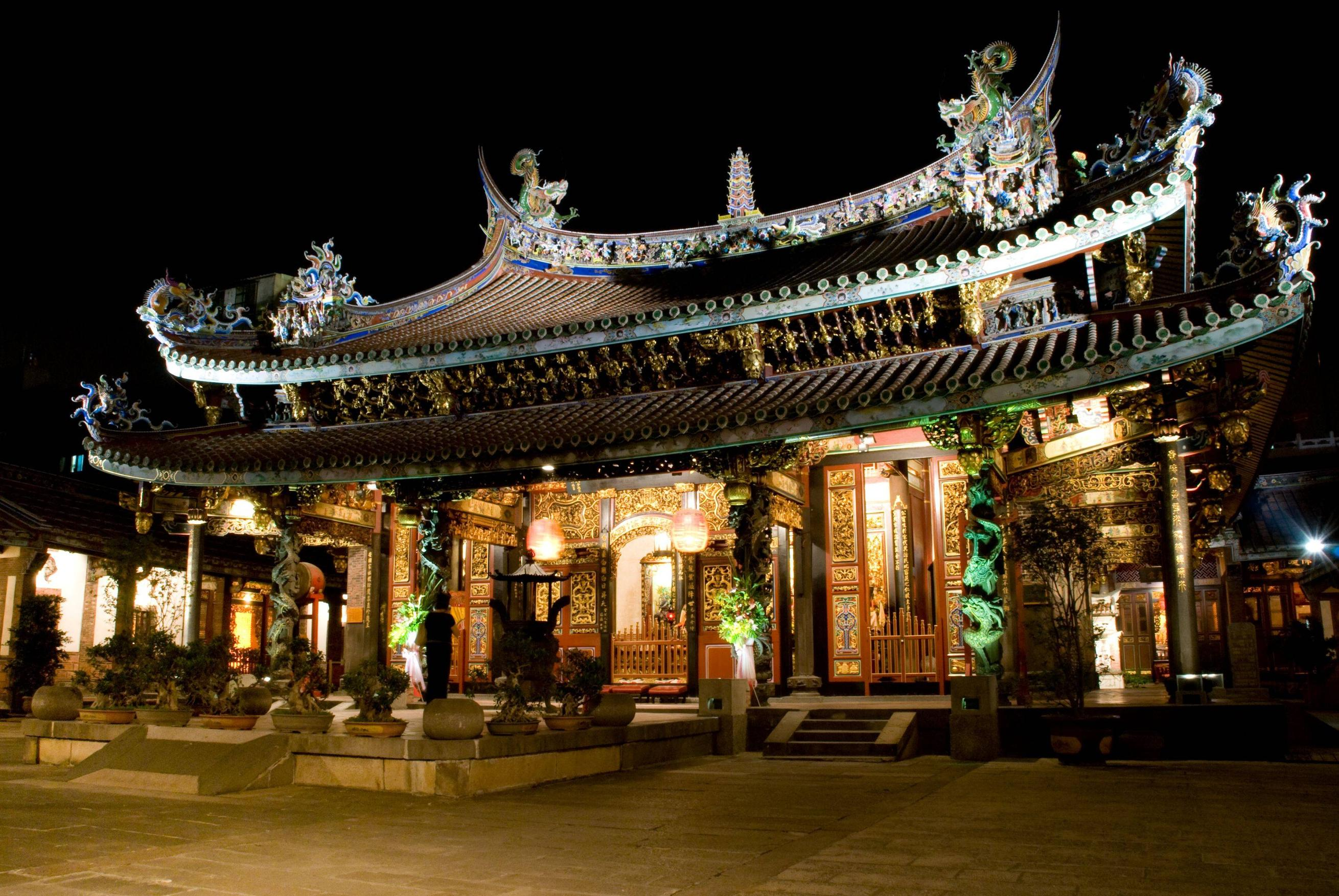
Bao-an Temple

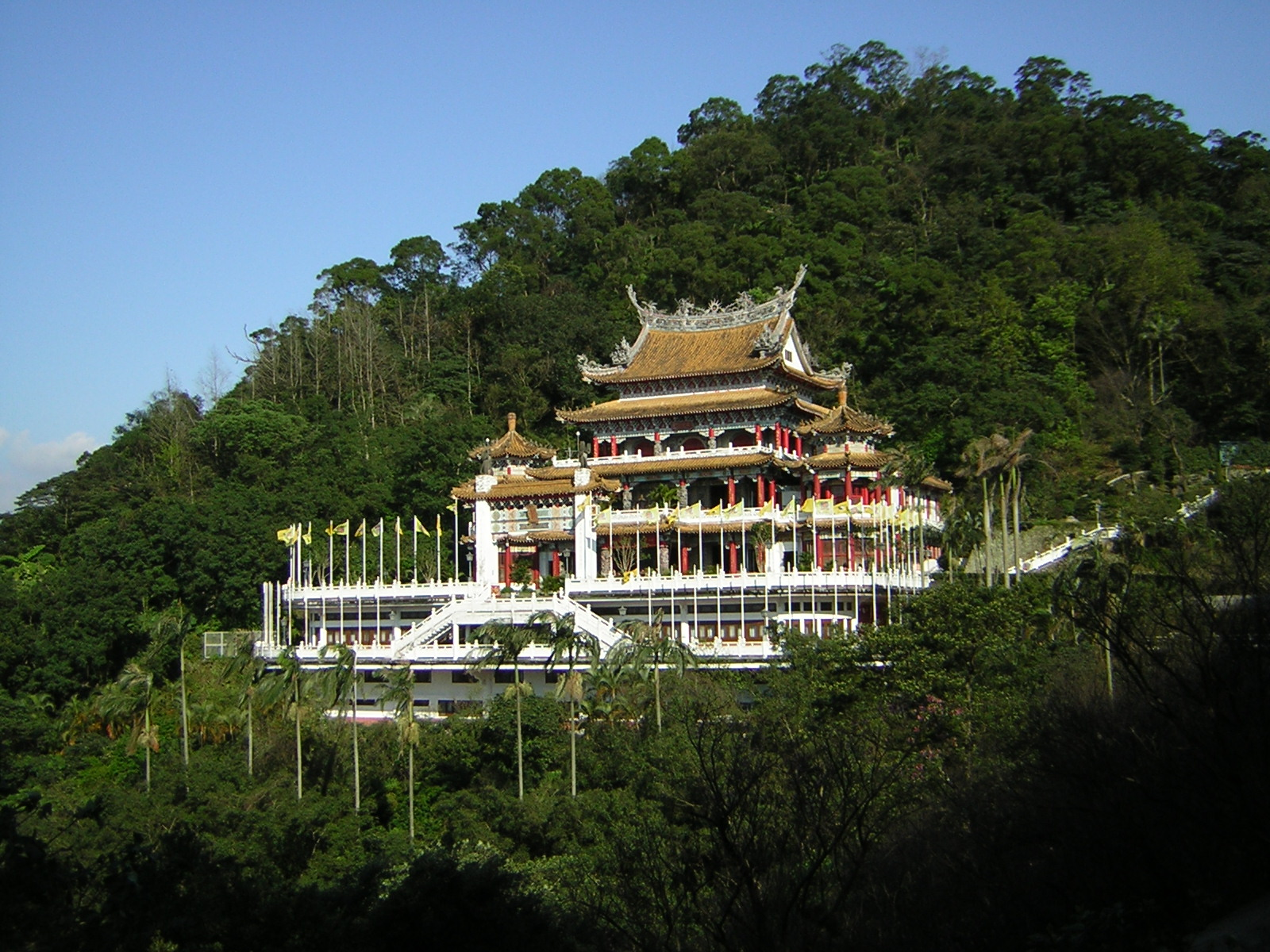
Zhinan Temple

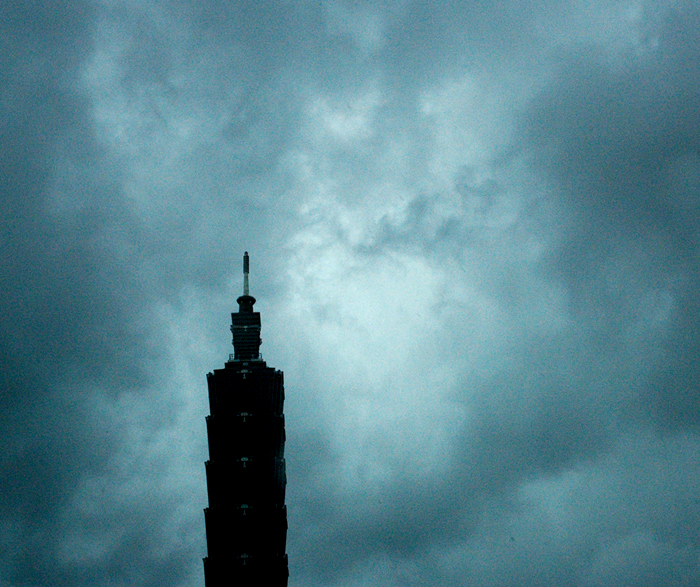
A typhoon makes landfall in Taipei City

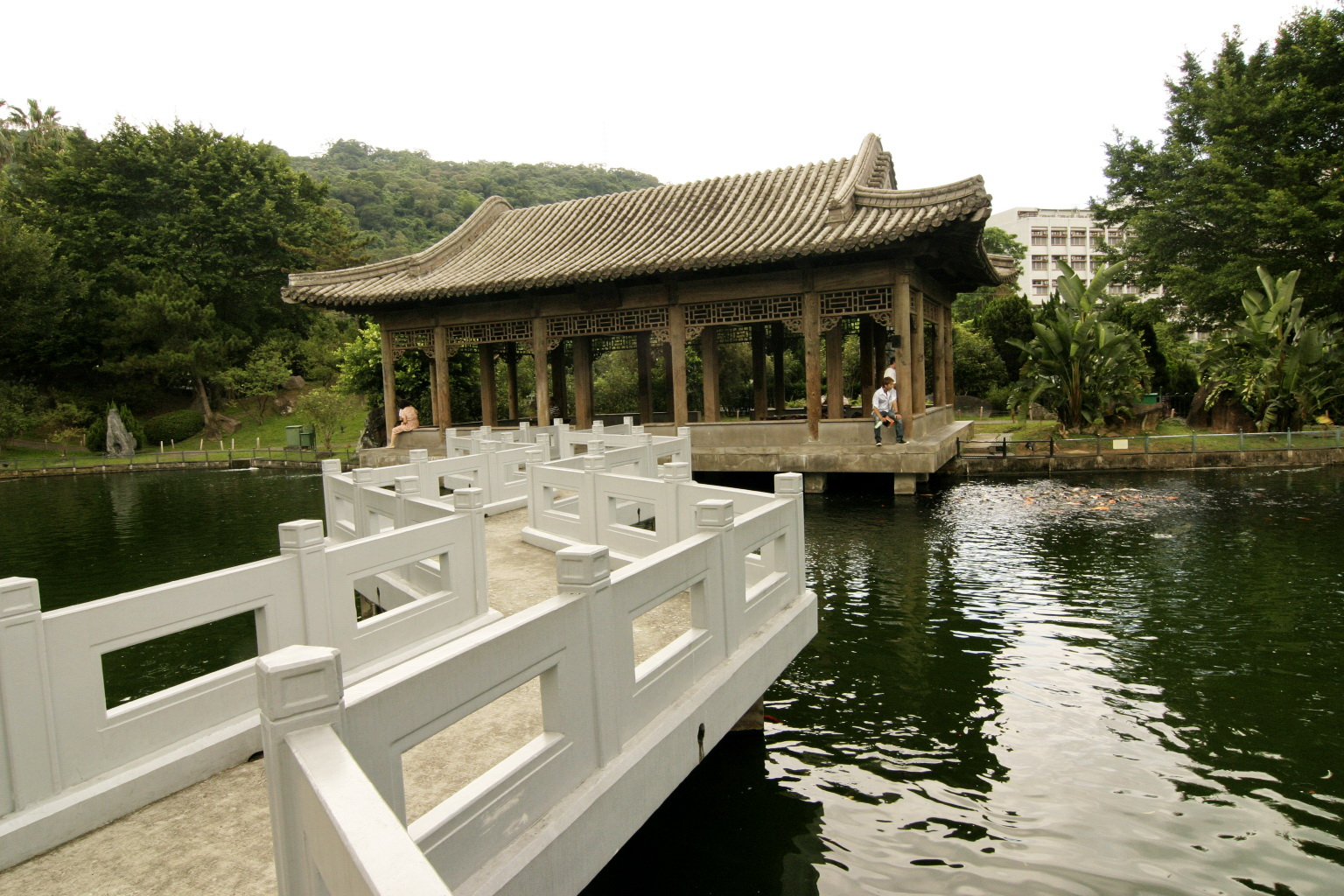
Zhishan Garden at the National Palace Museum

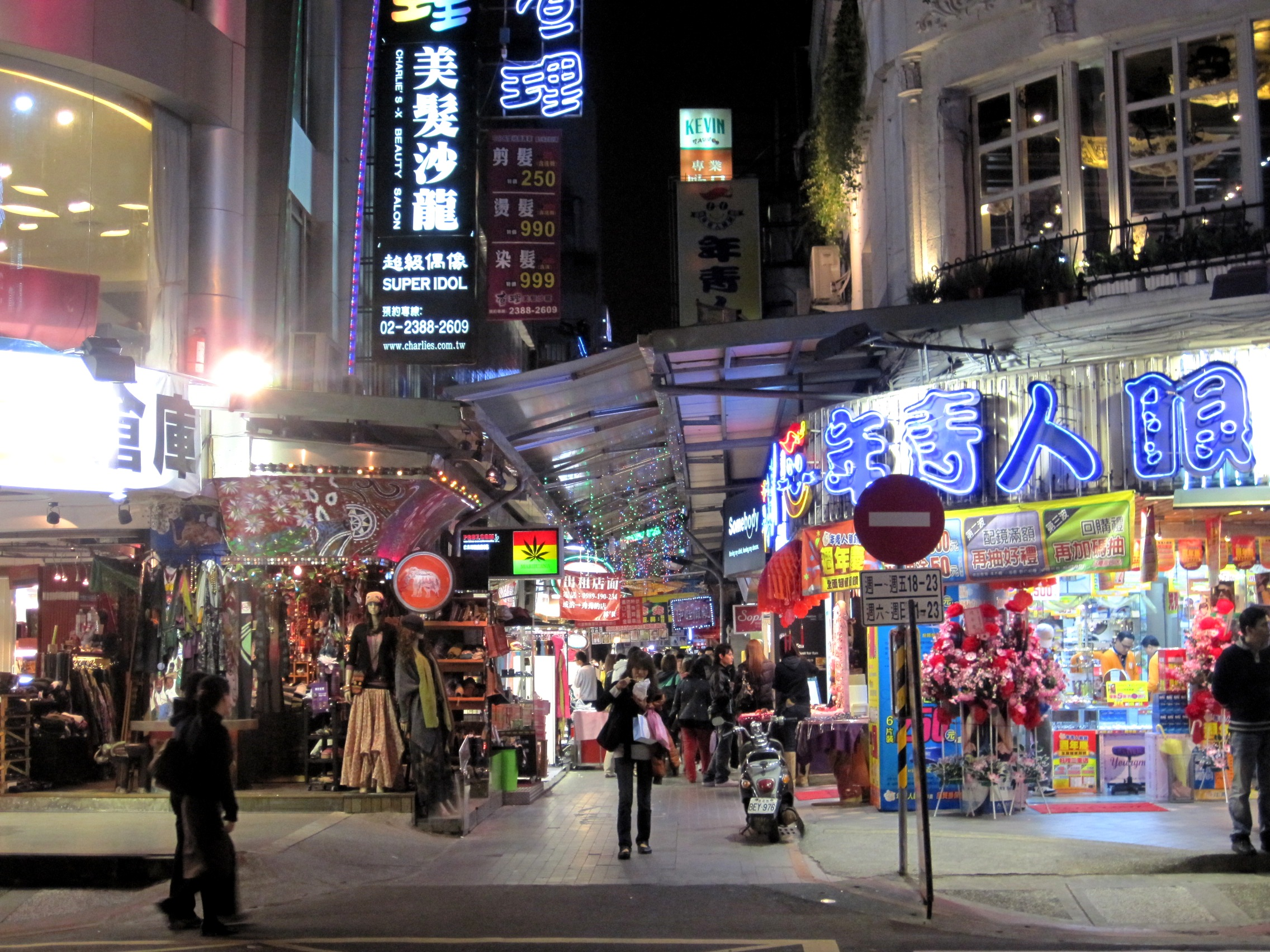
Ximending at night

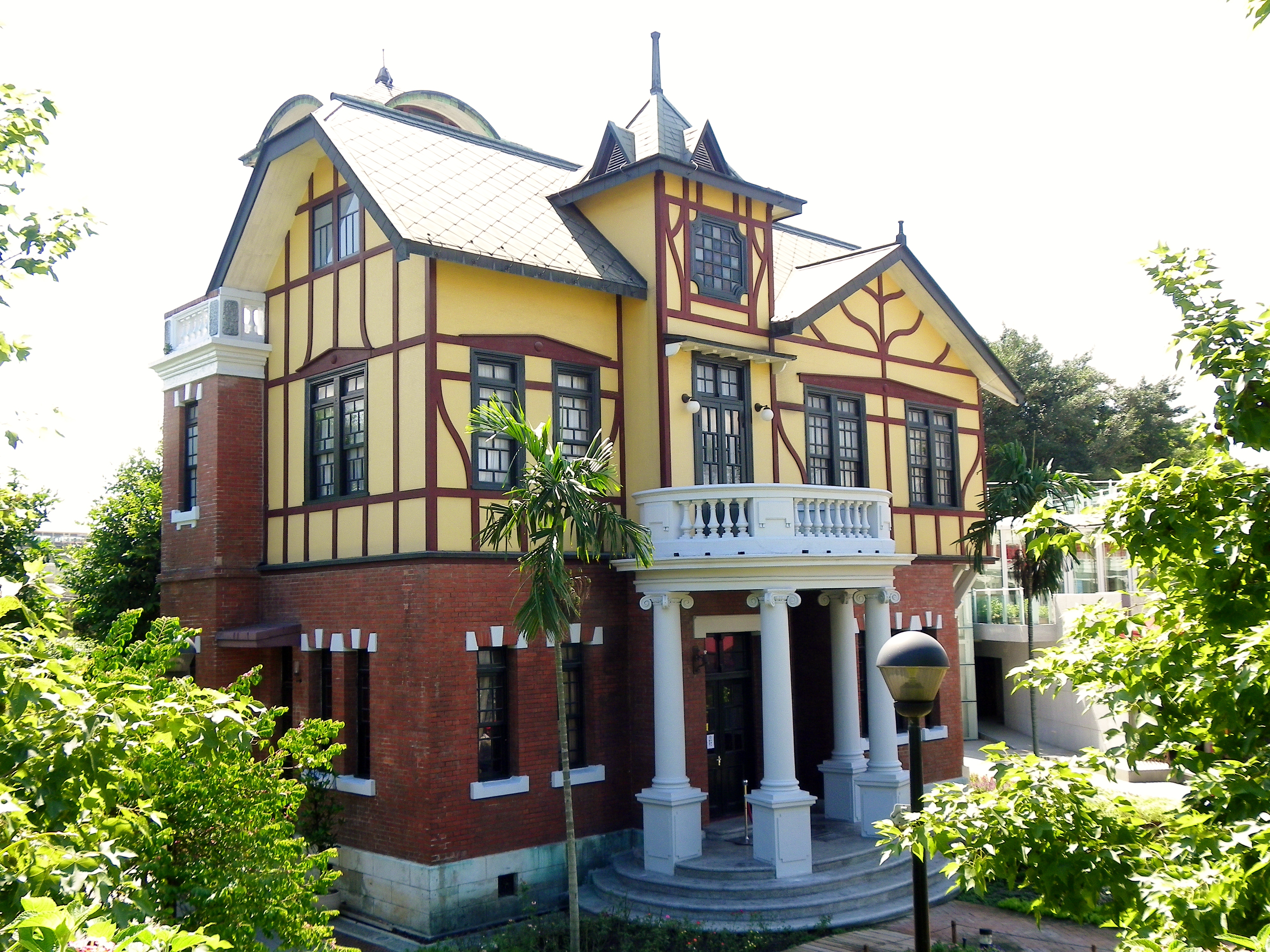
Taipei Story House (Yuanshan Mansion)

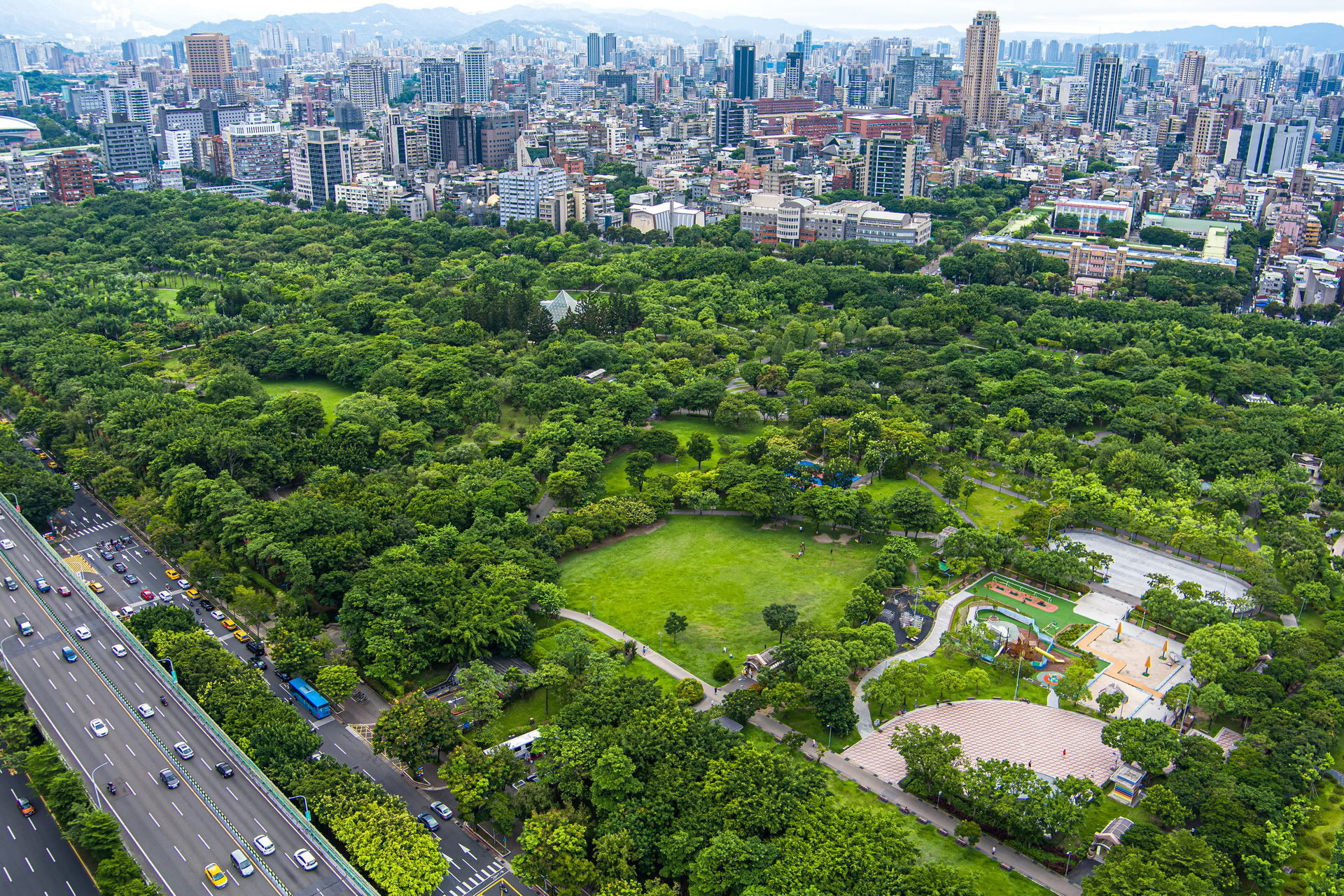
Daan Park

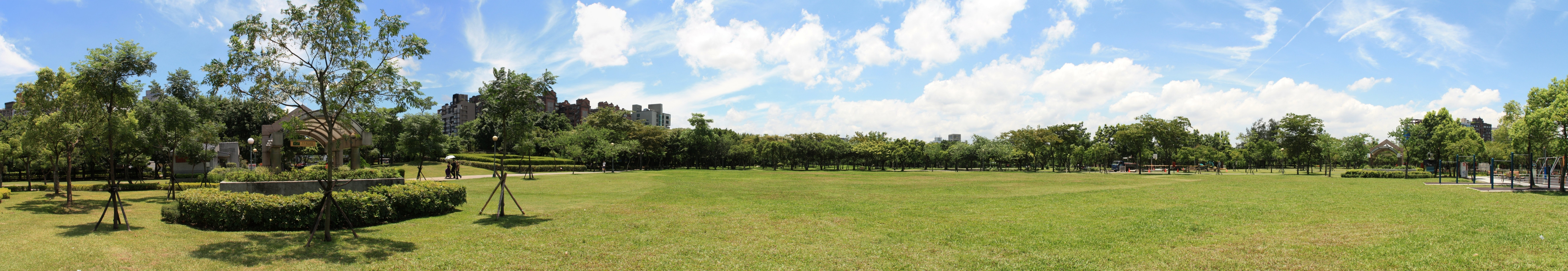
Daan Park

== See also ==
- Taipei-Keelung Metropolitan Area
- List of districts of Taipei by area
- List of districts of Taipei by population
- List of districts of Taipei by population density
- List of schools in Taipei
- List of tallest buildings in Taipei
- Taipei Community Services Center (offers support services to the international community)
- Crime in Taipei

== Notes ==
=== Other ===
Preceded by Nanjing (de facto); Chengdu (until 27 December)	Capital of the Republic of China; 1949–present (de facto) (seat of government)	Most recent
