= List of tourist attractions in Taipei =

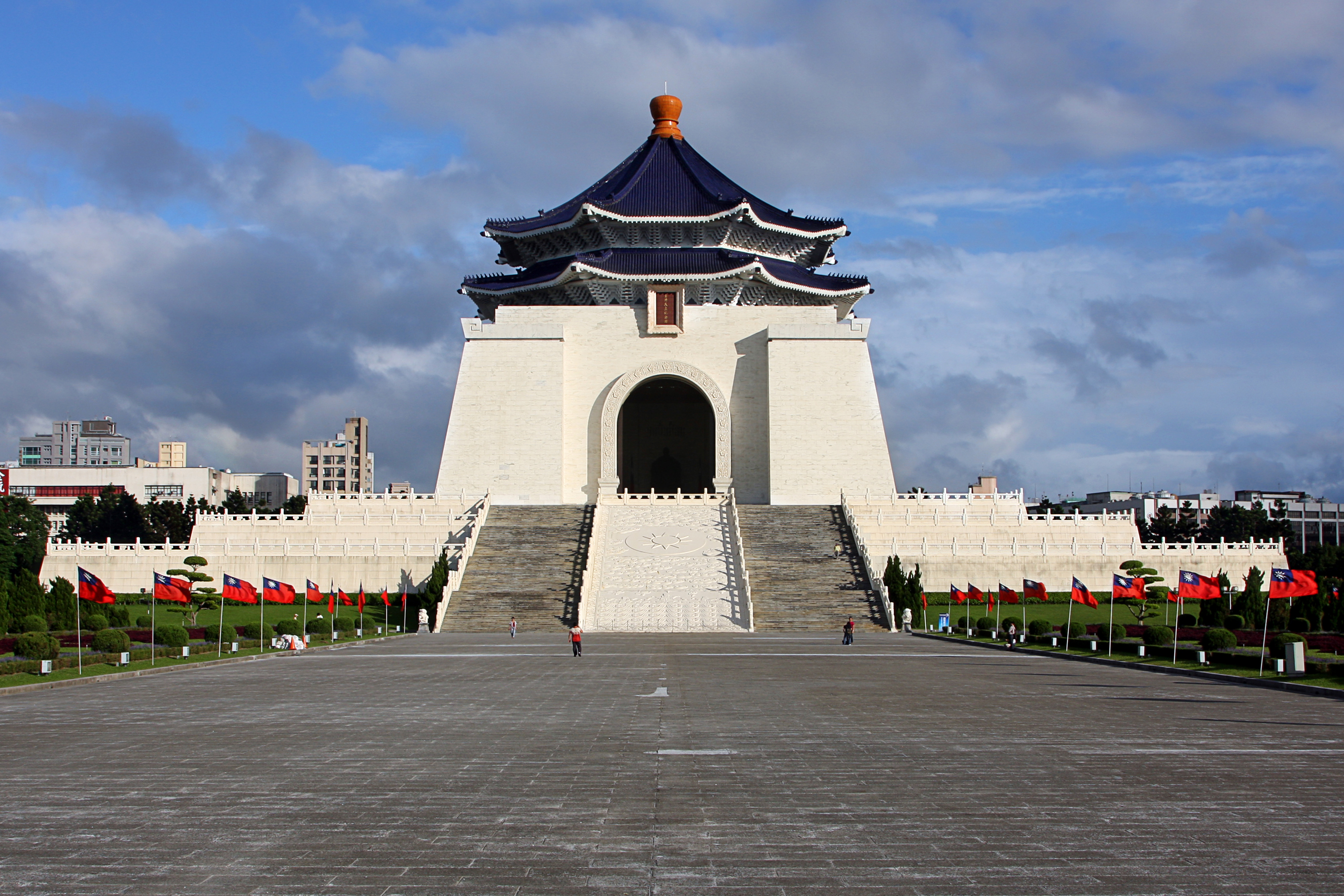
The National Chiang Kai-shek Memorial Hall is a famous monument, landmark, and tourist attraction in Taipei, Taiwan.

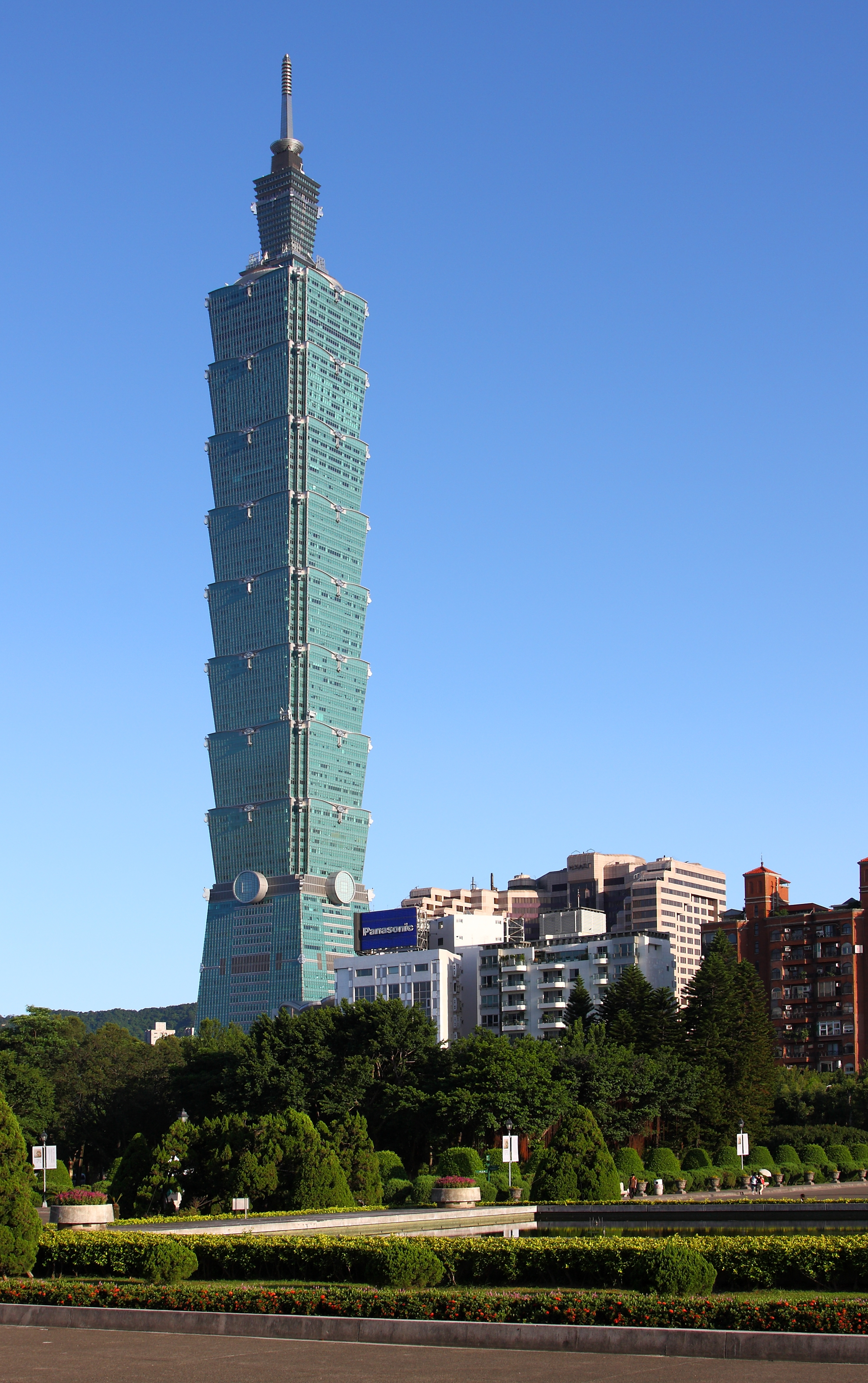
Taipei 101 is a famous landmark, and tourist attraction in Taipei, Taiwan.

This is the list of tourist attractions in Taipei, capital city of Taiwan.

== Notable buildings before 1945 ==
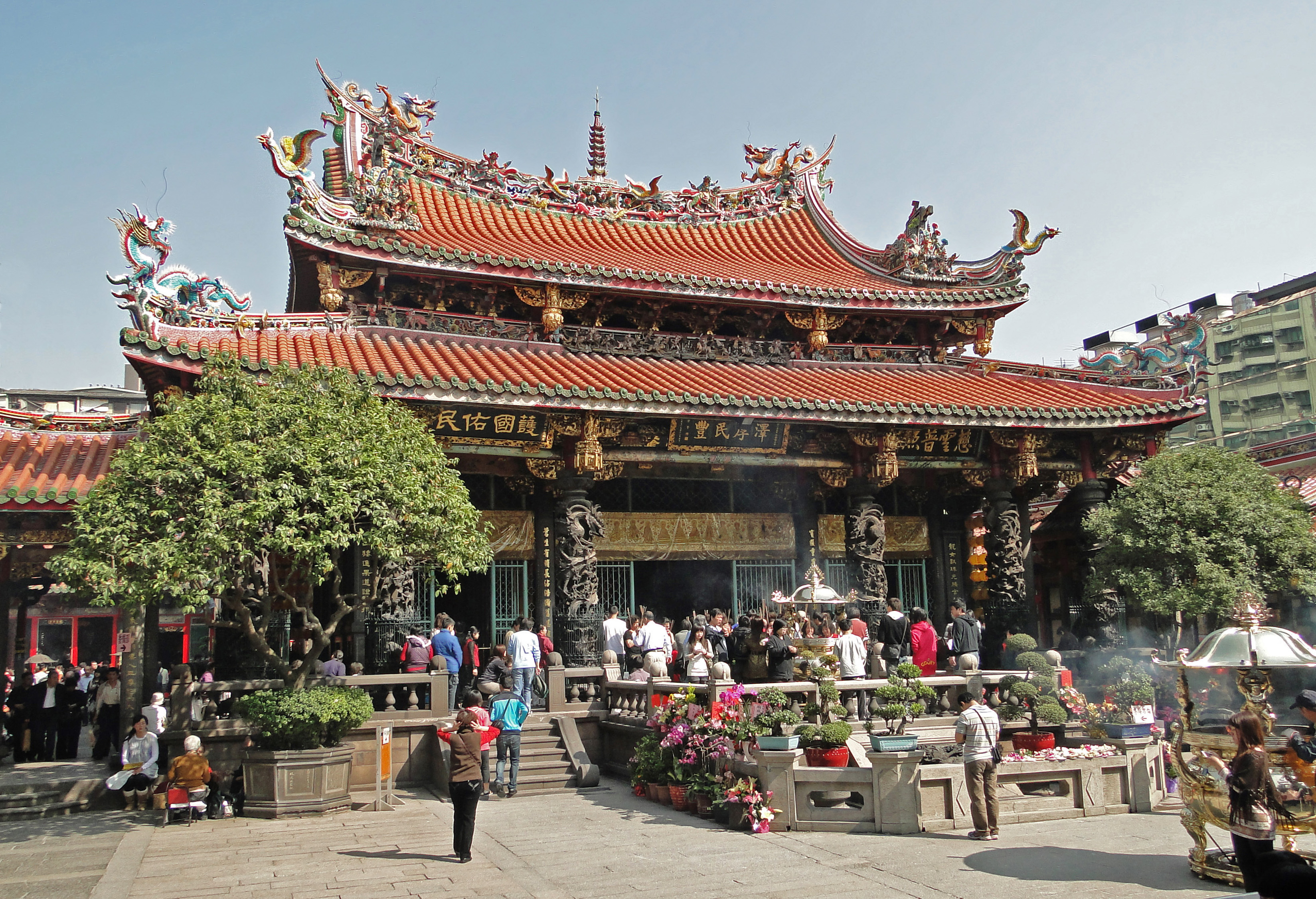
Lungshan Temple was built in 1738.

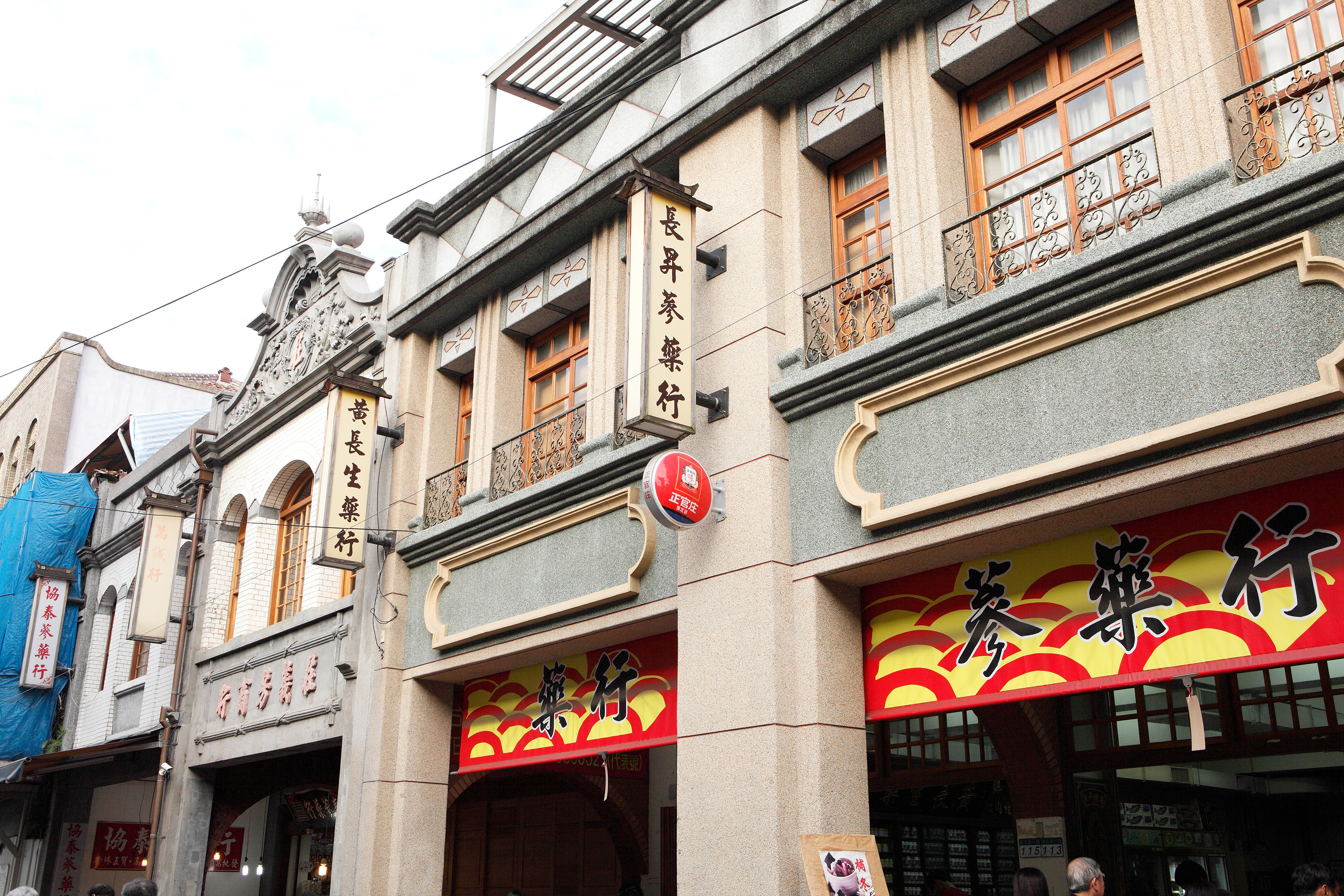
Dihua Street is one of the oldest streets in Taipei, with many Japanese colonial architectures.

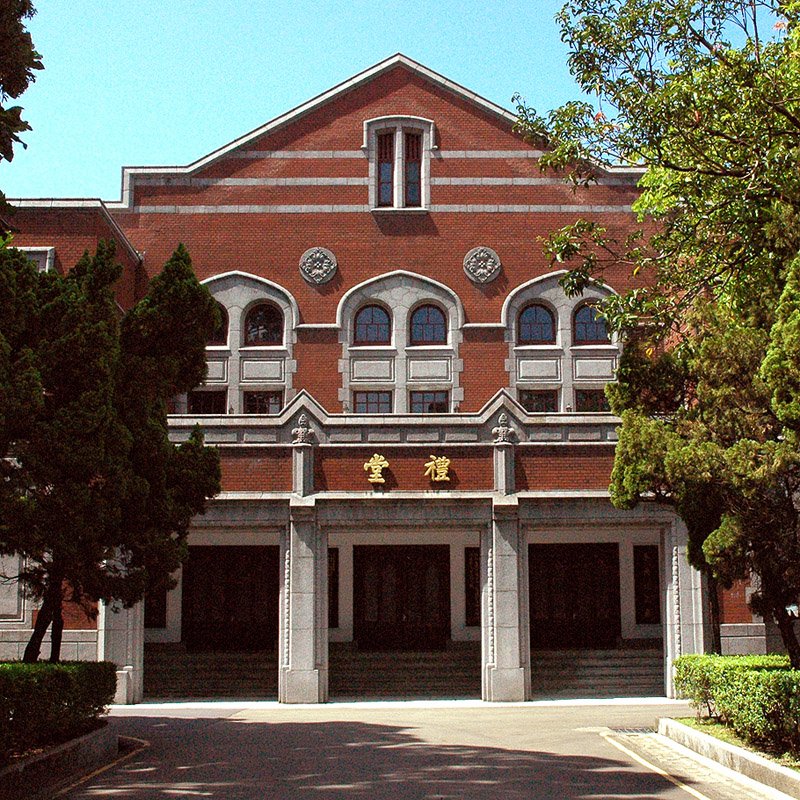
Lecture hall at the National Taiwan Normal University. A number of Taipei campus structures date from Taiwan's period of Japanese rule.

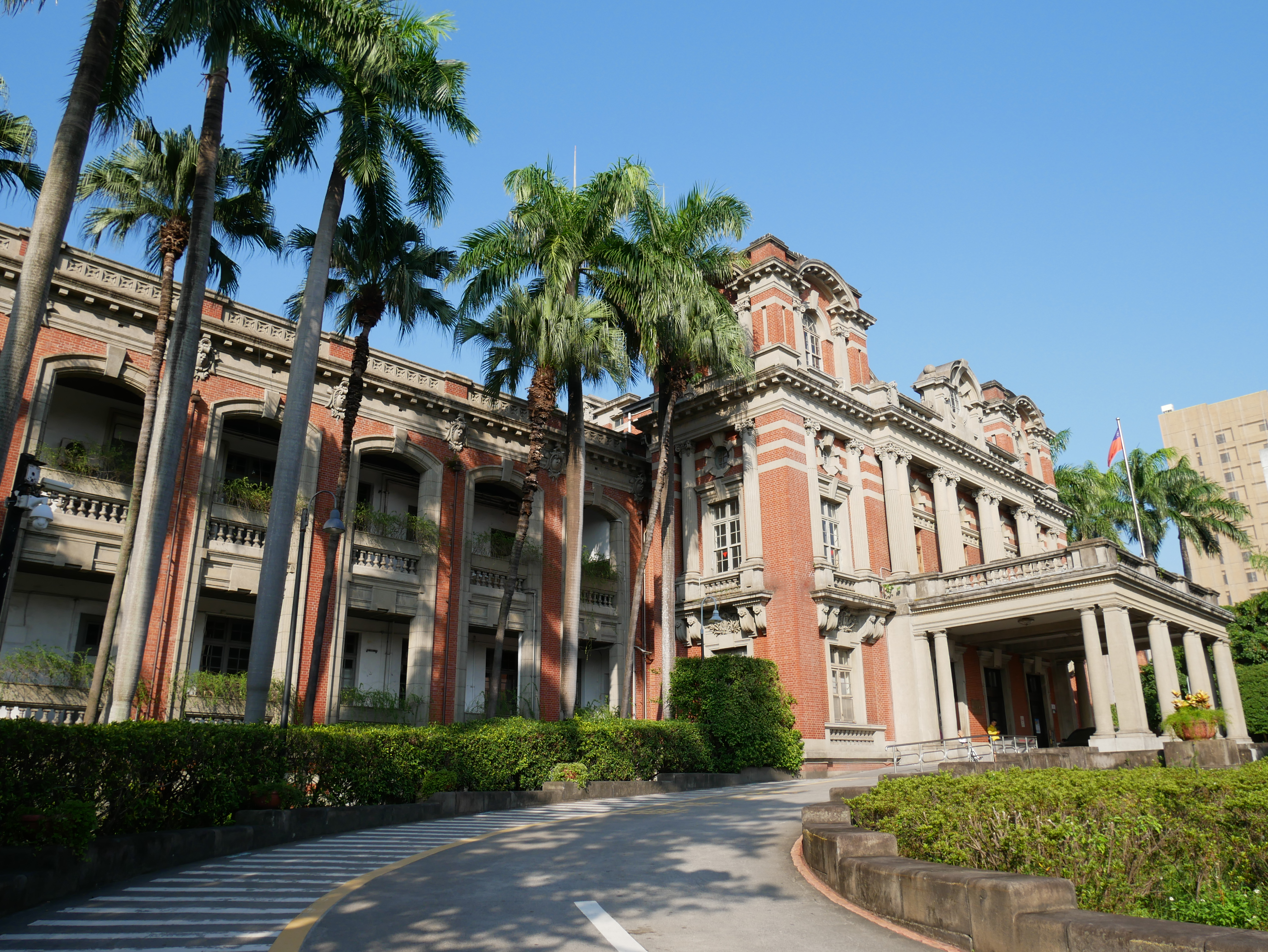
Original home of the National Taiwan University Hospital.

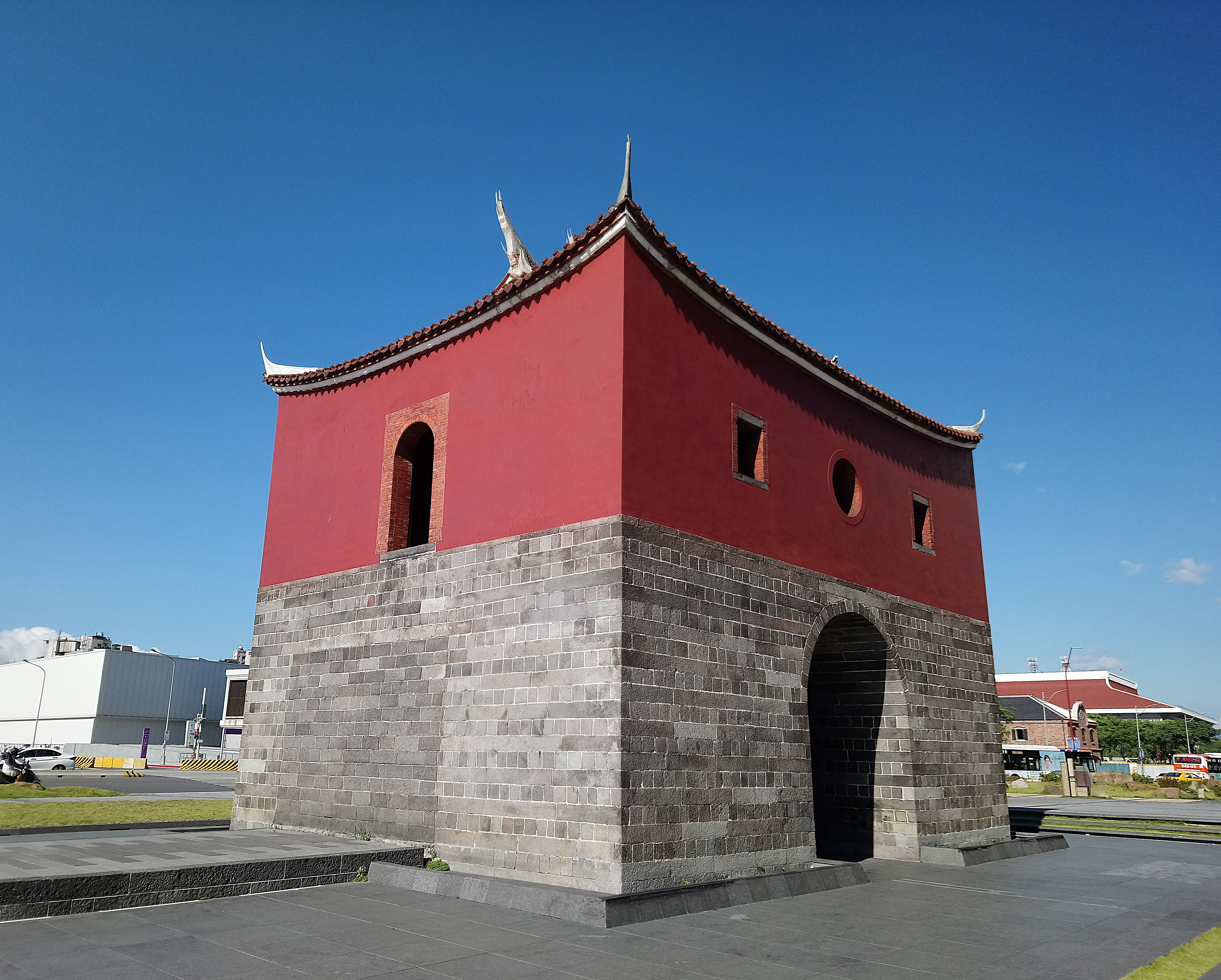
Taipei North Gate

- Bopiliao Historic Block (Wanhua)
- Chih Shan Yen Hui Chi Temple (Shilin)
- Ciyou Temple (Songshan)
- Dalongdong Baoan Temple (Datong)
- Guo Ziyi Memorial Hall
- Guandu Temple (Beitou)
- Lin An Tai Historical House and Museum (Zhongshan)
- Linji Huguo Chan Temple (Zhongshan)
- Lungshan Temple (Wanhua)
- National Taiwan Normal University: Lecture and Recital Hall (Daan/Guting)
- National Taiwan University: Library (Gongguan)
- National Taiwan University: Original Hospital (Zhongzheng)
- Shandao Temple (Zhongzheng)
- North Gate (Zhongzheng)
- Presidential Office Building (Zhongzheng)
- Qingshui Temple (Wanhua)
- Shennong Temple (Shilin)
- Taipei Confucius Temple (Datong)
- Xiahai City God Temple (Datong)
- Ximen Redhouse (Wanhua)
- Yangmingshan Historical Structures
- Zhinan Temple (Wenshan)

== Notable buildings since 1945 ==
- Chiang Kai-shek Memorial Hall at Liberty Square (Zhongzheng)
- Former American Consulate in Taipei (Zhongshan)
- Guling Street Avant-garde Theatre (Zhongzheng)
- National Revolutionary Martyrs' Shrine (Zhongshan)
- National Theater and Concert Hall at Liberty Square (Zhongzheng)
- Nung Chan Monastery (Beitou)
- Shin Kong Life Tower (Zhongzheng)
- Sun Yat-sen Memorial Hall (Xinyi)
- Taipei 101 (Xinyi)
- Xingtian Temple (Zhongshan)

== Museums ==
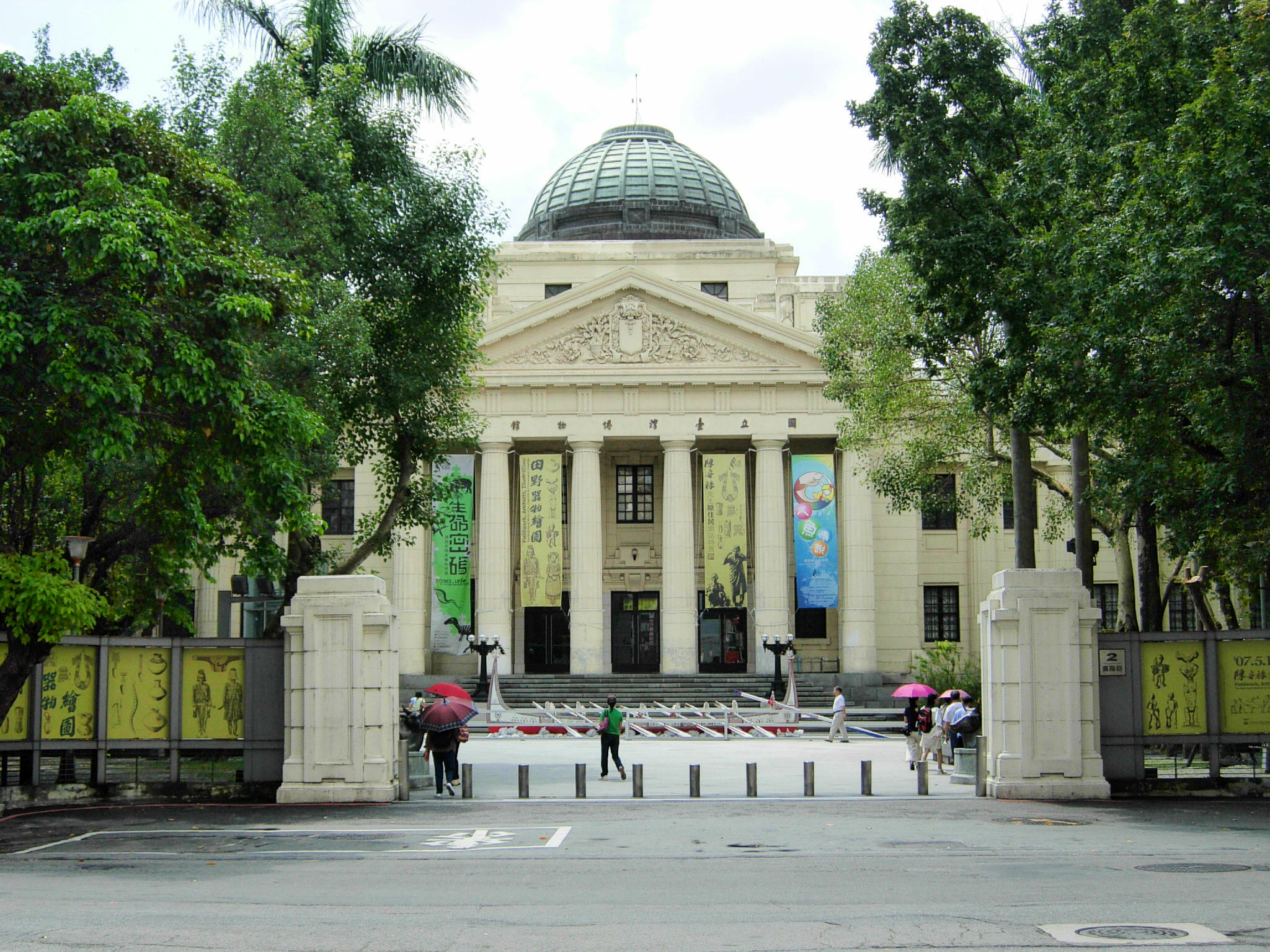
National Taiwan Museum

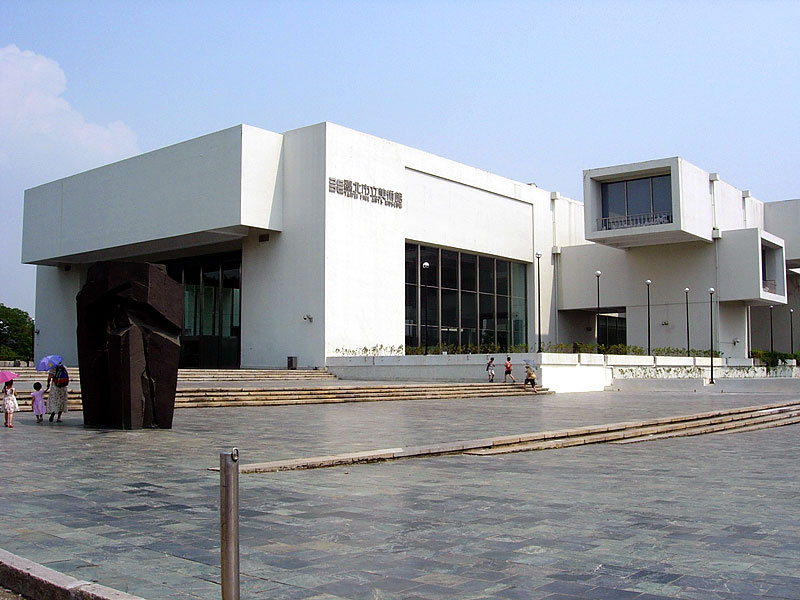
Taipei Fine Arts Museum

- Aurora Art Museum (Songshan)
- Beitou Hot Spring Museum (Beitou)
- Chang Foundation Museum (Zhongzheng)
- Cheng Kung Senior High School Insect Museum (Zhongzheng)
- Cheng Nan-jung Liberty Museum (Songshan)
- Children's Art Museum in Taipei (Shilin)
- Customs Museum (Datong)
- Fire Safety Museum of Taipei City Fire Department (Neihu)
- Hong-gah Museum (Beitou)
- Hwa Kang Museum (Shilin)
- Ketagalan Culture Center (Beitou)
- Lin An Tai Historical House and Museum (Zhongshan)
- Lin Liu-hsin Puppet Theatre Museum (Datong)
- Miniatures Museum of Taiwan (Zhongshan)
- Museum of Contemporary Art Taipei (Datong)
- Museum of the Institute of History and Philosophy, Academia Sinica (Nangang)
- Museum of Jade Art (Zhongshan)
- National Museum of History, Nanhai Campus (Zhongzheng)
- National Palace Museum (Shilin)
- National Taiwan Museum (Zhongzheng)
- National Taiwan Science Education Center (Shilin)
- Postal Museum (Zhongzheng)
- Republic of China Armed Forces Museum (Zhongzheng)
- Shung Ye Museum of Formosan Aborigines (Shilin)
- Suho Memorial Paper Museum (Zhongshan)
- Taipei 228 Memorial Museum (Zhongzheng)
- Taipei Astronomical Museum (Shilin)
- Taipei Fine Arts Museum (Zhongshan)
- Taipei Story House (Zhongshan)
- Taipei Water Park (Zhongzheng)
- Taiwan Folk Arts Museum (Beitou)
- Taiwan Land Reform Museum
- Tittot Glass Art Museum (Beitou)

== Public places ==
- Discovery Center of Taipei (Xinyi)
- Taipei Hakka Culture Hall (Daan)
- Liberty Square: Plaza and Parks

== Urban parks ==
- 228 Peace Memorial Park (Zhongzheng)
- Daan Forest Park (Daan)
- Dahu Park (Neihu)
- Liberty Square: Parks
- Shilin Residence Park and Gardens (Shilin)
- Taipei Botanical Garden (Zhongzheng)
- Taipei Zoo (Wenshan)

== National park and nature preserve ==
- Yangmingshan

== Night markets ==
- Dihua Street (迪化街) (Datong)
- Gongguan Night Market (公館夜市)
- Huaxi Street Tourist Night Market (Snake Alley) (華西街)(Wanhua)
- Jingmei Night Market (景美夜市) (Wenshan)
- Liaoning Street Night Market (遼寧街夜市) (Zhongshan)
- Ningxia Night Market (寧夏夜市) (Datong)
- Raohe Street Night Market (饒河街觀光夜市) (Songshan)
- Shida Night Market (師大夜市) (Daan)
- Shilin Night Market (士林夜市) (Shilin)
- Tonghua Night Market (通化街夜市) (Daan)
- Ximending (西門町) (Wanhua)

== Others ==
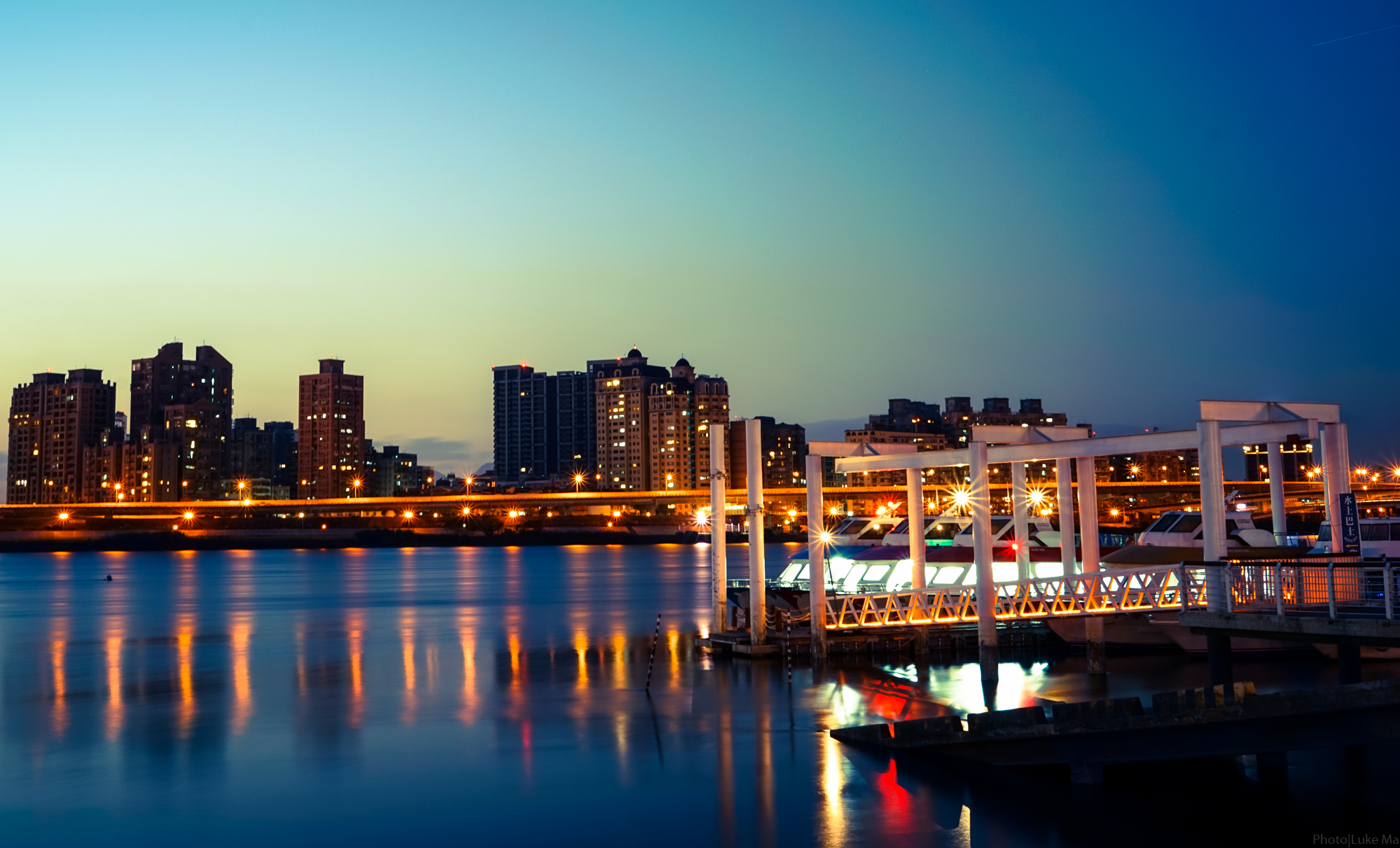
Dadaocheng Wharf, Taipei

- Beitou Hot Springs (Beitou)
- Dihua Street (Datong)
- Dadaocheng Wharf (Datong)
- Maokong (Wenshan)
- Rainbow crossings

== See also ==
- List of tourist attractions in Taiwan
