= Zhinan Temple =

Taoist temple in Taipei, Taiwan

- Chinese: 指南宮
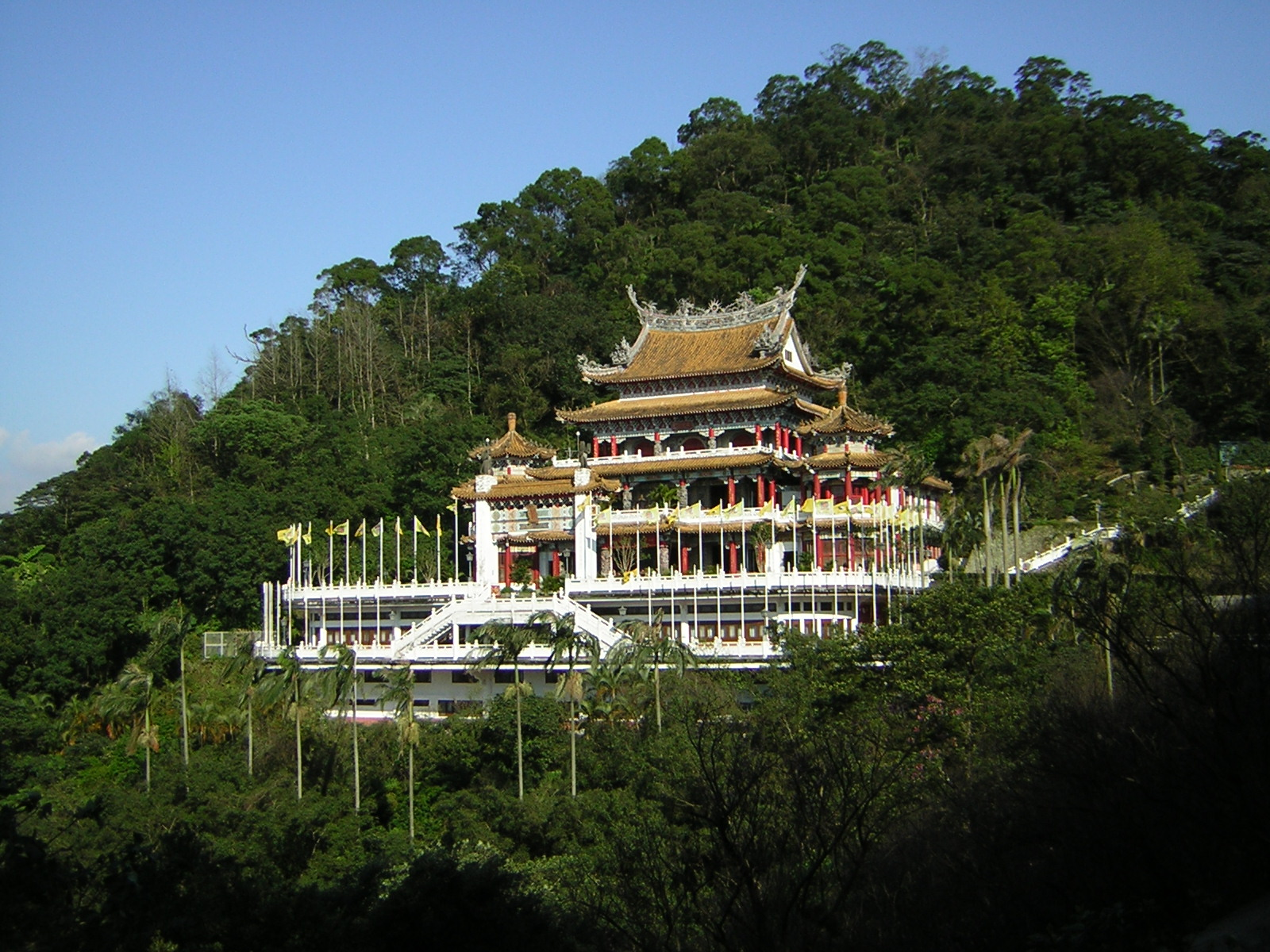
- Lingxiao Chapel of Zhinan Temple

- Location within Taiwan

Religion
- Affiliation: Taoism
- District: Wenshan District
- Status: Active

Location
- Municipality: Taipei City
- State: Taiwan
- Coordinates: 24.9792°N 121.587°E

Architecture
- Style: Southern Chinese
- Completed: 1890

Website
- www.chih-nan-temple.org

Zhinan Temple (Chinese: 指南宮; pinyin: Zhǐnán Gōng; also called Chinese: 仙公廟, Xiāngōng Miào; also anglicized as "Chihnan" or "Jhihnan") is a Taoist temple on the slopes of Houshan (猴山, "Monkey Mountain") in Wenshan District of Taipei, Taiwan. It was founded in 1882. The temple's main deity is Lü Dongbin, one of the Eight Immortals. As Lü is said to dwell in the southern courtyard of the heavenly court, the temple acts as a compass pointing toward the south (指南, zhǐnán); hence the name.

== Overview ==
Popular folklore holds that unmarried couples who visit the temple together will break up. One explanation is that Lü Dongbin, famous for his Taoist sexual prowess, can be counted upon to seduce any unmarried woman (older versions specify that she must be a virgin). Another is that since Lü Dongbin's love for Immortal Woman He went unanswered, he is jealous of lovers.

Zhinan Temple is famous for its stairway of "1000" steps. (This is to the Yuanzhen Pond and the Tudigong shrine; the gate of the Chunyang Chapel requires a further 300 steps.) The New Song of the Black Cat and Black Dog, released in 1932, is an about a couple who visit Zhinan Temple to pray for their marriage. The dual protagonists of Brother Liu and Brother Wang on the Roads in Taiwan make Zhinan Temple the first stop of their tour of Taiwan.

== Layout ==
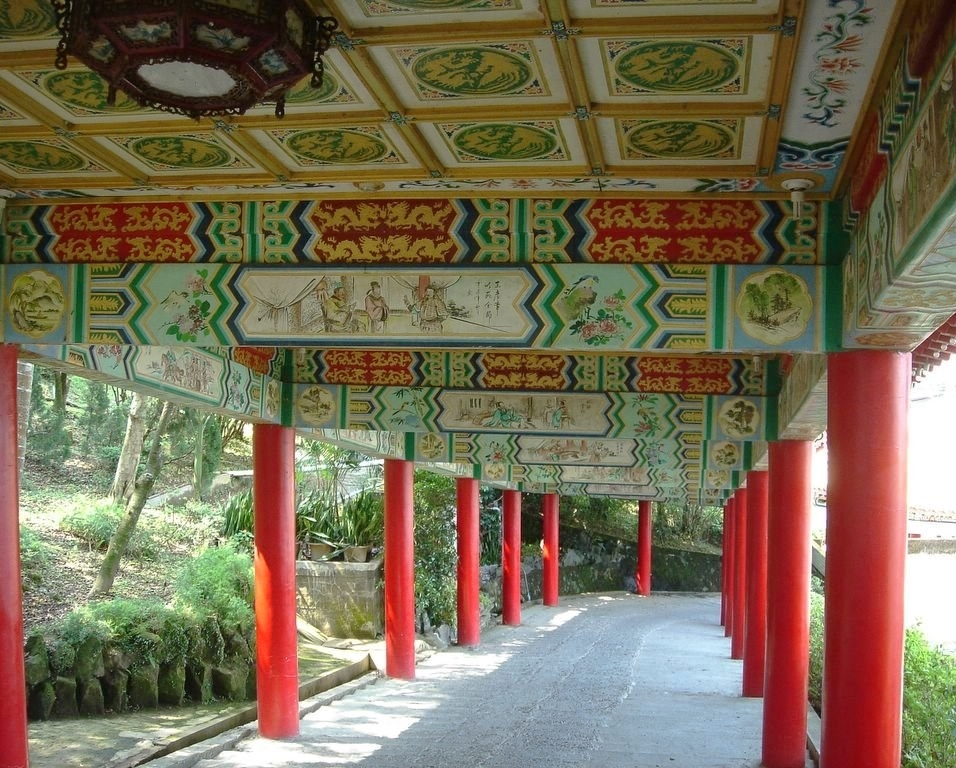
Long Corridor leading to Lingxiao Chapel

The oldest part of the temple is the Chunyang Chapel, constructed in 1890. Funding came from gold miners working in Jinshan. This shrine houses a statue of Lü Dongbin, founder of the Chunyang (純陽, "Pure Yang") sect of Quanzhen ("Complete Perfection") Taoism. The present statue was a 2002 gift from Zhinan's "home temple," Yongle Temple in Shanxi province.

Facing the Chunyang Chapel, to the left is the Lingxiao Chapel (built 1963–1966). The main deities are the Jade Emperor (on the top floor) and the Three Pure Ones (on the ground floor). Below these may be found the classrooms and offices of the China Taoism Institute (Zhonghua Daojiao Xueyuan), a Quanzhen seminary granting (unrecognized) two-year BA and MA degrees in Taoism.

To the right of the Chunyang Chapel is the Buddhist-themed Daxiong Chapel (built 1973). A black statue of Sakyamuni Buddha was the gift of a Thai military officer who, while exiled to Taiwan, vowed to donate such a statue in the event that he returned to power.

Behind the Lingxiao Chapel is the much smaller Dacheng Chapel, dedicated to Confucius.

== Transportation ==
The temple is accessible via Zhinan Temple Station of Maokong Gondola. Several bus routes also serve the temple, especially No. 530 from Zhinan Bus Company. Access by cable car was available between 2007 and 2008, was then suspended due to erosion-related structural problems, and has since been restored.

== See also ==
- Taoism & Three teachings
- Bangka Lungshan Temple, Wanhua District
- Bangka Qingshui Temple, Wanhua District
- Ciyou Temple, Songshan District
- Dalongdong Baoan Temple, Datong District
- Xingtian Temple, Zhongshan District
- Guandu Temple, Beitou District
- Xizhi Gongbei Temple, Xizhi, New Taipei
- List of temples in Taiwan
- List of tourist attractions in Taiwan
