= Taipei Confucius Temple =

Temple in Datong, Taipei, Taiwan

- 臺北孔子廟
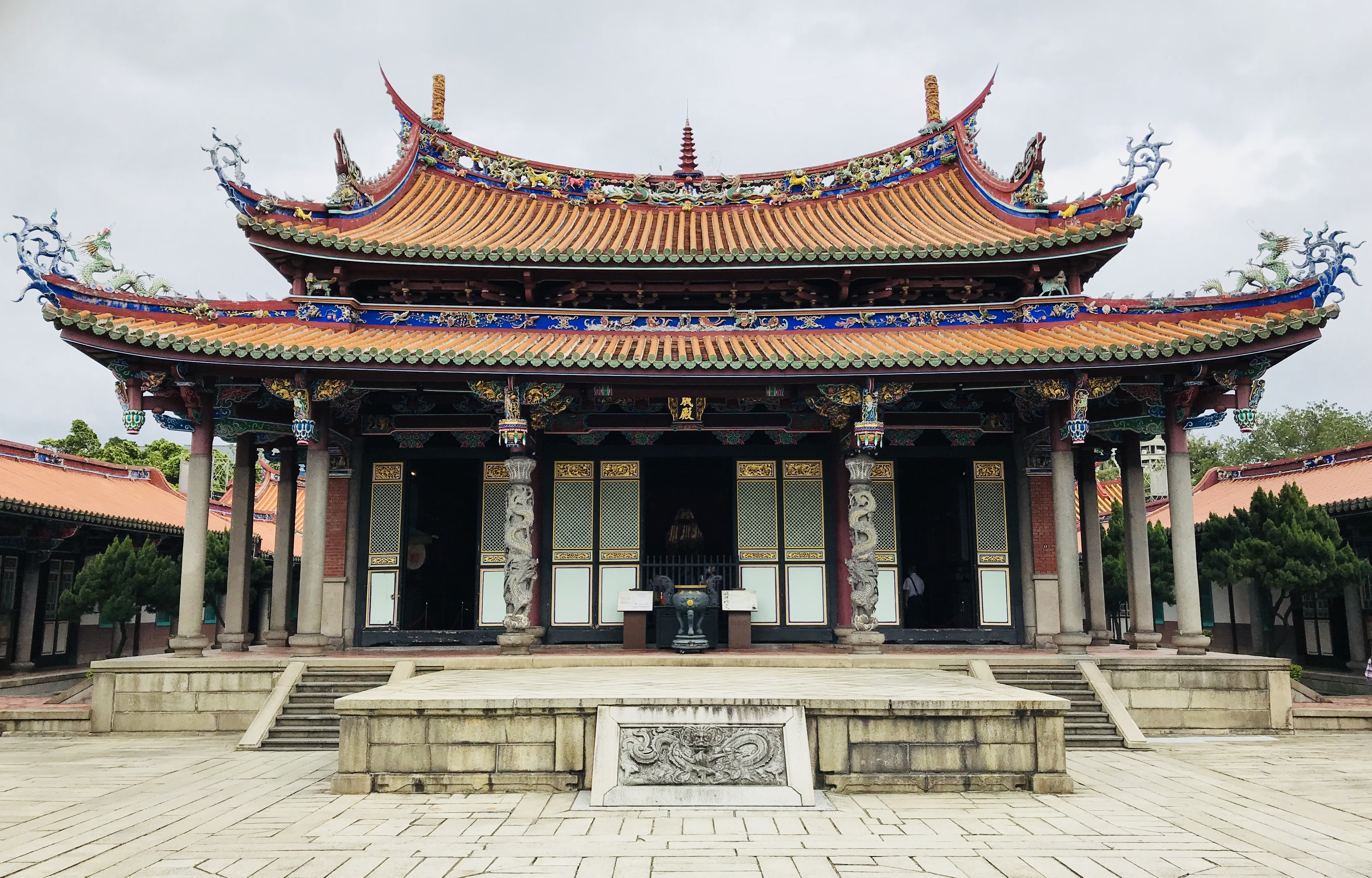

Location
- Location: Datong, Taipei, Taiwan
- Interactive map of Taipei Confucius Temple
- Coordinates: 25°4′22.57″N 121°30′59.8″E

Architecture
- Type: temple of Confucius
- Style: Fujian architecture
- Completed: 1879 (original building); 1930 (current building)

The Taipei Confucius Temple (traditional Chinese: 臺北孔子廟; simplified Chinese: 台北孔子庙; pinyin: Táiběi Kǒngzǐ Miào; Pe̍h-ōe-jī: Tâi-pak-khóng-chú-biō) is a Confucian temple in Datong District, Taipei, Taiwan.

== History ==
=== Qing Dynasty ===
The Taipei Confucius Temple was built in 1879 during the Qing era, after Taipeh Prefecture was established in 1875. The original site of the temple is the current location of Taipei First Girls’ High School.

=== Empire of Japan ===
Two years after 1895 Japanese invasion of Taiwan, a Japanese soul-summoning ceremony was held at the temple. In the later Japanese era, the temple was demolished, but was rebuilt in 1930 by Wang Yi-shun. The newly completed temple had only been in use for a few years when World War II broke out. The Japanese ordered an end to traditional Chinese ceremonies, and Japanese Shinto ritual music was played in the temple for a brief period until 1945 when Taiwan was handed over from Japan to the Republic of China.

=== Republic of China ===
After the handover of Taiwan from Japan to the Republic of China in 1945, the temple was temporarily used to house the Examination Yuan until 1951 when the office was moved to Muzha District. During the COVID-19 pandemic in 2020, visitors to the temple are required to maintain social distance and their numbers were regulated to ensure safety.

== Architecture ==
The temple is modeled after the original Confucius Temple in Qufu, Shandong. Among the Confucius temples in Taiwan, Taipei's is the only one decorated with southern Fujian-style ceramic ornaments.

== Events ==
Every year on September 28, a ceremony with traditional music and stylized dancing is held at the temple in honor of Confucius. The temple is also the place where students, accompanied by their parents, pay a visit before their college entrance exam to seek for blessing.

== Transportation ==
The temple is accessible within walking distance West from Yuanshan Station of the Taipei Metro.

== See also ==
- Temple of Confucius
- Dalongdong Baoan Temple, located nearby Confucius Temple.
- Bangka Lungshan Temple, Wanhua District
- Bangka Qingshui Temple, Wanhua District
- Xingtian Temple, Zhongshan District
- Ciyou Temple, Songshan District
- Guandu Temple, Beitou District
- List of temples in Taiwan
