= Dalongdong Baoan Temple =

Temple in Datong, Taipei, Taiwan

Coordinates: 25.073173°N 121.515562°E

- Chinese: 大龍峒保安宮
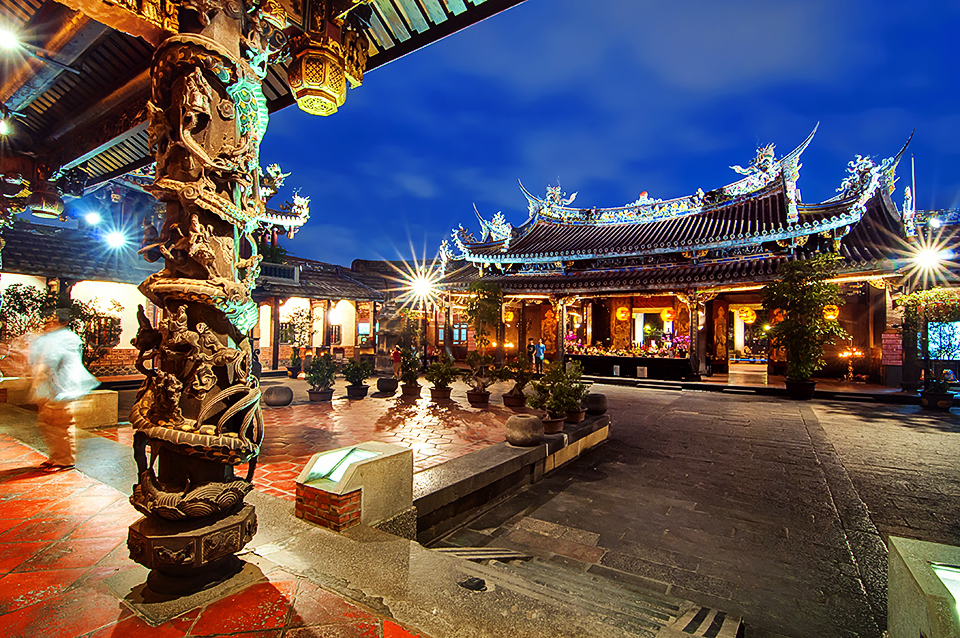

Religion
- Affiliation: Chinese folk religion

Location
- Location: Datong, Taipei, Taiwan
- Interactive map of Dalongdong Baoan Temple

Architecture
- Type: Temple
- Groundbreaking: 1804

Dalongdong Baoan Temple (Chinese: 大龍峒保安宮; pinyin: Dà lóng dòng bǎo'ān gōng; Pe̍h-ōe-jī: Tōa-lông-pōng Pó-an-kiong) also known as the Taipei Baoan Temple (臺北保安宮) is a Taiwanese Taoist temple built in the Datong District, Taipei, Taiwan. The present temple was originally built by clan members in Tong'an, Xiamen, Fujian, who immigrated to Taipei in the early 19th century and gave the temple the name Po-an (保安; Pó-an) in order to "protect those of Tong'an" (保佑同安). The Taipei Confucius Temple is located adjacent to the Baoan Temple.

== History ==
The temple construction commenced in 1804 and replaced a previously existing wooden shrine from 1742 in Toaliongtong (大隆同; Toā-liông-tông; modern-day Dalongdong). Throughout the 20th century during the Japanese period, the temple underwent numerous improvements and extensions, which resulted in the present temple grounds. In 1985, the Taiwan government conferred on the temple the status of level two historic monument and after years of neglect and abuse, in 1995 the temple was the focus of repairs and renovations. In 2003, the temple was inducted into the UNESCO Asia-Pacific Heritage Awards for Culture Heritage Conservation. Every year from mid-April to mid-June, the temple hosts the Baosheng Cultural Festival to commemorate the birthday of Poh Seng Tai Tay.

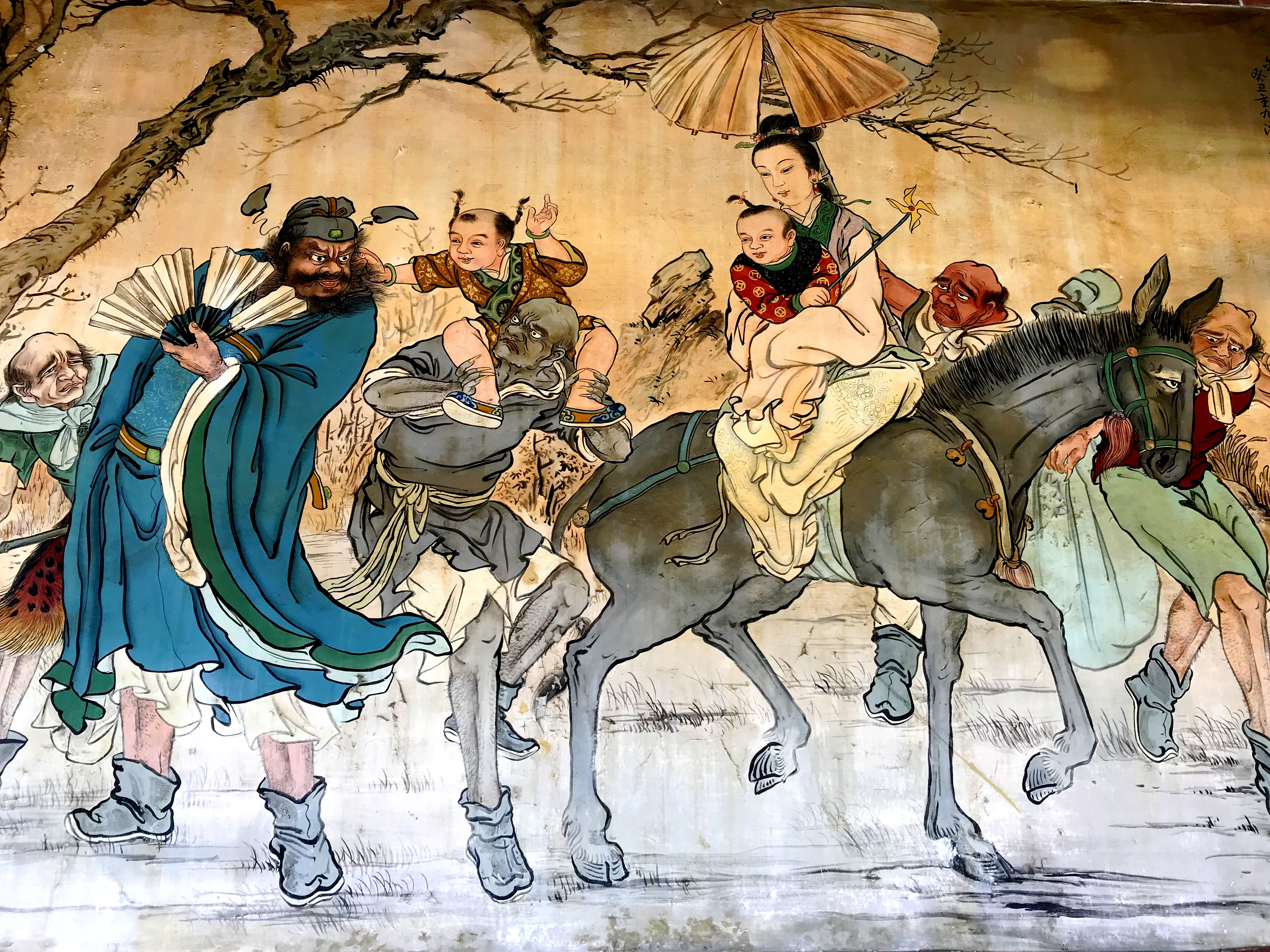
Mural

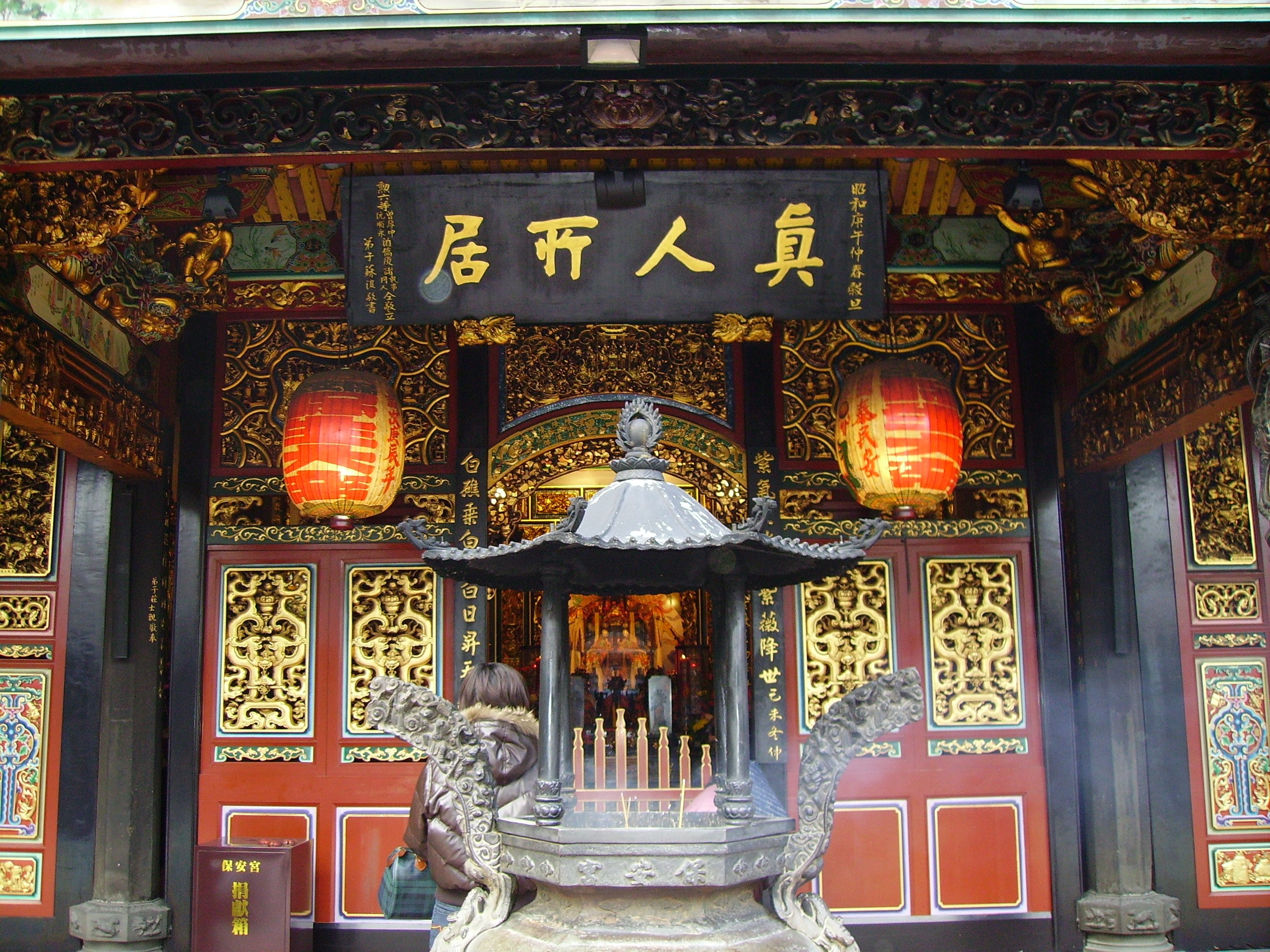
Shrine

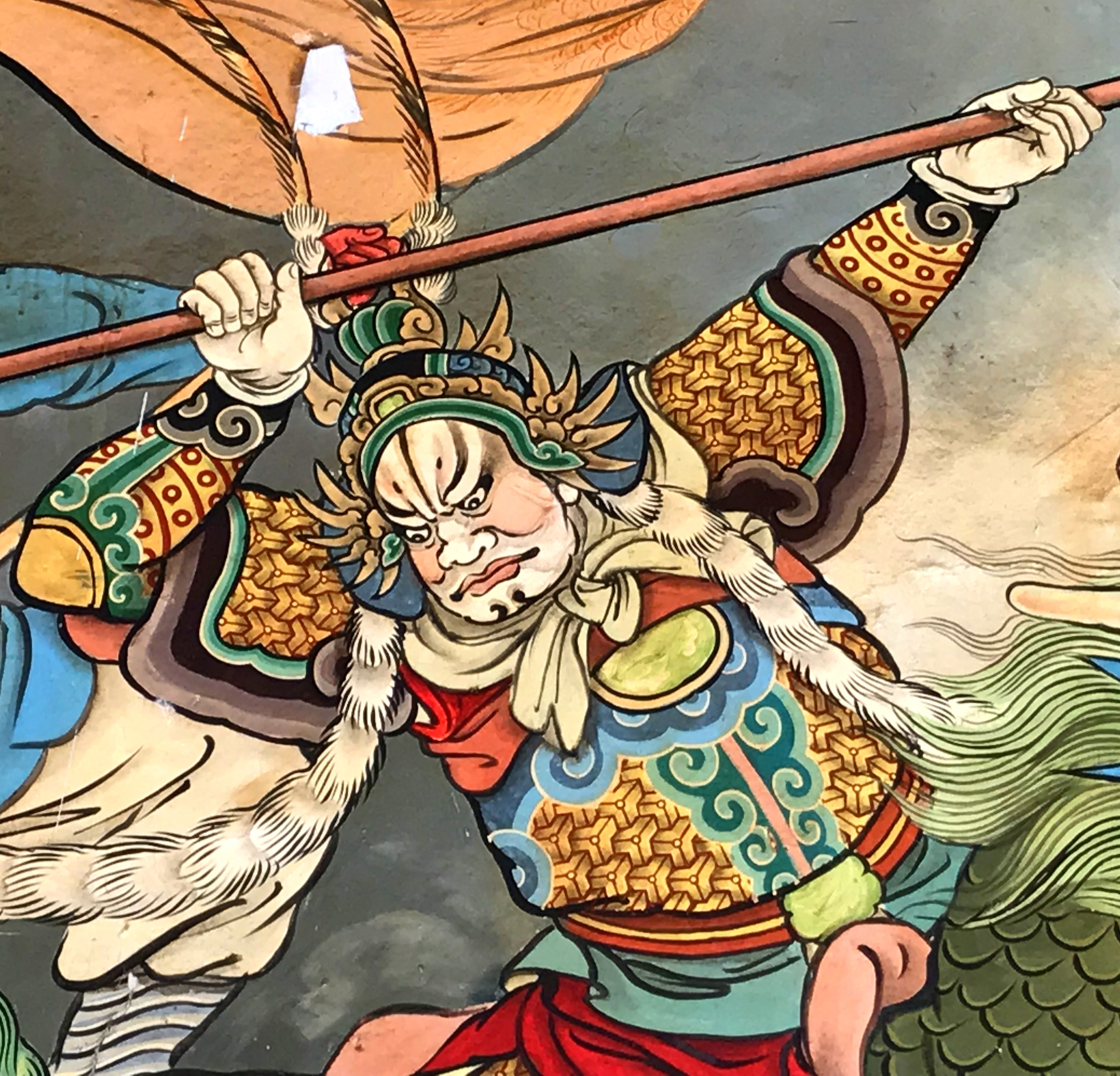
Mural

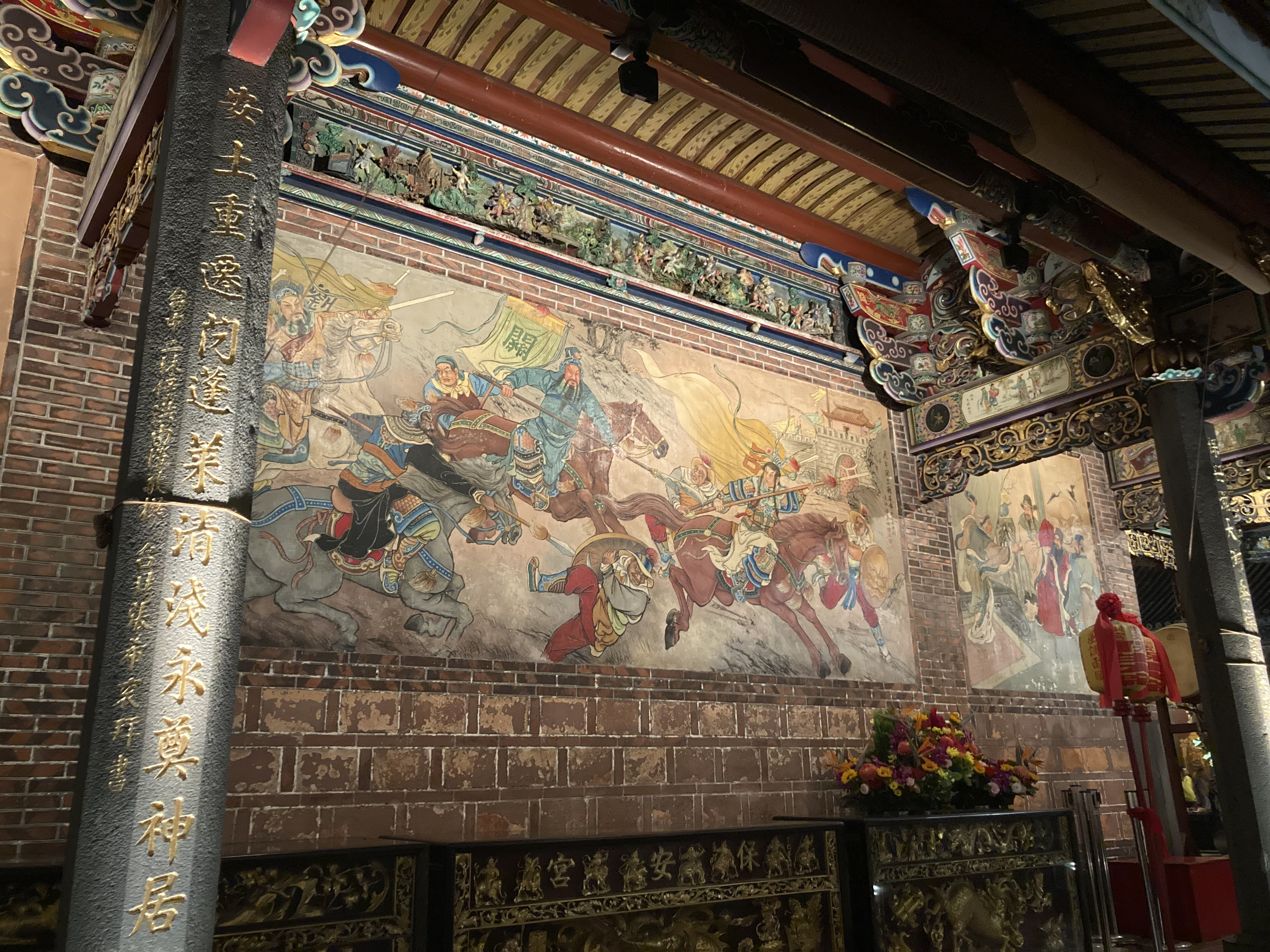
Mural

== Transportation ==
The temple is accessible within walking distance west of Yuanshan Station of Taipei Metro.

== See also ==
- Bangka Lungshan Temple
- Bangka Qingshui Temple
- Xingtian Temple
- Ciyou Temple
- Guandu Temple
- Taipei Confucius Temple, located nearby Baoan Temple.
