= Xingtian Temple =

Temple in Taipei, Taiwan

Hsing-tian Temple Hsing Tian Kong Xingtian Temple
- 行天宮
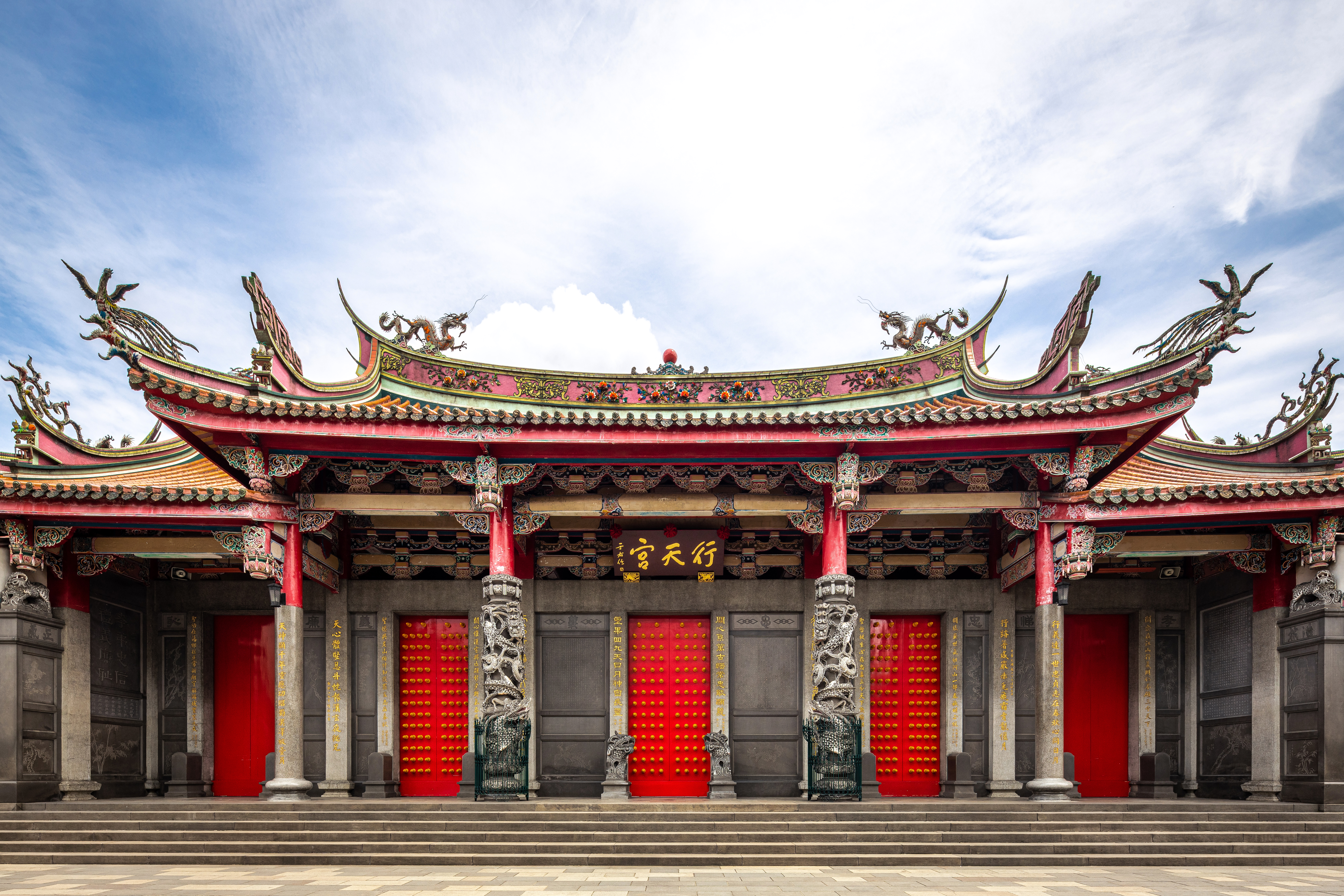
- Xingtian Temple in 2023

- Taiwan

Religion
- Affiliation: Taoism

Location
- Location: Zhongshan, Taipei, Taiwan
- Interactive map of Hsing-tian Temple; Hsing Tian Kong; Xingtian Temple
- Coordinates: 25.063073°N 121.533846°E

Architecture
- Type: Temple
- Completed: 1967

Website
- www.ht.org.tw

Various views of the temple in December, 2013

Hsing-tian Temple (traditional Chinese: 行天宮; simplified Chinese: 行天宫; pinyin: Xíngtiān Gōng; Wade–Giles: Hsing^{2}-t'ian^{1} Kong^{1}; Pe̍h-ōe-jī: Hêng-thian-kiong; also Xingtian Temple, Xingtian Gong or Hsing Tian Kong) is a popular temple in Zhongshan District, Taipei, Taiwan. This temple is devoted to Lord Guan, the Patron Deity of businessmen, military personnel and policeman. This temple is situated on a street corner near the center of the city. Sculptures of dragons feature prominently in this temple's design. It covers over 7,000 square meters.

== History ==
The temple was constructed in 1967. In 2014, in an effort to reduce particle air pollution, the temple became the first in Taiwan to ban the burning of incense.

== Transportation ==
The temple and its surrounding is served by Xingtian Temple Station of Taipei Metro.

== Gallery ==
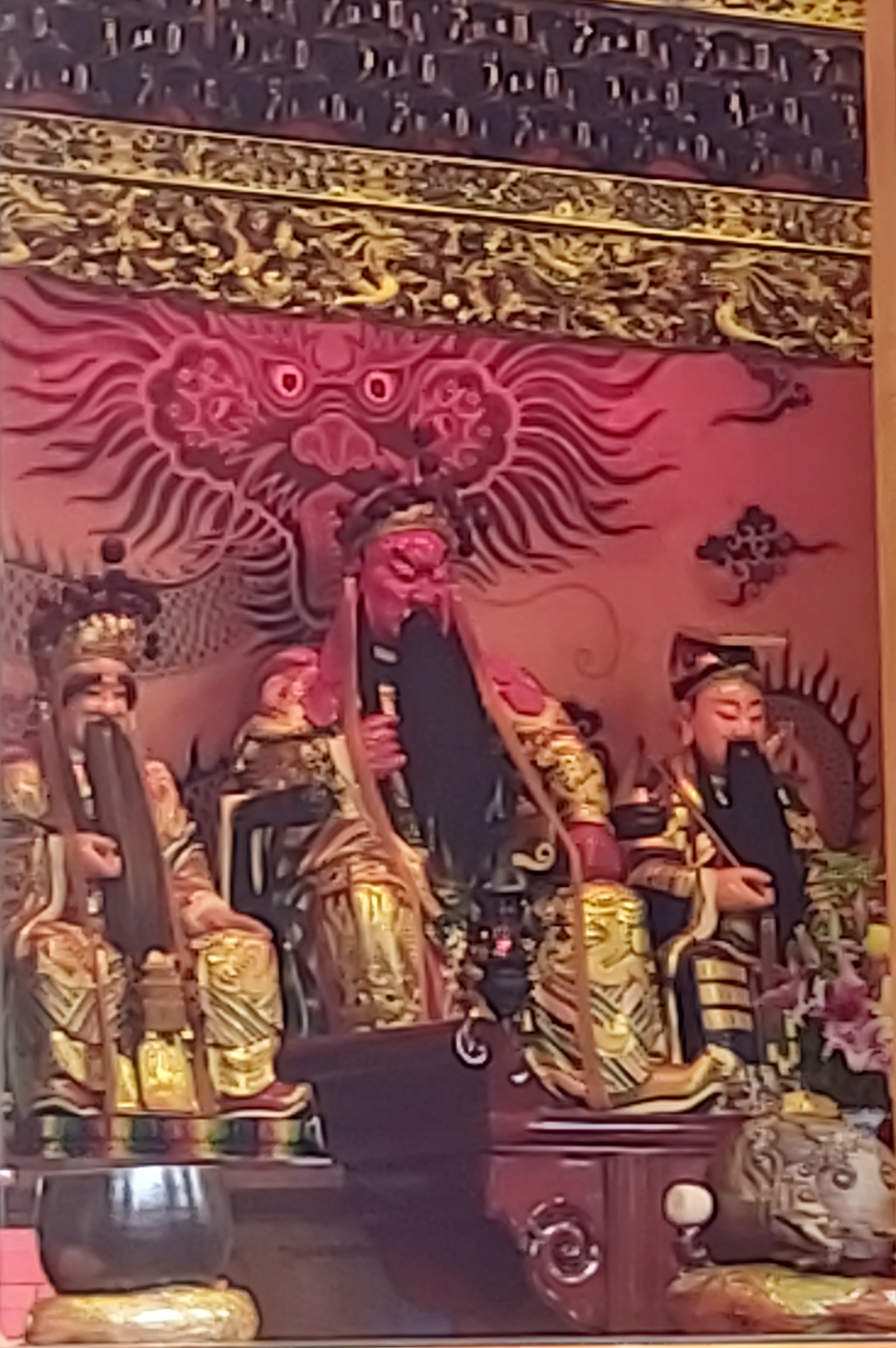
Statue of Enzhugong (Kitchen God, Guan Yu and Lü Dongbin) inside the temple

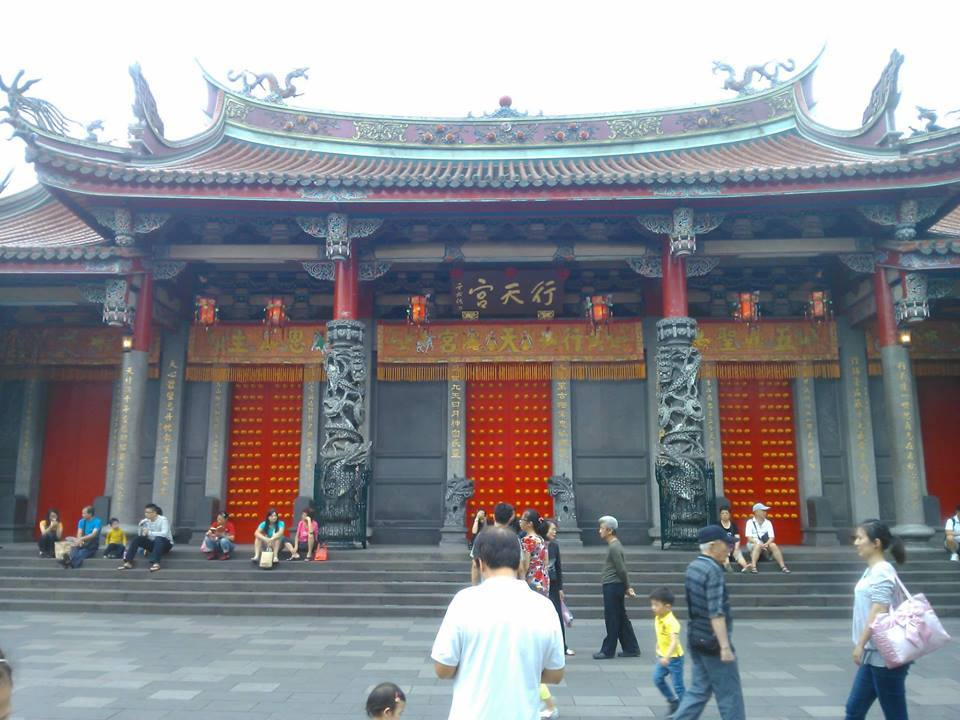
Front Gate

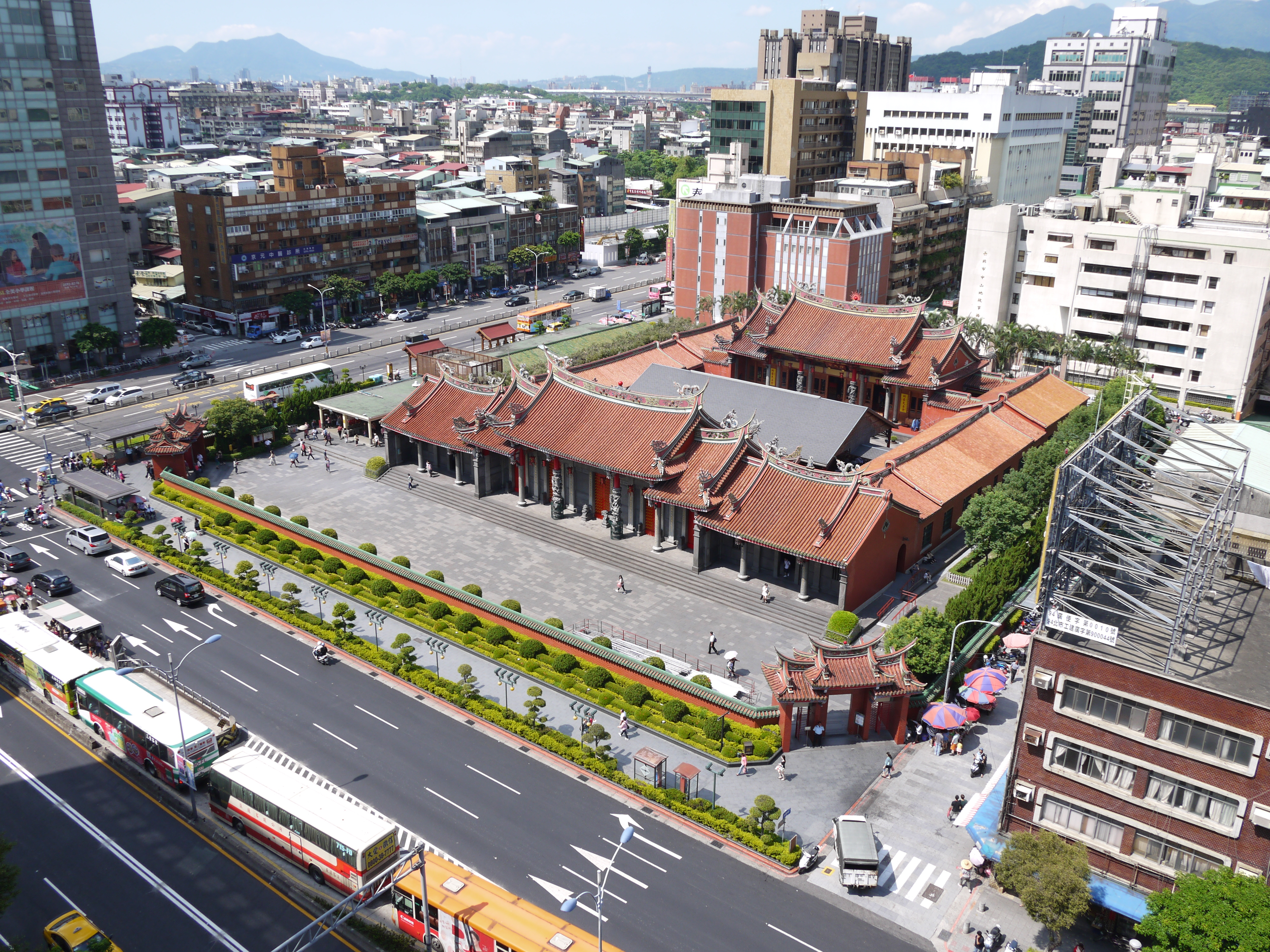
Birds' eye view of the temple

== See also ==
- Taoism & Three teachings
- Bangka Lungshan Temple, Wanhua District
- Bangka Qingshui Temple, Wanhua District
- Ciyou Temple, Songshan District
- Dalongdong Baoan Temple, Datong District
- Guandu Temple, Beitou District
- Zhinan Temple, Muzha District
- List of temples in Taiwan
