= Ciyou Temple =

Temple in Songshan, Taipei, Taiwan

- 松山慈祐宮
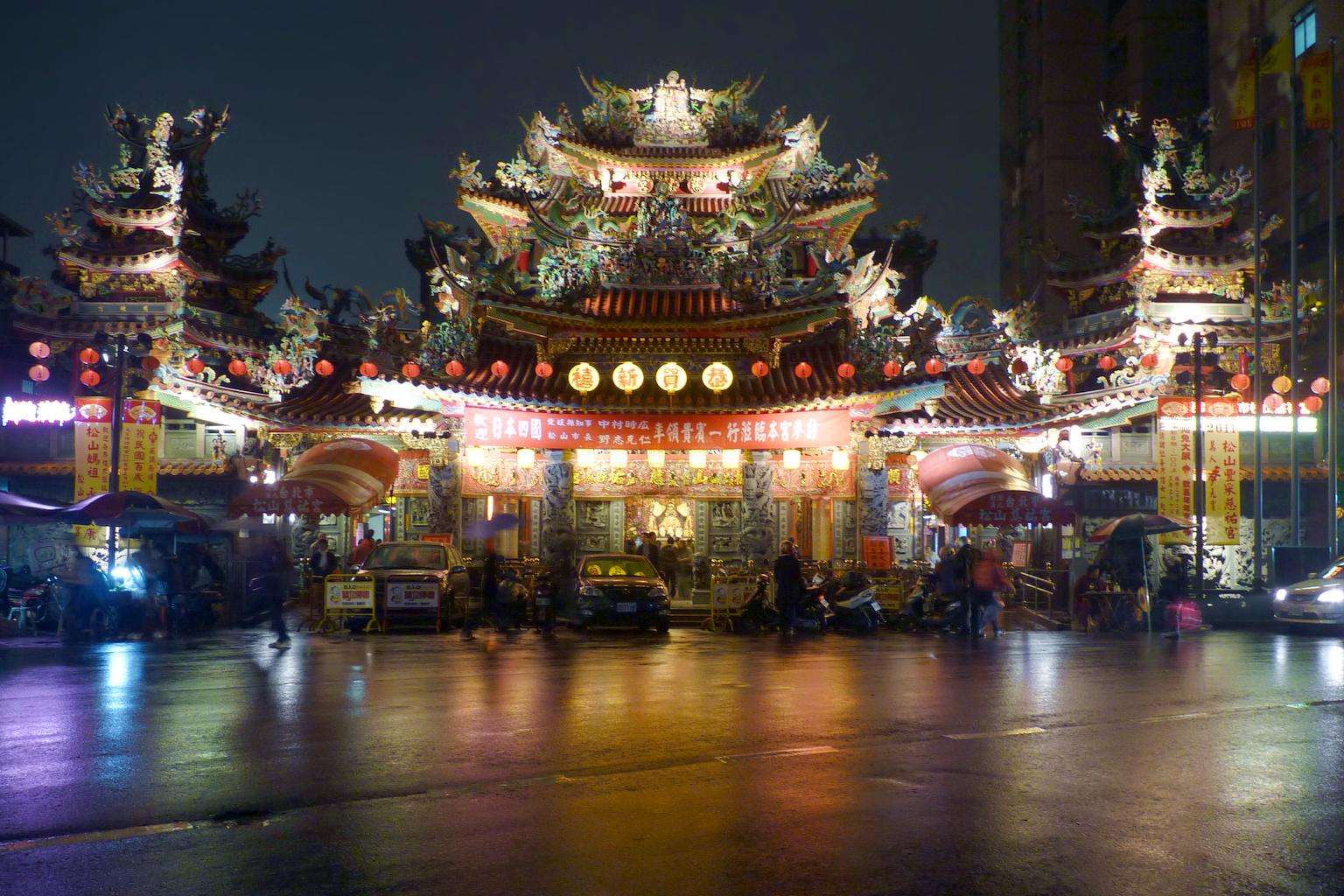

Religion
- Affiliation: Taoism

Location
- Location: Songshan, Taipei, Taiwan
- Interactive map of Ciyou Temple
- Coordinates: 25.051085°N 121.577678°E

Architecture
- Type: Temple
- Completed: 1757

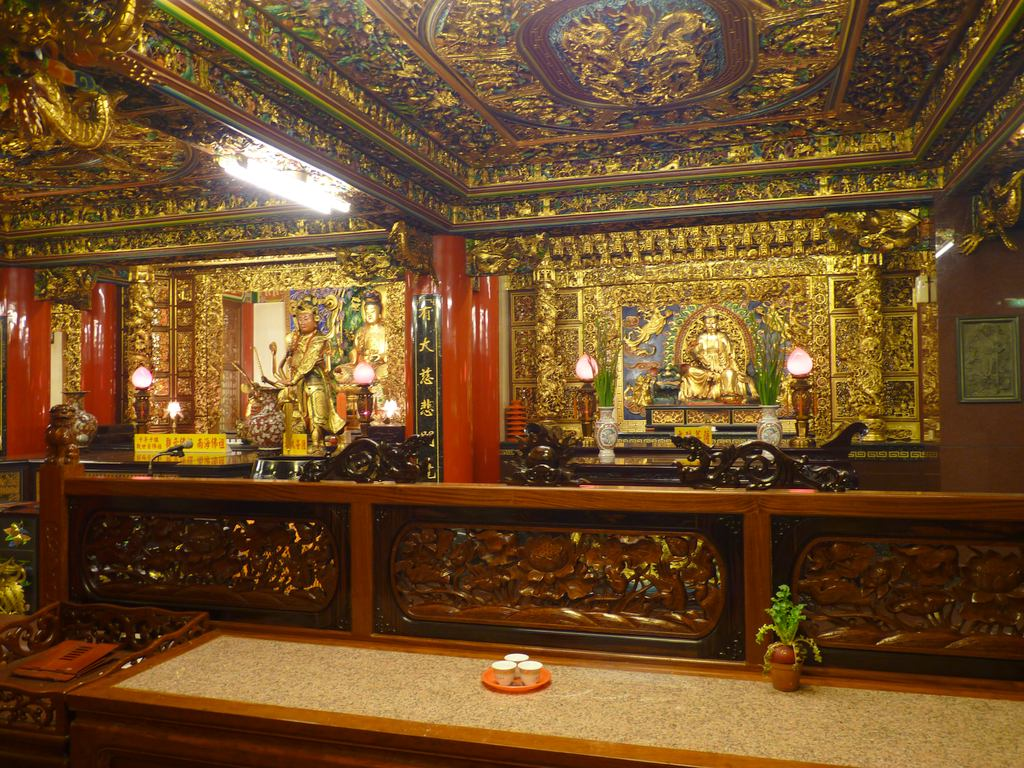
Altars in the tower of Ciyou Temple.

Ciyou Temple (Chinese: 松山慈祐宮; pinyin: Sōngshān Cíyòu Gōng) is a prominent Taiwanese folk temple in Songshan District, Taipei, Taiwan. The temple was built in the 18th century and is dedicated to the sea goddess Mazu. It plays a key role in local religious and community life. Each year, on Mazu's birthday (the 23rd day of the 3rd lunar month), believers visit the temple to pray and celebrate. Ceremonial offerings and an elaborate procession are held around this time, with believers carrying the statue of Mazu in a ritualistic palanquin on a parade that also includes well-decorated floats and battle-array troupes.

Ciyou Temple also houses a pantheon of Taoist and folk deities associated with different aspects of life, such as safety, fertility, education and prosperity, including the City God and the Earth God. Raohe Street Night Market was located next to this temple as the temple has become an iconic landmark in the area.

== History ==
According to legend, the temple was founded by a wandering monk who came upon a group of Mazu devotees. Together they raised money for ten years and then built the temple. Construction began in 1753 and was completed in 1757. The original main structure was destroyed by a fire in 1981 and rebuilt two years later.

The six-story temple is square and has an impressive main hall. Its roof ridge is adorned with figures made from cochin pottery, including phoenixes, figures from historical tales, and twin dragons facing three immortals representing wealth, happiness and longevity. The stone lions standing guard in front of the main hall were carved in 1803. The male lion is usually depicted with an open mouth and the female with her mouth closed.

== Transportation ==
The temple is within walking distance to the north of Songshan Station of the Taiwan Railway and the Taipei Metro.

== See also ==
- Qianliyan & Shunfeng'er
- List of Mazu temples around the world
- Guandu Temple, Beitou District
- Bangka Lungshan Temple, Wanhua District
- Bangka Qingshui Temple, Wanhua District
- Dalongdong Baoan Temple, Datong District
- Xingtian Temple, Zhongshan District
- List of temples in Taiwan
- List of tourist attractions in Taiwan
