= Dadaocheng Wharf =

Wharf in Datong, Taipei, Taiwan

Dadaocheng Wharf 大稻埕碼頭
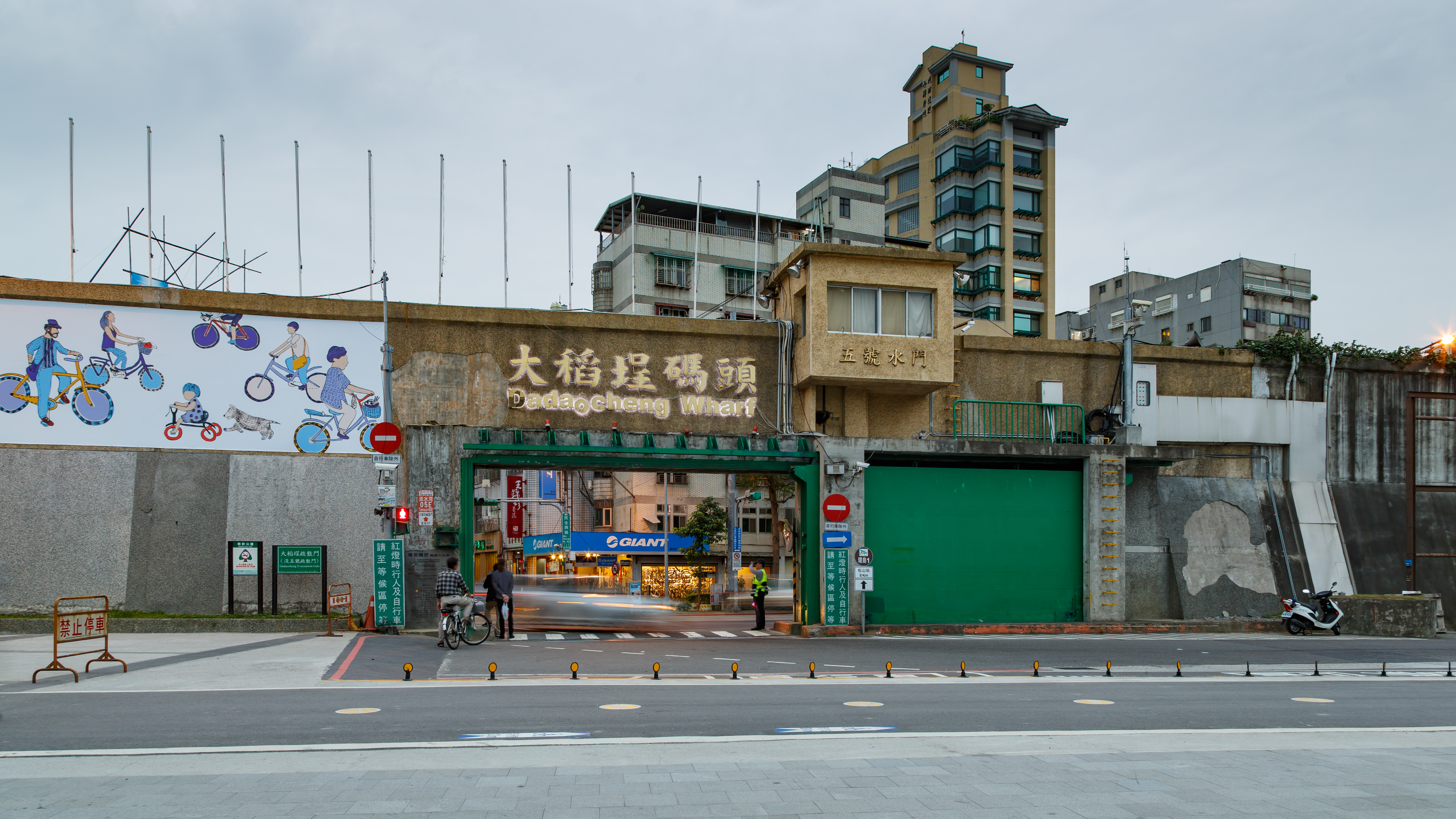
- Interactive map of Dadaocheng Wharf 大稻埕碼頭
- Location within Taiwan

Location
- Location: Datong, Taipei, Taiwan
- Coordinates: 25°3′23.4″N 121°30′26.9″E

Details
- Type of Harbor: wharf

The Dadaocheng Wharf (traditional Chinese: 大稻埕碼頭; simplified Chinese: 大稻埕码头; pinyin: Dàdàochéng Mǎtóu) is a wharf in Dadaocheng, Datong, Taipei, Taiwan.

== History ==
Located near the No. 5 Water Gate on the banks of the Tamsui River, Dadaocheng Wharf thrived in earlier years as an entrepot for trade along the river. Tea, cotton and silk textiles were among the main products bought and sold here, attracting trading companies from across the western world. During the Japanese rule of Taiwan, the activities around the area declined. In 2005, the Taipei City Government revived the area as a tourism destination, bicycling spot, and departure point for boat tours along the Tamsui River.

== Architecture ==
The area surrounding the wharf is equipped with bicycle paths along the Tamsui River.

== Destinations ==
Boats departing from the wharf head to Tamsui District in New Taipei during the weekends.

== Transportation ==
The wharf is accessible within walking distance north of Beimen Station of Taipei Metro.

== Opening Times ==
The wharf has boat departures daily on weekends. There is also a weekday service available for groups with an advance appointment, and for 10 or more individual passengers.

== See also ==
- Transportation in Taiwan
- Tourism in Taiwan
A panoramic view of Taipei riverside in July 2023
