= Longshan Temple (Taipei) =

Historic Taiwanese folk temple

Coordinates: 25°02′14″N 121°29′58″E

Bangka Lungshan Temple
- 艋舺龍山寺 (Chinese)
- Lungshan Temple of Manka; Mengjia Longshan Temple
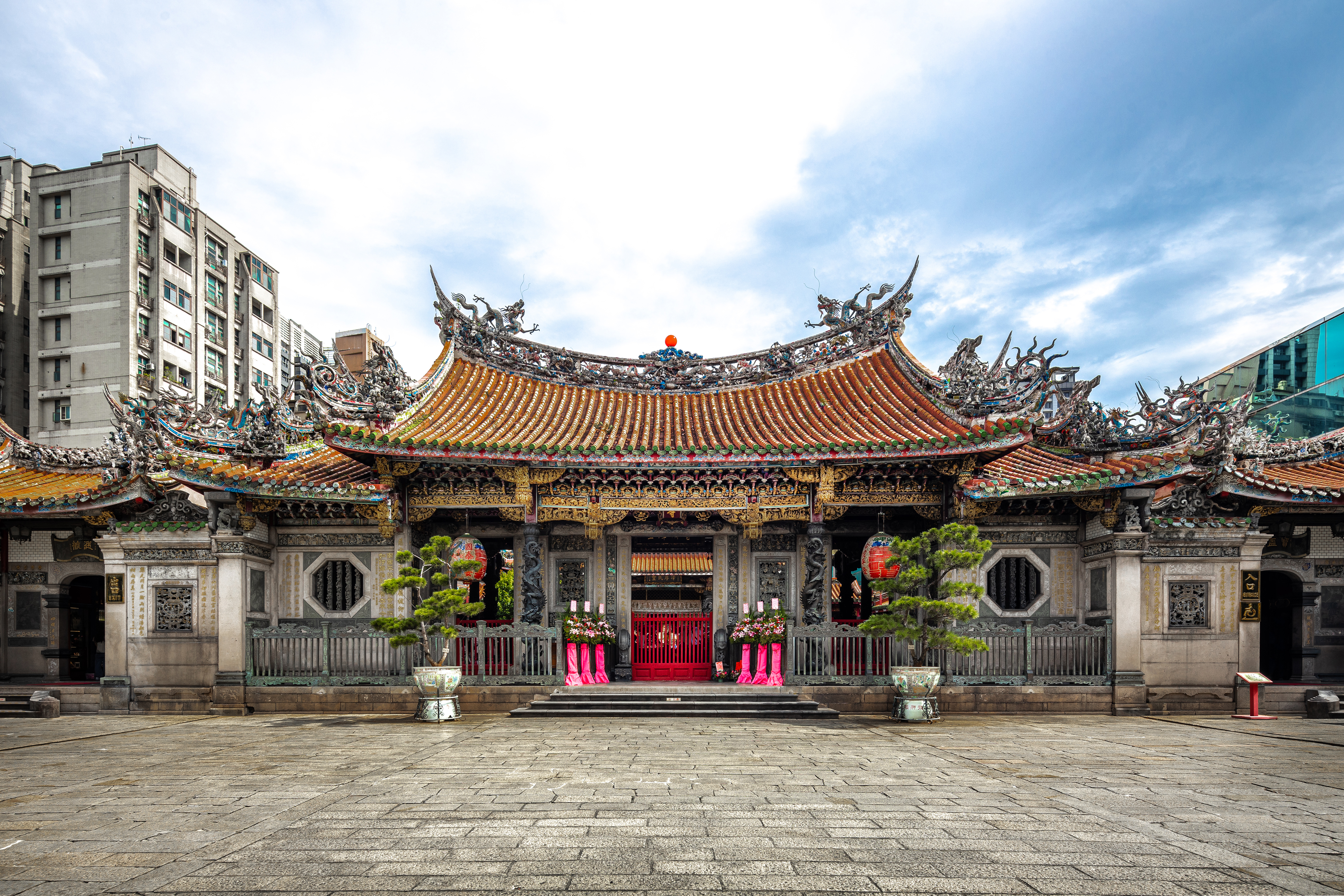
- view of the outer courtyard of Lungshan Temple in 2023
- Interactive map of Bangka Lungshan Temple
- Location: Wanhua, Taipei, Taiwan

History
- Built: 1738; 288 years ago
- Built for: Chinese folk religion; Chinese Buddhist, Taoist, and Confucian deities, including Guanyin, Mazu, and Guan Yu.
- Rebuilt: 1919–1924

Site notes
- Website: www.lungshan.org.tw

Longshan Temple
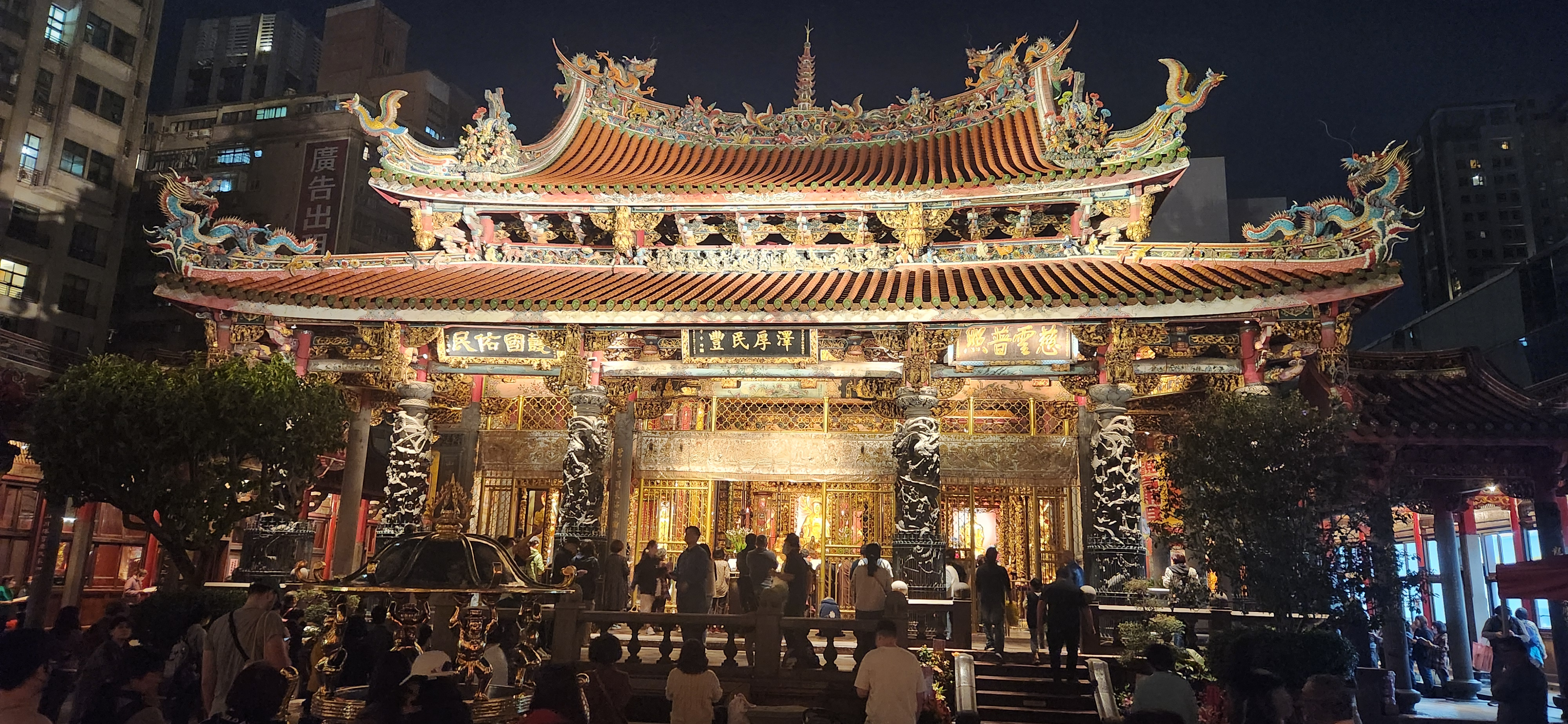
- Lungshan Temple at night
- Traditional Chinese: 艋舺龍山寺
- Simplified Chinese: 艋舺龙山寺
Transcriptions
Standard Mandarin
- Hanyu Pinyin: Měngjiǎ Lóngshānsī
Southern Min
- Hokkien POJ: Báng-kah Liông-san-sī

Bangka Lungshan Temple (also Lungshan Temple of Manka, Mengjia Longshan Temple) is a Taiwanese folk temple in Wanhua District (alternately known as Bangka/Mengjia), Taipei, Taiwan. The temple was built in Taipei in 1738 by settlers from Fujian during Qing rule in honor of Guanyin. It served as a place of worship and a gathering place for the Chinese settlers. In addition to its Chinese Buddhist elements, it includes halls and altars to Chinese folk deities such as Mazu and Guan Yu.

== History ==
This temple originated its name from the ancient Lungshan Temple established in Chin-chiang county of Fukien province in the seventh century. Immigrants from the three counties Chin-chiang, Nan-an and Hui-an of Fukien came to Manka in the beginning of the eighteenth century. As they were pious followers of that ancient Lungshan Temple in their home town, they erected this one as a branch temple at Manka and named it after the root temple when they created a new settlement here in Taipei. Lungshan Temple of today is no longer in the original buildings constructed in 1738. It was rebuilt in 1919 and completed in 1924.

The temple has been destroyed either in full or in part in numerous earthquakes and fires but Taipei residents have consistently rebuilt and renovated it. The temple was rebuilt during Japanese rule. Most recently, it was hit by American bombers during the Taihoku Air Raid on May 31, 1945, during World War II because the Japanese were reportedly hiding armaments there. The main building and the left corridor were damaged and many precious artifacts and artworks were lost. Among them is the Statue of Shakyamuni Emerging that was destroyed alongside a side hall. It was rebuilt after the end of World War II.

== Customs ==
Entrance to the temple ground is made from the Dragon Gate (Chinese: 龍門), and exit via the Tiger Gate (Chinese: 虎門). Upon passing over the gateway, it is an etiquette to not step over the threshold.

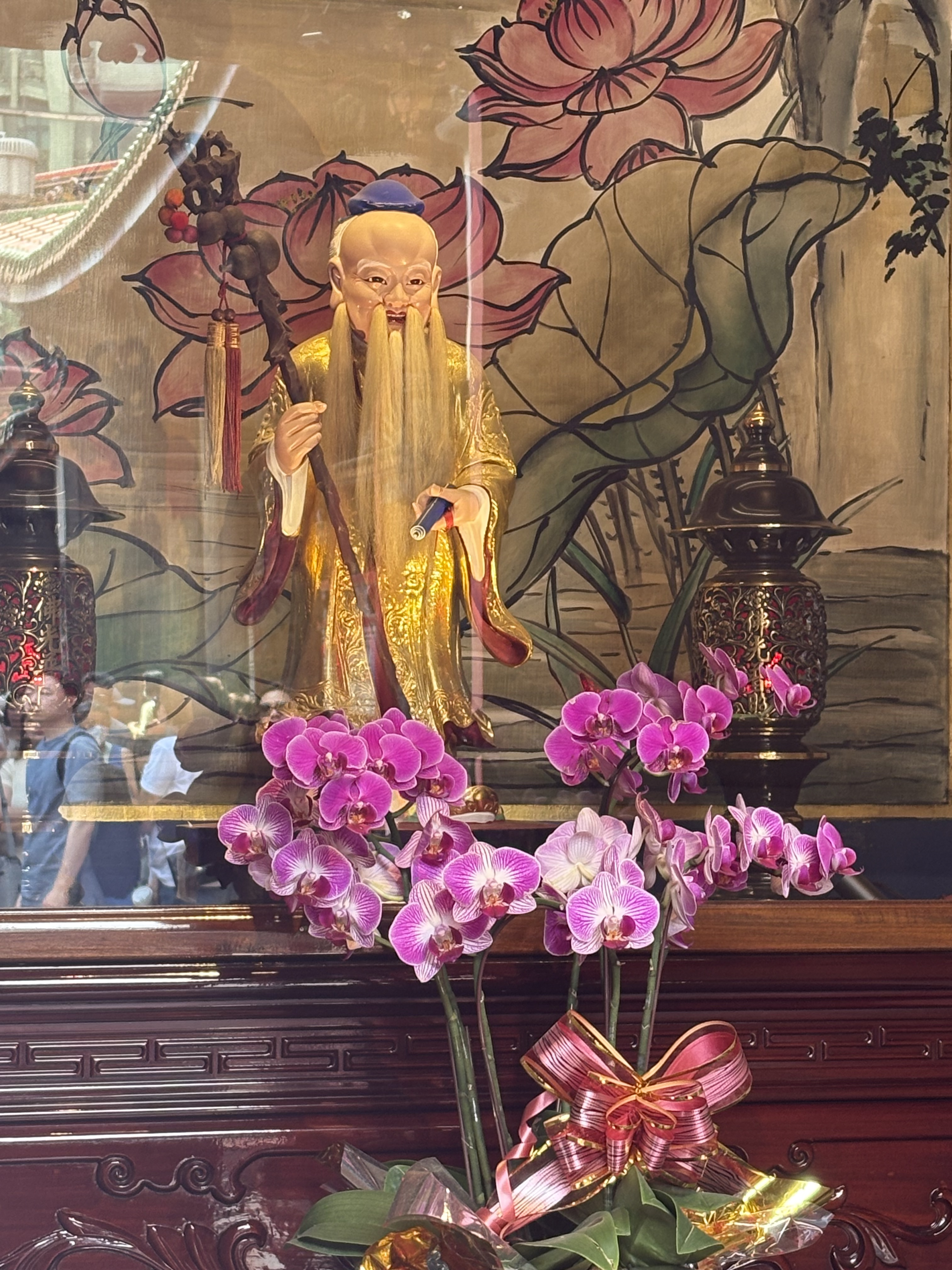
Shrine to Yue Lao in the Hall of Yue Lao

There is a specific order for spots of prayers to follow, according to the temple: The step begins at the front hall (Chinese: 三川殿; Sanguandian) where a prayer to three Buddhist Bodhisattavas (Avalokiteshvara, Manjushri, and Samantabhadra) in the main hall can be made and offerings placed. Then, the next spot is the main hall (Chinese: 正殿), where a prayer is made first to the central Guanyin statue. After that, turn around back to face to front hall and pray to the Jade Emperor in the sky. Upon finishing from the main hall area, one can visit the rear hall (Chinese: 後殿) and pray to a deity of choice who each are "specialised" in their specific fields. Among them is Yue Lao who is known for granting wishes related to romantic life and matchmaking. Specific rituals including jiaobei and red threads are described for praying to him. The praying ritual finishes at the rear hall.

In the rear hall section, there are five main structures, each dedicating to specific Chinese deities; from right to left, the Hall of Hua Tuo (Chinese: 華佗廳; deity of medicine and physicians), Temple of Emperor Wenchang (Chinese: 文昌帝君殿; deity of literature and taking exam), Temple of Tianshang Shengmu (Chinese: 天上聖母殿), Temple of Emperor Guan Di (Chinese: 關聖帝君殿) and Hall of Yue Lao (Chinese: 月老廳; deity of love).

During prayers to any given gods or deities; personal name, date of birth, and current place of residence must be mentioned following by the wish. After the prayer, jiaobei can be thrown for three times to ask three questions or affirmation.

Amulets are both sold or provided free of charge by the temple. Yue Lao's red threads are, for example, provided for free and shall be taken once the jiaobei throwing returns favourably three times. Any amulets of the temple are needed to be self-consecrated at the central incense pot in the central courtyard. The blessing of amulet is done by passing the amulet over the incense pot and move it in a clockwise circle three times.

The temple is popular among Thai tourists, especially for its altar to Yue Lao, who is believed to grant a lover for single people.

== Transportation ==
The temple is accessible within walking distance North from Longshan Temple Station of the Taipei Metro.

== Photo Gallery ==
Sanchuan Hall

Bell and Drum Tower and Sanchuan Hall

Hexagonal Bell and Drum towers

Entrance and molded copper pillar

Molded copper pillar with dragon patterns

Ccentral octagonal caisson in the Sanchuan Hall

Yuantong Hall

== See also ==
- Bangka Park
- Bangka Qingshui Temple, Wanhua District
- Dalongdong Baoan Temple, Datong District
- Xingtian Temple, Zhongshan District
- Ciyou Temple, Songshan District
- Guandu Temple, Beitou District
- Lukang Longshan Temple, Changhua County
- Fengshan Longshan Temple, Kaohsiung
- List of temples in Taiwan
