= Taiwanese folk beliefs =

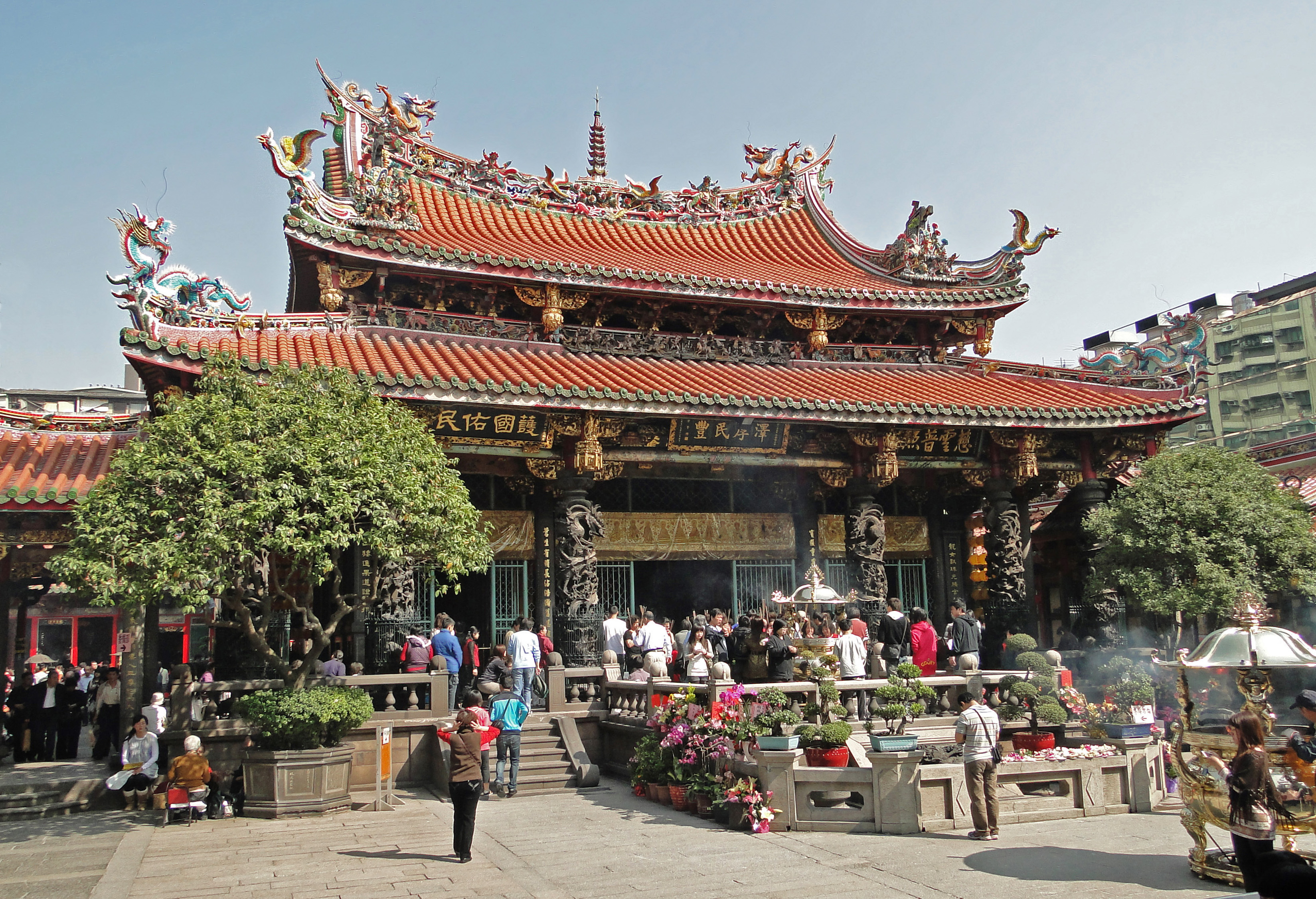
Taiwan's famous Confucianism, Buddhism, Taoism and Buddhism fusion temple Monga Lungshan Temple。

Taiwanese folk beliefs are traditional beliefs common across Taiwan, including Chinese folk beliefs that combine Taoism, Buddhism, and Confucianism. These also include the deification of local heroes and celebrities, Wang Ye worship, Taiwanese aboriginals, and the veneration of ancestors.

Ancestral spirituality crossed the Taiwan Strait with immigrants from the Minnan and Guangdong regions of South China, to take root in Taiwan. Overall, the original Chinese folk gods are still worshipped, but local beliefs have also emerged or been incorporated, such as worshipping the Japanese soldiers who sacrificed their lives to save the people; the worship of Yinyanggong and Wanshan Ye (萬善爺) in various places, and some temples are more bunrei in spirit, such as Nan Kunshen Dai Temple in Tainan. Some local beliefs retain their original characteristics, while some beliefs (such as Ali-zu beliefs) have been sinicized.

Taiwan is also the most religious region in the Chinese-speaking world, with 93% of people following a mixture of Buddhism, Confucianism, and Taoism, 4.5% Christianity, and 2.5% others.

Chinese folk religion in Taiwan is shaped by the Zhengyi Taoist clergy (sanju daoshi), independent orders of fashi (non-Taoist ritual masters), and tongji media. Taiwanese folk religion has characteristic features, such as Wang Ye worship.

== Gallery ==
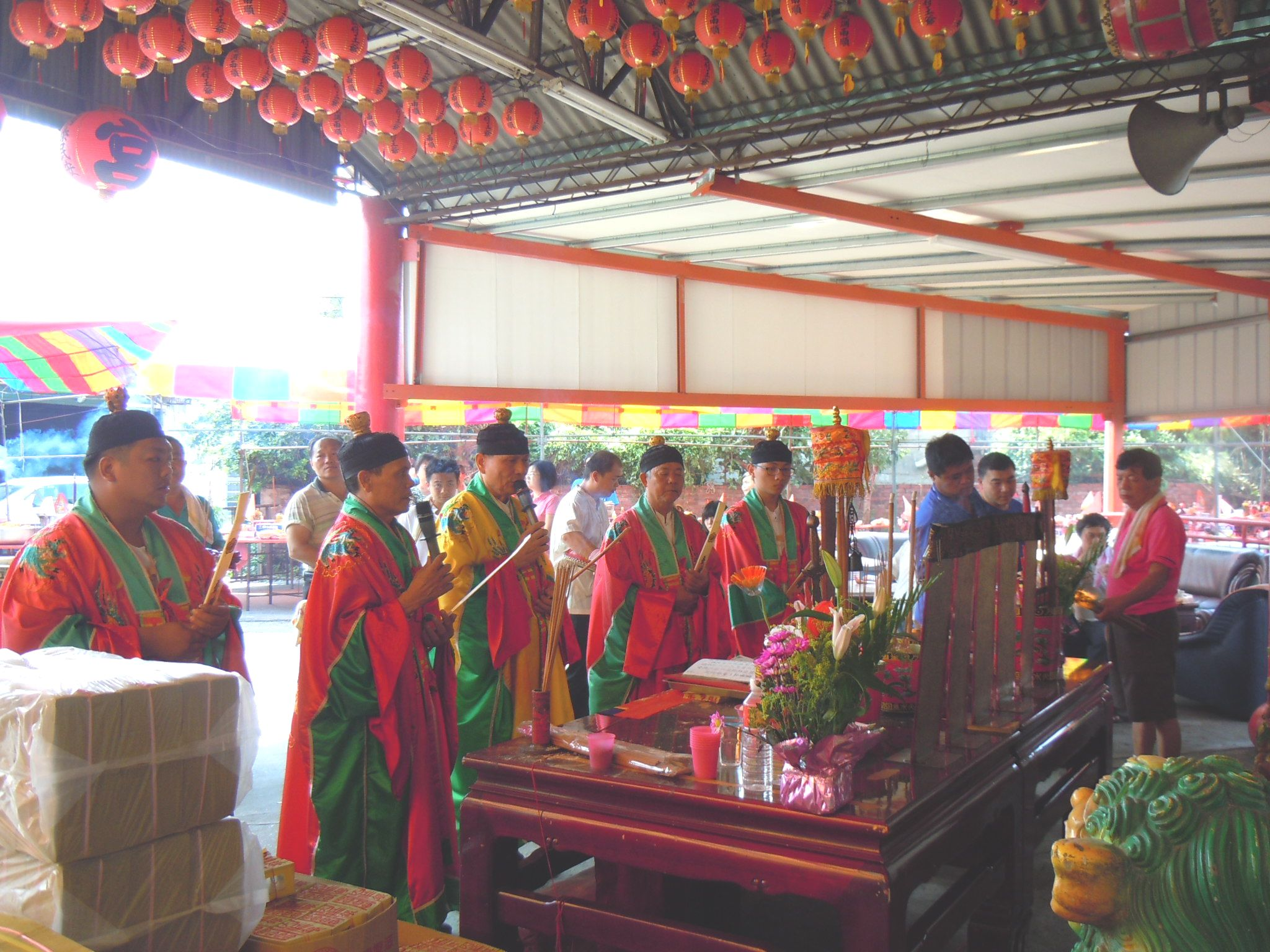
Folk Taoists officiating a ceremony in Taichung.

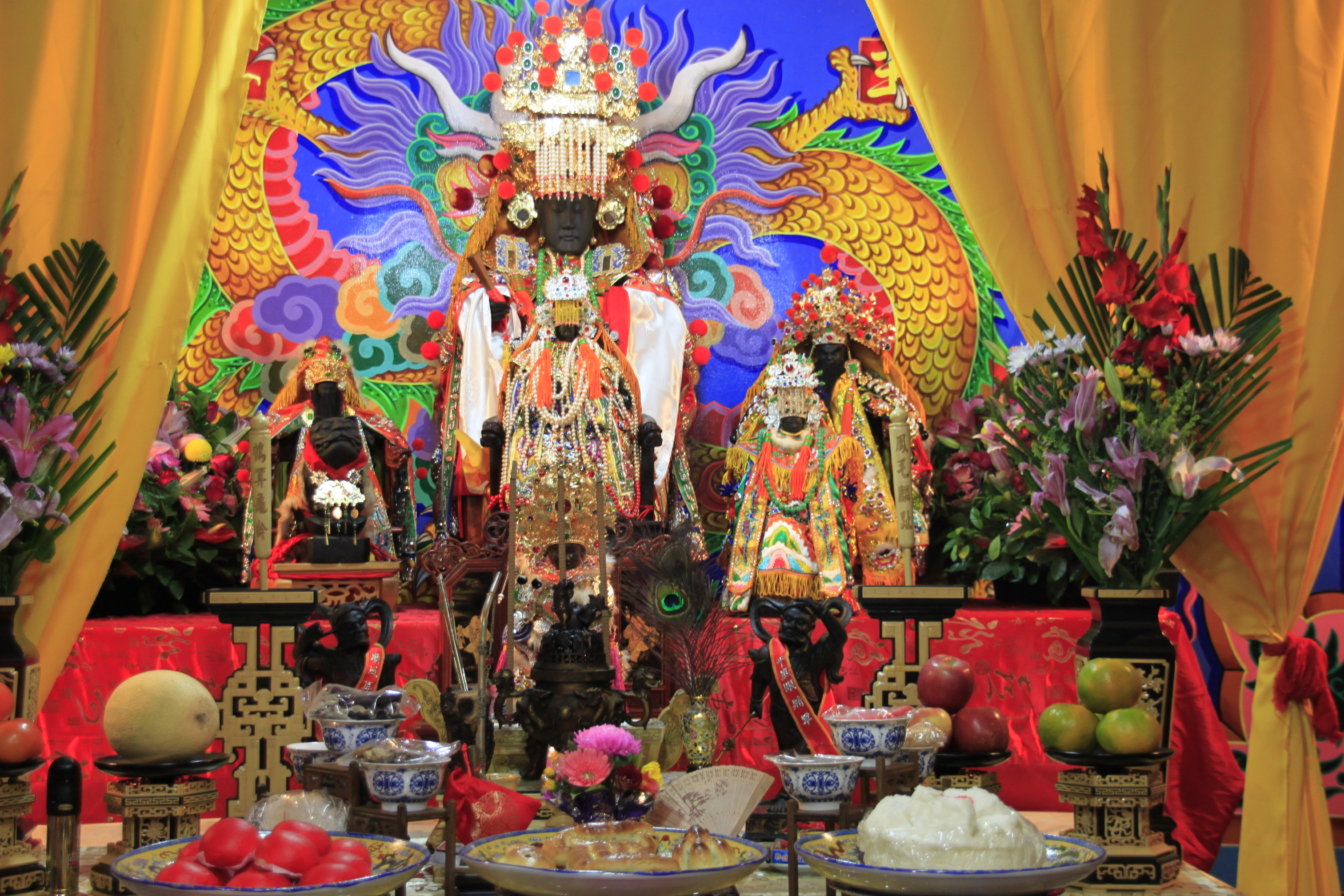
An altar dedicated to various gods at a temple in Tainan.

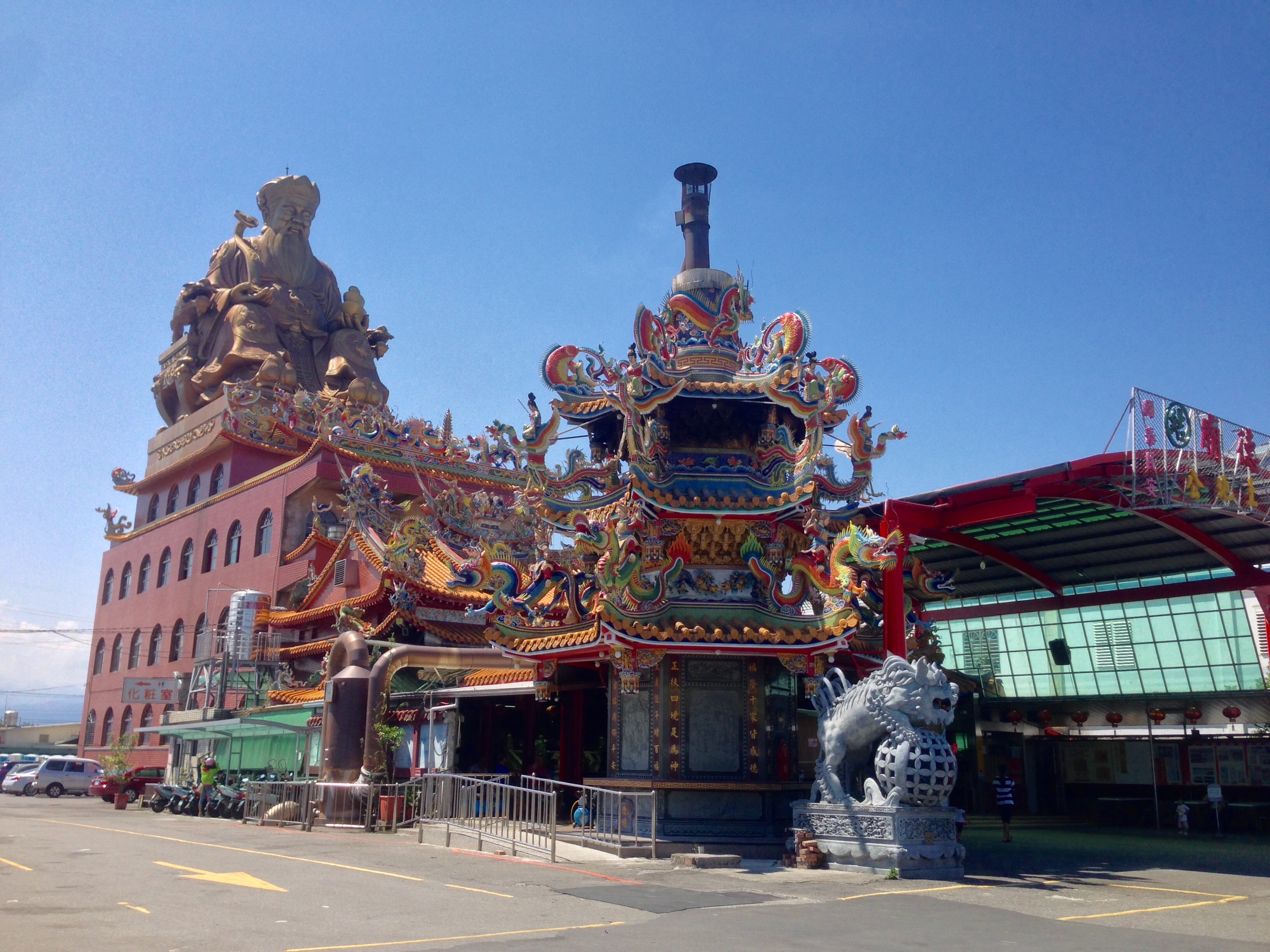
Temple of Fude in Wujie, Yilan.

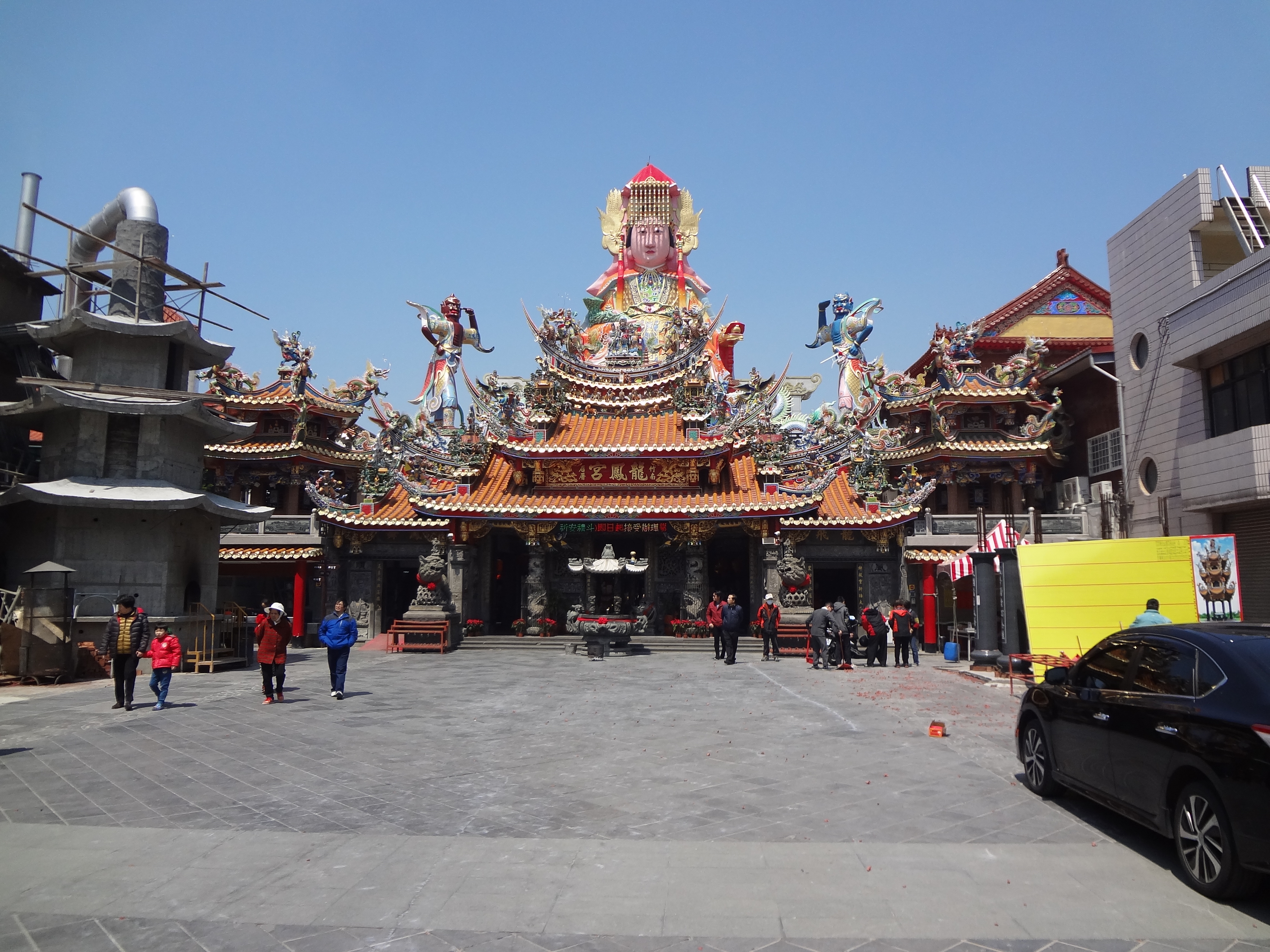
Hotsu Longfong Temple dedicated to Mazu in Miaoli.

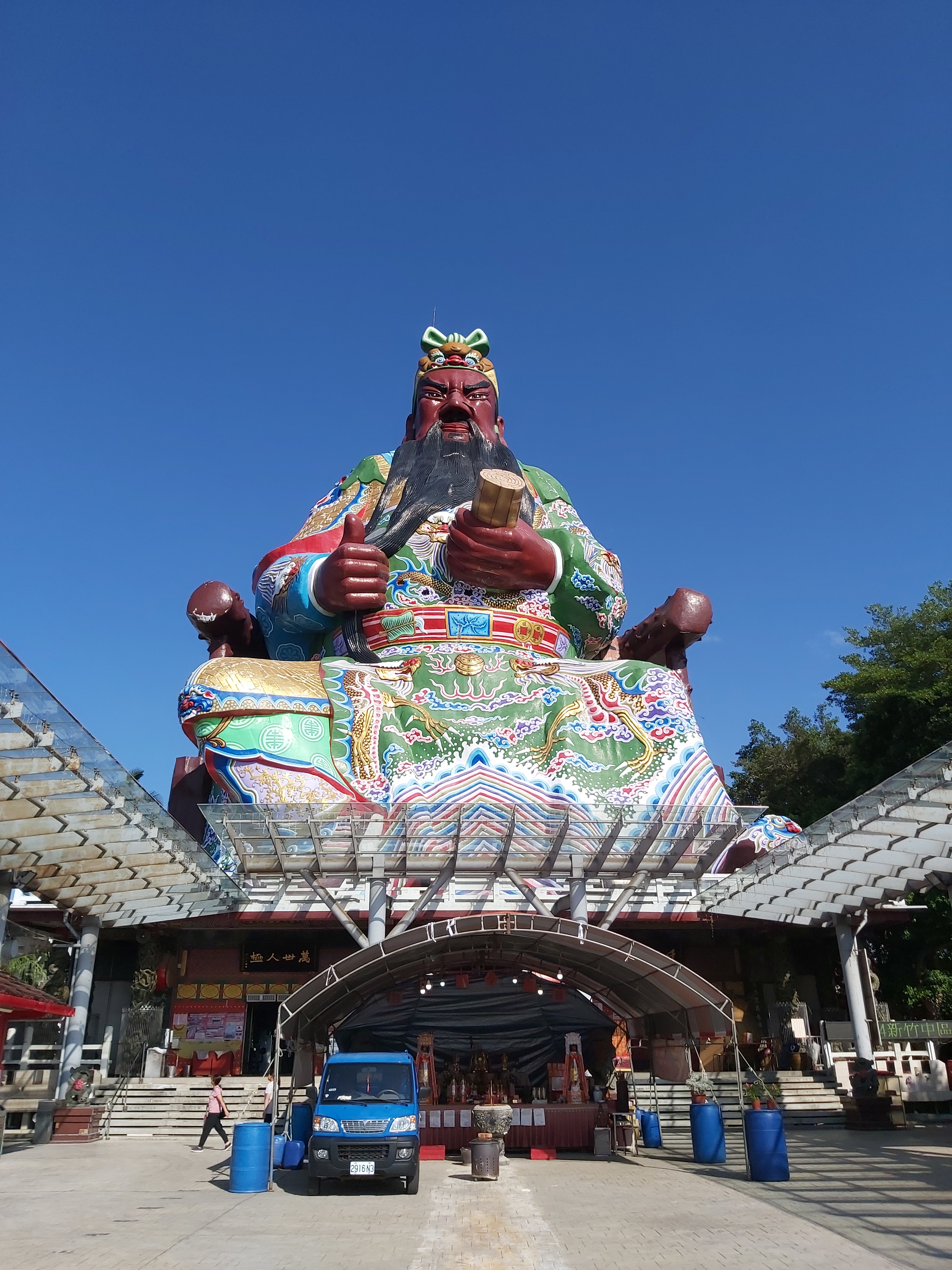
Temple of Guandi in Hsinchu.
