= Guandu Temple =

Chinese temple in Beitou District of Taipei, Taiwan

- 關渡宮
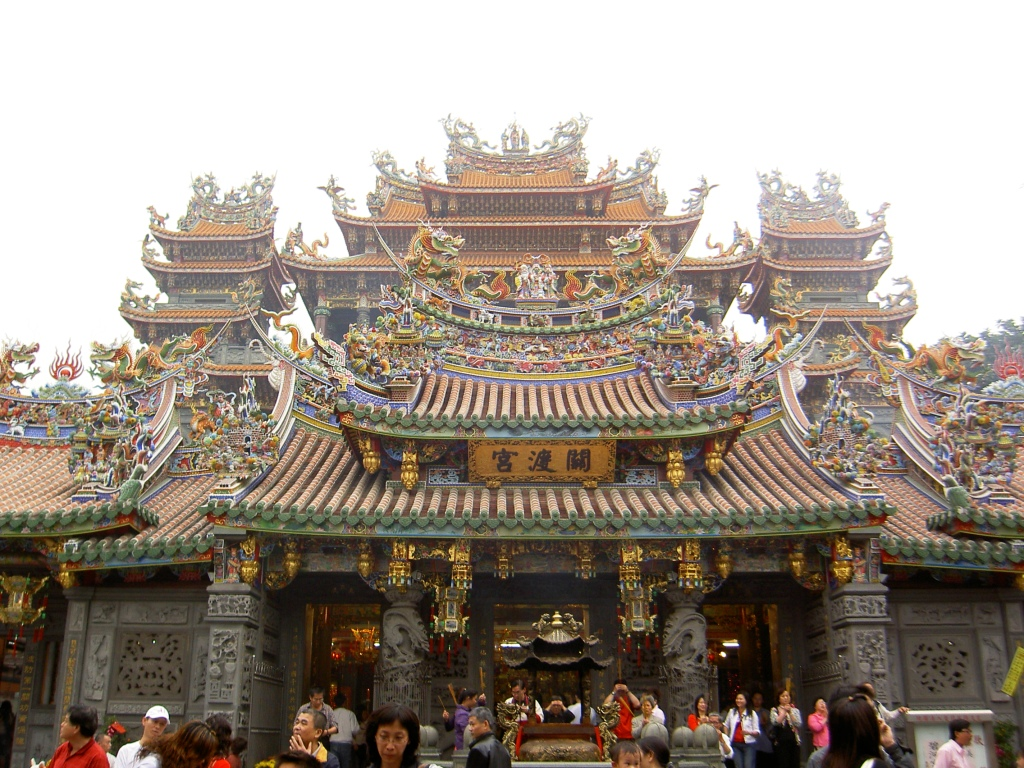

Religion
- Affiliation: Taoism
- Deity: Mazu

Location
- Location: Beitou, Taipei, Taiwan
- Interactive map of Guandu Temple
- Coordinates: 25°7′4.3″N 121°27′49.6″E

Architecture
- Type: Temple
- Completed: 1712

Map

The Guandu Temple (Chinese: 關渡宮; pinyin: Guāndù Gōng) is a prominent Chinese temple in Beitou District of Taipei, Taiwan, dedicated the Goddess Mazu.

== History ==
The temple was originally constructed in 1712. It was also known as Lingshan Temple due to its location at Mount Ling.

== Architecture ==
The temple is filled with carved dragon pillars, stone lions and wall sculptures. The door gods are in the form of relief carvings. The rafters and beams are also carved and painted. The image of Mazu sits on the main altar.

== Transportation ==
The temple is accessible within walking distance south of Guandu Station of Taipei Metro.

== See also ==
- Qianliyan & Shunfeng'er
- List of Mazu temples around the world
- Ciyou Temple, Songshan District
- Bangka Lungshan Temple, Wanhua District
- Bangka Qingshui Temple, Wanhua District
- Dalongdong Baoan Temple, Datong District
- Xingtian Temple, Zhongshan District
- List of temples in Taiwan
- List of tourist attractions in Taiwan
