= Bangka Qingshui Temple =

Temple in Wanhua, Taipei, Taiwan

Qingshui Temple
- 艋舺清水巖
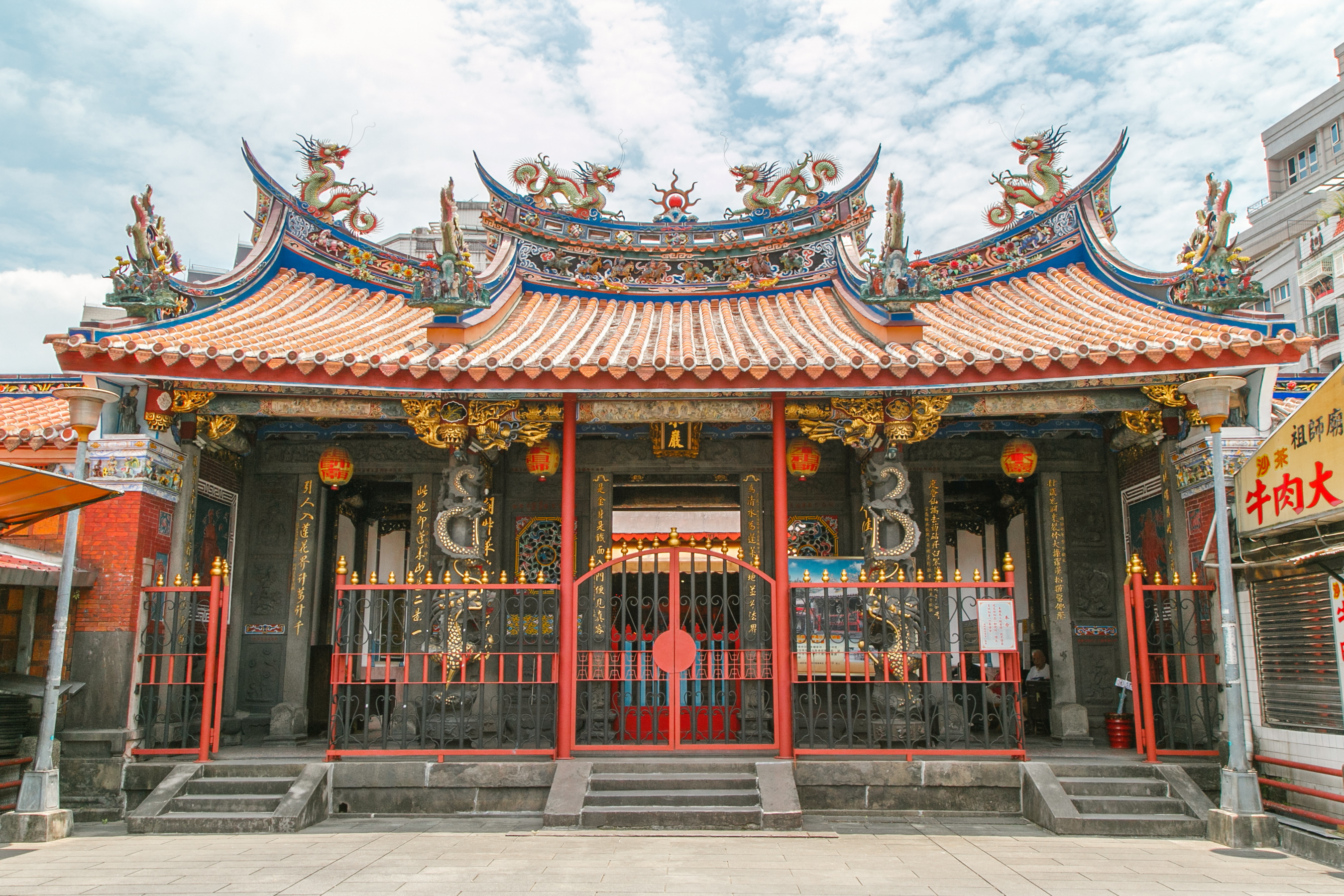

Religion
- Affiliation: Buddhism

Location
- Location: Wanhua, Taipei, Taiwan
- Interactive map of Qingshui Temple
- Coordinates: 25°02′25″N 121°30′10″E

Architecture
- Type: Temple
- Completed: 1787

The Qingshui Temple (Chinese: 艋舺清水巖; pinyin: Měngjiǎ Qīngshuǐ Yán; Pe̍h-ōe-jī: Báng-kah-chheng-chúi-giâm; Chingshui Temple) also known as Tsushih Temple or the "Divine Progenitors Temple" is a temple in dedicated to the Deity known as Master Qingshui, a Northern Song dynasty Buddhist monk who is said to have saved a town from a drought and performed numerous miracles. The temple is located in the Wanhua District of Taipei City, Taiwan. The temple is often called "the most characteristic example of mid-Qing temple architecture."

== History ==
The temple was constructed in 1787 CE. In 1958, the temple was renovated and restored.

== Transportation ==
The temple is accessible within walking distance west of Ximen Station of Taipei Metro.
