= Taipei Daojiang Ling An She =

Taipei Daojiang Ling An She, also known as Taipei Ling An She, was established in 1871. It is a longstanding beiguan “titzu hsuanshe” (amateur beiguan musical troupes) in the Taipei area. They own several ancient “shen chiang” (meaning holy guardians of the gods), human-sized costumes of deities that can be worn by people during parade formations and they are dedicated to promoting beiguan and “Chen Tou” (parade formation) culture. In 2015, it received the 19th Taipei Culture Award. In 2022, the shen chiang, including the Hsieh and Fan Generals, the literary and martial generals, the Xiahai City God, and the Xiqin Wangye preserved by the troupe were designated as general historical relics of Taipei City.

== History ==
Most members of the Taipei Daojiang Ling An She are local residents. In 1871, to participate in the worship activities of the Xiahai City God in Taipei Daojiang, merchants in the Dadaocheng area raised funds and commissioned artisans from Fuzhou and Fujian, China, to make the shen chiang of the Hsieh and Fan Generals, establishing the Ling An She. Taipei Ling An She is one of Taipei's five major troupes and the leading one among the eight troupes in Daojiang societies, participating in the night visits and patrols of the Xiahai City God Temple in Taipei's Dadaocheng.

Taipei Ling An She promotes beiguan and shen chiang parade formation culture through various means. It has records of beiguan opera during the period of Japanese rule and period after Japan’s’ surrender. It became the first troupe to perform beiguan opera on television when Taiwan Television started broadcasting. It also assisted in the filming of the 2014 movie Twa-Tiu-Tiann, introducing the culture of local parade formation to the public.

In past beiguan opera performances, female roles were played by male actors. However, in the 1970s, Ling An She started accepting female apprentices.

In 1986, Ling An She received the Ministry of Education's National Heritage Award in the category of traditional beiguan music. In 2015, it was awarded the 19th Taipei Culture Award.

Taipei Daojiang Ling An She possesses several old shen chiang and statues of gods. General Hsieh Pi-an and General Fan Wu-chiu are the longest-established shen chiang in northern Taiwan, usually enshrined in the Taipei Xiahai City God Temple. Additionally, the statue of Xiahai City God was brought to Taiwan by early settlers in 1821. Xiqin Wangye is the patriarch of the beiguan Fulu branch as well as the main statue of Ling An She, brought to Taiwan from Fujian during the Guangxu period. In 2011, Taipei Ling An She’s shen chiang parade formation was registered by the Taipei City Government as a folk cultural heritage. In 2022, the shen chiang of the “Hsieh and Fan Generals” and the “Literary and Martial Judges,” as well as the statues of “Xiahai City God” and the “Xiqin Wangye” were designated as general historical relics of Taipei City. In January 2023, Taipei Daojiang Ling An She was recognized by the Department of Cultural Affairs, Taipei City Government as the preserver of beiguan in Taipei’s traditional performance arts and is currently the only preserver in Taiwan that has shen chiang, beiguan, and historical relics.
