= Chen Ching-fen =

Taiwanese painter

Chen Ching-fen (Chinese: 陳清汾; April 21, 1910 - February 20, 1987) was a modern Taiwanese Western painter. He was born in Dadaocheng, Taipei. He was the fourth son of Chen Tian-lai, the tea merchant "Jinji Tea Company" owner during the Japanese colonial period. He was the first Taiwanese painter to study painting in France and one of the founders of the Taiyang Art Association.

== Life ==
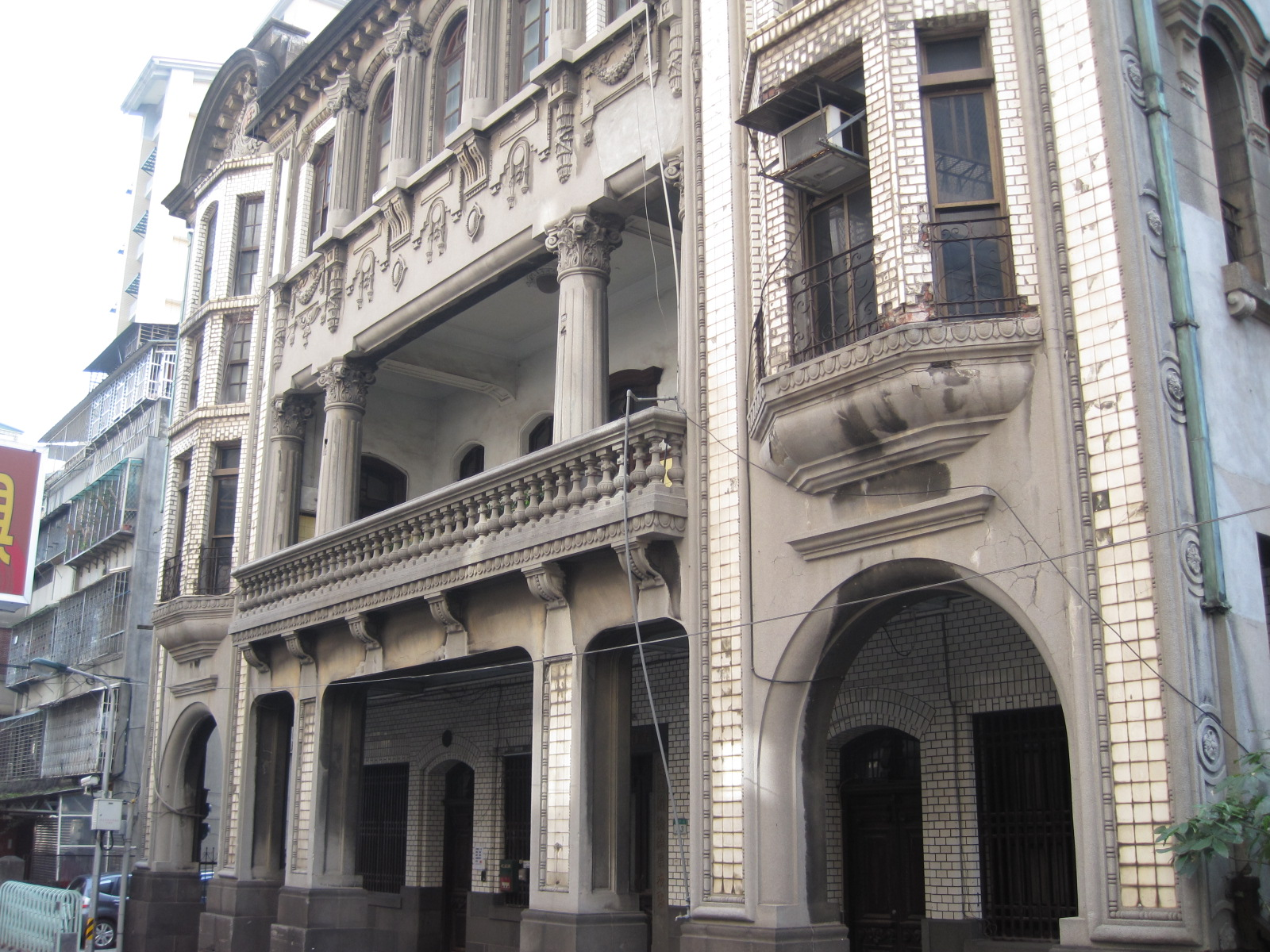
Chen Tian-lai Residence

Chen Ching-fen was born in Dadaocheng, Taipei, in 1910. His father, Chen Tian-lai, was a tea tycoon during the Japanese colonial period. In 1891, he founded the "Jinji Tea Company", which mainly sold Baozhong tea and oolong tea to Southeast Asia, Indonesia, Manchuria, and other places. In 1923, he invested in Taipei Penglai Pavilion Restaurant.

In May 1939, he married Tanaka Fujiko through the matchmaker of his mentor, Ikuma Arishima, and changed his name to Tanaka Ching-fen. He also had another wife, Wang Shuyi, the niece of Wang Xiangchan.

== Award-winning artworks ==
The following is a list of Chen's award-winning artworks:

- In 1927, Japan Art School Gold Prize.
- In 1928, Arch de Triomphe and Willows by the River were selected for the Second Science Association.
- In 1928, Sad Village was selected for the Paris Salon Art Exhibition.
- In 1929, A Corner of the Park was selected for the 16th Second Science Exhibition.
- In 1930, Light of the Spring Dynasty was selected for the 17th Second Science Exhibition.
- In 1931, two works, including "Barry Roof", were selected for the 18th Second Science Exhibition.
- In 1933, Still Life with Vegetables and Rooftops in Paris were selected for the Seventh Taiwan Exhibition, and Tea Garden was selected for the Seventh Taiwan Exhibition "Taiwan Exhibition Reward".
- In 1934, Landscape without Sky was a special selection of the eighth Taiwan Exhibition "Asahi Reward".
- In 1935, Lin Benyuan Garden was selected for the ninth Taiwan Exhibition.
- In 1936, Portrait of a Certain Woman and Shepherd Boy Returning to the Village were recommended for the tenth Taiwan Exhibition.
- In 1938, the first exhibition of Kyudanban Scenery was not inspected.
- In 1939, Karuizawa Pond was specially selected for the second exhibition as "Recommend".
- In 1940, Green Shade was selected for the Third Huifu Exhibition.
- In 1941, Good Day in Beijing was selected for the Fourth Beijing Exhibition.
- In 1942, China Women was recommended for the Fifth Exhibition.
- In 1943, Dawn in Shanghai was recommended for the Sixth Home Exhibition.
