= Customs Administration =

Customs Administration may refer to:

- General Administration of Customs (中华人民共和国海关总署), headquartered in Beijing
- Customs Administration, Ministry of Finance (財政部關務署), headquartered in Taipei
