= Taiwan New Cultural Movement Memorial Hall =

Memorial hall in Datong, Taipei, Taiwan

- 臺灣新文化運動紀念館
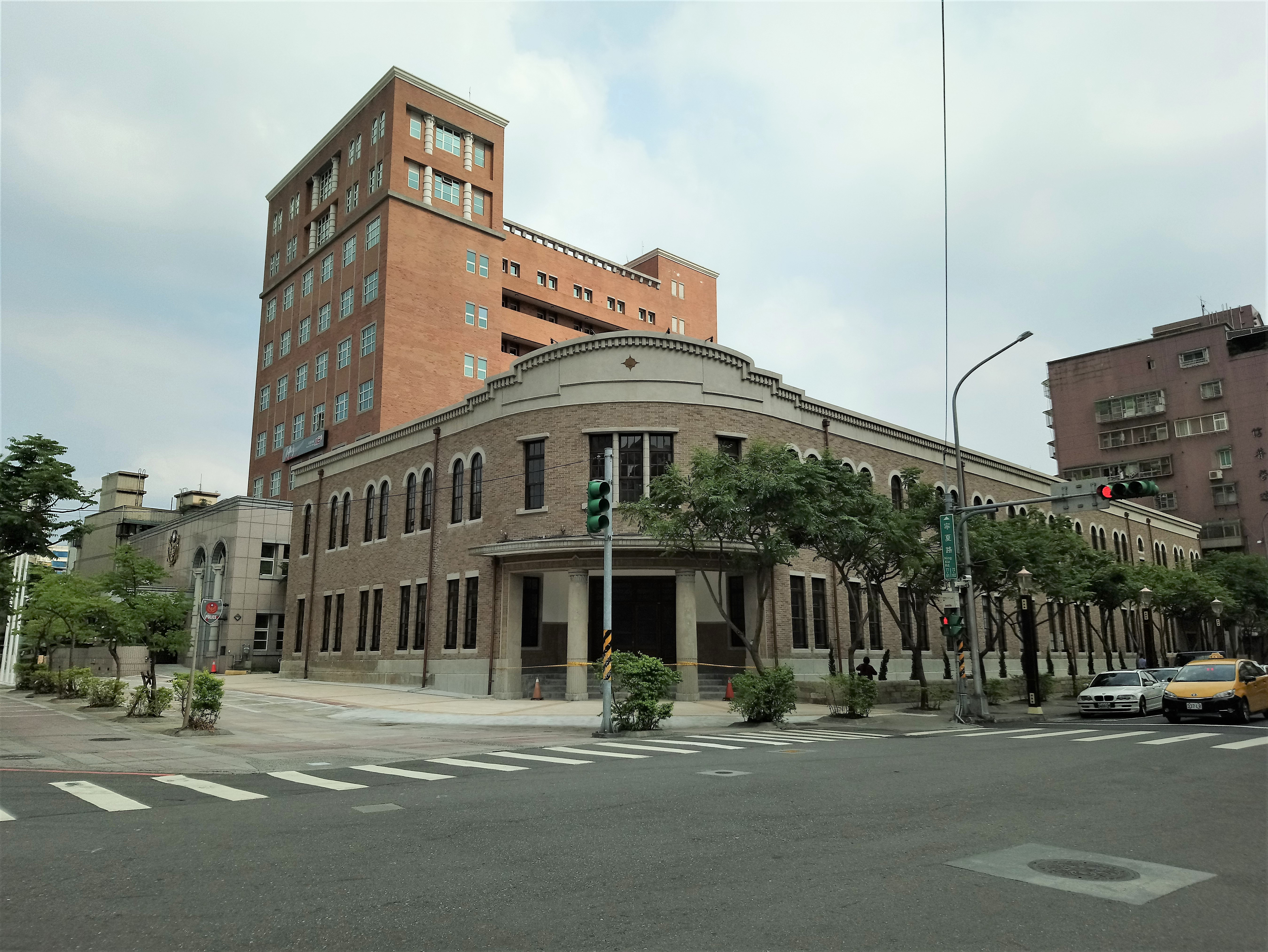
- Interactive map of the Taiwan New Cultural Movement Memorial Hall area

General information
- Location: Datong, Taipei, Taiwan
- Coordinates: 25°03′33.6″N 121°30′54.1″E
- Completed: 1933
- Opened: 1 January 2016

Website
- Official website (in Chinese)

The Taiwan New Cultural Movement Memorial Hall (traditional Chinese: 臺灣新文化運動紀念館; simplified Chinese: 台湾新文化运动纪念馆; pinyin: Táiwān Xīn Wénhuà Yùndòng Jìniànguǎn; Wade–Giles: T'ai^{2}-wan^{1} Hsin^{1}-wen^{2}-hua^{4} Yün^{4}-tung^{4} Chi^{4}-nien^{4}-kuan^{3}) is a memorial hall in Dadaocheng, Datong District, Taipei, Taiwan.

== History ==
The memorial hall building was originally constructed in 1933 during the Japanese rule of Taiwan as the police headquarters of Taihoku Prefecture. The memorial hall was established on 1 January 2016.

== Exhibitions ==
The memorial hall exhibits the history of New Cultural Movement and culture of Dadaocheng. The ground floor of the building houses the permanent exhibition and the upper floor houses the special exhibition.

== Transportation ==
The memorial hall is accessible within walking distance south of Daqiaotou Station of Taipei Metro.

== See also ==
- List of tourist attractions in Taiwan
