= Chen Dexing Ancestral Hall =

Ancestral shrine in Datong, Taipei, Taiwan

- 陳德星堂
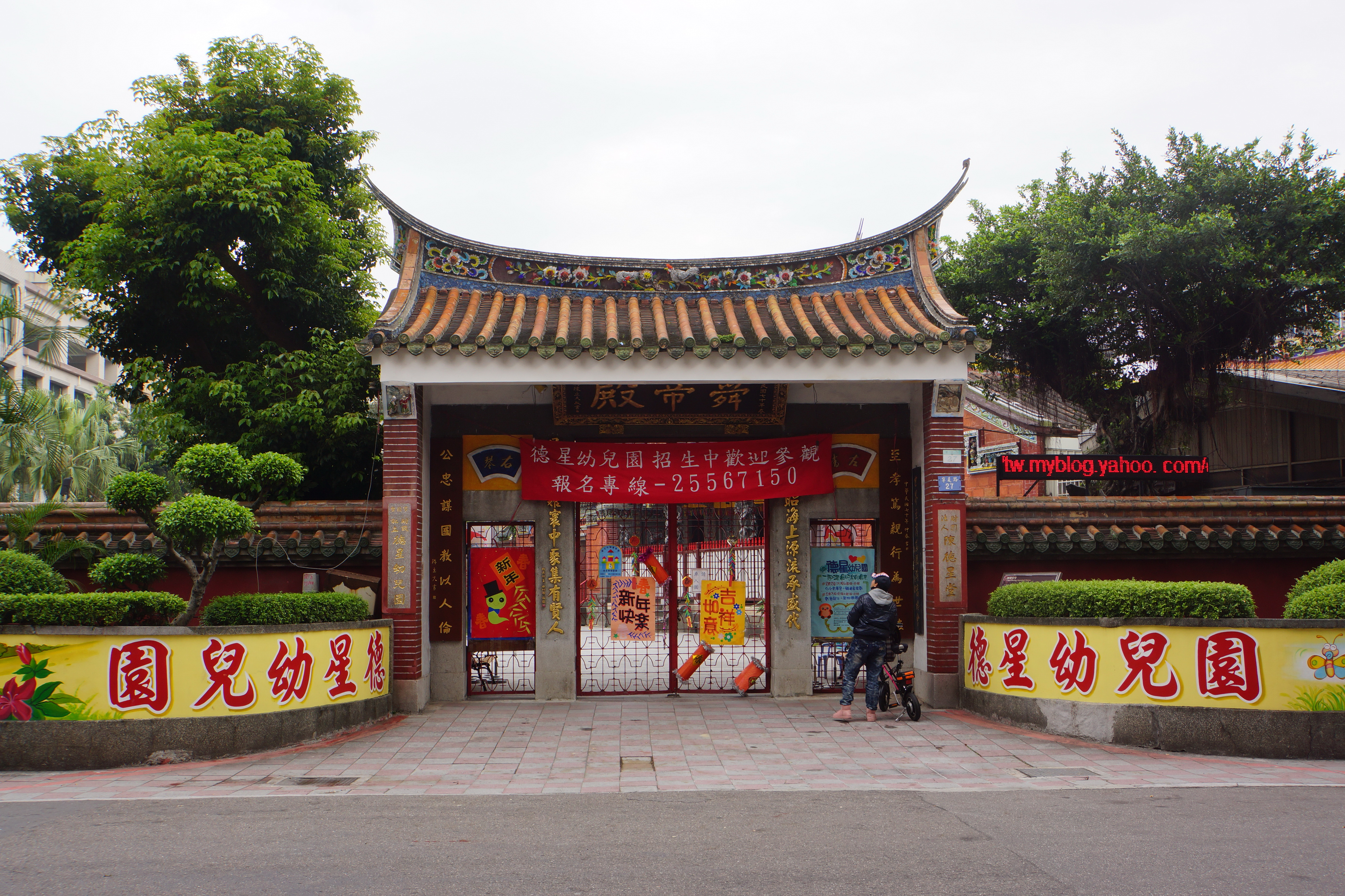

- Location within Taiwan

General information
- Type: ancestral shrine
- Architectural style: southern Fujian
- Location: Datong, Taipei, Taiwan
- Coordinates: 25°3′20.4″N 121°30′57.8″E
- Completed: 1892 (original building); 1911 (current building)

Design and construction
- Architect: Ch'en Ing-pin

The Chen Dexing Ancestral Hall (traditional Chinese: 陳德星堂; simplified Chinese: 陈德星堂; pinyin: Chén Déxīng Táng) is an ancestral shrine in Datong District, Taipei, Taiwan.

== History ==
The hall was originally built in 1892 during the reign of the Guangxu Emperor. The hall was confiscated by the Japanese government to make the Office of the Governor-General of Taiwan at the original site along with Lin Family Ancestral Hall. The hall was then rebuilt in 1911 at its present location.

== Architecture ==
The hall was designed by Ch'en Ing-pin using southern Fukienese architectural style. There is a double dragon column in front of the hall.

== Transportation ==
The hall is accessible within walking distance southwest of Shuanglian Station of Taipei Metro.

== See also ==
- Chinese ancestral veneration
- Taipei Confucius Temple
- Dalongdong Baoan Temple
- Taipei Xia-Hai City God Temple
- List of temples in Taiwan
- List of tourist attractions in Taiwan
