= Kuo Chin-fa =

Kuo Chin-fa 郭金發
- Born: 1 March 1944; Daitōtei, Taihoku City, Taihoku Prefecture, Japanese Taiwan (today Datong, Taipei, Taiwan)
- Died: 8 October 2016 (aged 72); Lingya, Kaohsiung, Taiwan
- Occupations: Singer, songwriter
- Years active: 1959–2016
- Musical career
- Origin: Taiwan
- Genre: Hokkien pop
- Instrument: vocals

Kuo Chin-fa (Chinese: 郭金發; pinyin: Guō Jīnfā; Pe̍h-ōe-jī: Koeh Kim-hoat; 1 March 1944 – 8 October 2016) was a Taiwanese singer.

Born in 1944, Kuo entered a singing completion at the age of 15, and two years later, began working on his first album with Yeh Chun-lin. His best-known work, a rerecording of the song "Hot Rice Dumpling," was released in 1959. Shortly after the original was released in 1949, the Kuomintang had begun censorship of Taiwanese Hokkien, limiting Hokkien pop on the airwaves, and banning performances of "Hot Rice Dumpling." Kuo's popularity rose during the 1960s, and lasted throughout his career, which spanned over 100 albums. The Chinese Taipei national baseball team used "Hot Rice Dumpling" as its theme song at the 2006 Asian Games.

While performing in Fengshan, Kaohsiung on 8 October 2016, Kuo collapsed on stage and was taken to Kaohsiung Armed Forces General Hospital, where he was declared dead. The next day, the Kaohsiung District Prosecutors' Office announced that Kuo had died of cardiorespiratory failure.
