= Customs Museum =

Museum in Datong, Taipei, Taiwan

- 海關博物館
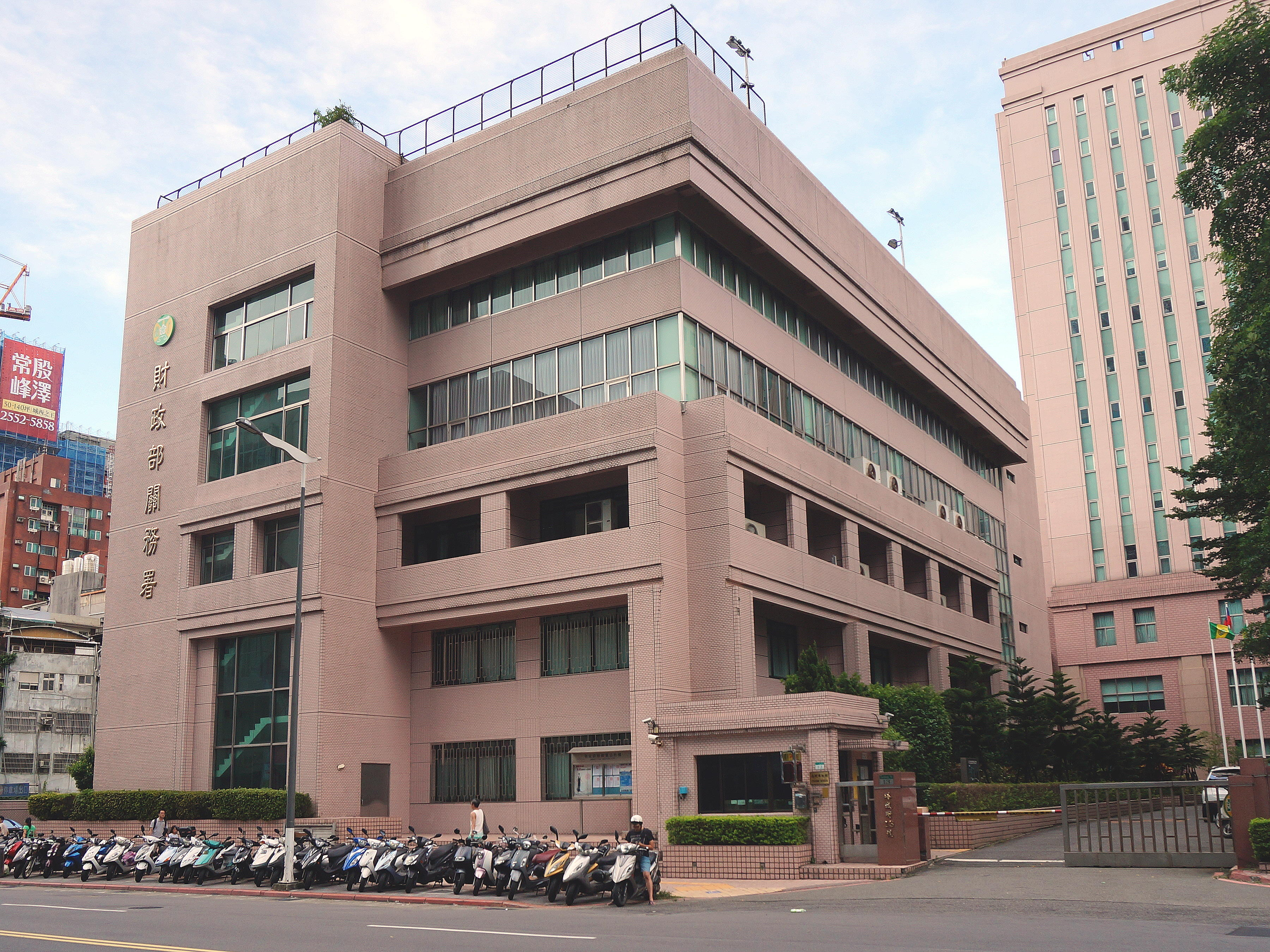
- Established: 1996
- Location: Datong, Taipei, Taiwan
- Coordinates: 25°03′05″N 121°30′38″E
- Type: museum
- Owner: Customs Administration
- Website: Official website

The Customs Museum (traditional Chinese: 海關博物館; simplified Chinese: 海关博物馆; pinyin: Hǎiguān Bówùguǎn) is a museum concerning the customs service in Datong District, Taipei, Taiwan. The museum is located inside the Customs Building.

== History ==
The discussion to set up the museum was brought up by Customs Administration in 1987. The museum was opened ten years later in 1996.

== Exhibitions ==
The museum exhibits various scale models of lighthouse and historical uniforms and artifacts.

== Transportation ==
The museum is accessible within walking distance northwest from Taipei Main Station.

== See also ==
- List of museums in Taiwan
