= Tamsui line =

Former railway line in Taipei, Taiwan

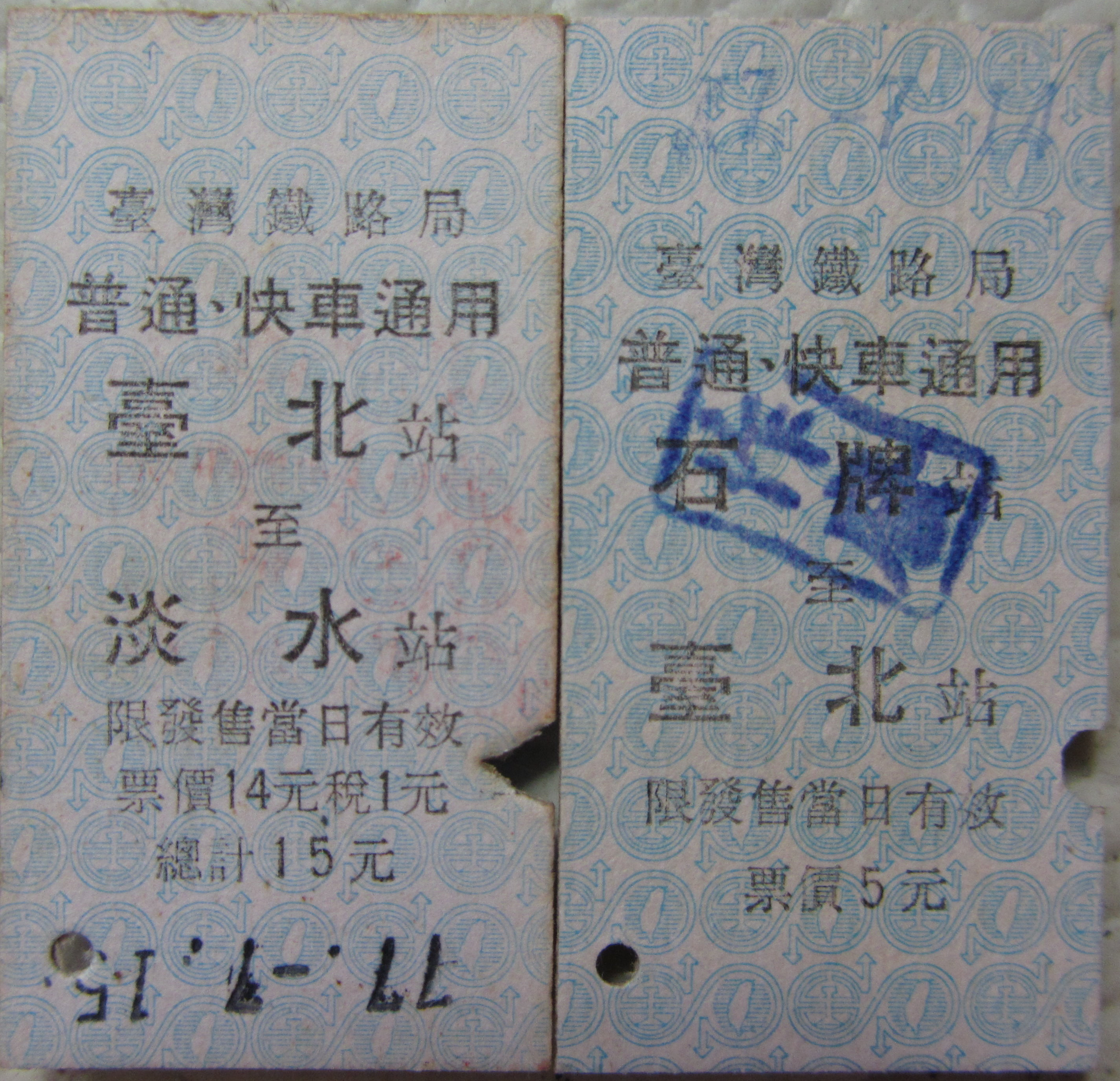
- Edmondson railway ticket issued on the final day of operations on the TRA Tamsui line

Overview
- Locale: Taipei and New Taipei
- Termini: (Dadaocheng) Taipei Railway Station; Tamsui
- Stations: 17 (in total); 11 (at time of closure)

Service
- Type: Defunct branch line
- Operator: Taiwan Railways Administration

History
- Opened: 25 August 1901
- Closed: 15 July 1988

Technical
- Line length: 21.2 km (13.2 mi)
- Number of tracks: single-track with passing sidings
- Track gauge: 3 ft 6 in (1,067 mm)

The Tamsui line or Damtsui line (Chinese: 淡水線; Hanyu Pinyin: Dànshuǐ xiàn; Tongyong Pinyin: Danshuei xian; Pe̍h-ōe-jī: Tām-chúi sòaⁿ) was a railroad branch line located in the cities of Taipei and New Taipei operated by the Taiwan Railways Administration (TRA). It connected the city of Taipei with the town of Tamsui. The route is currently served by the Tamsui–Xinyi line on the Taipei Metro.

== History ==
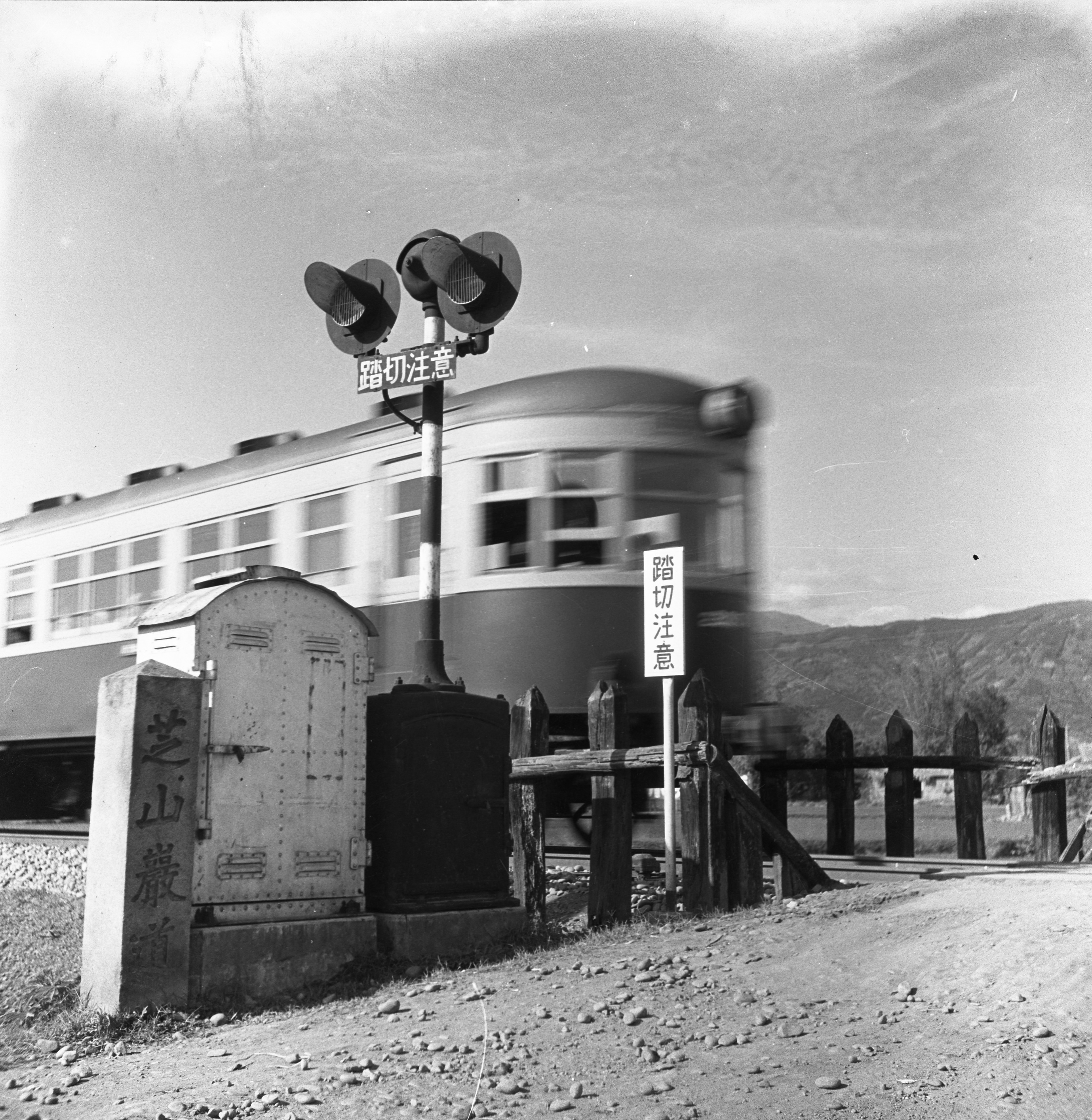
Damtsui line petrol railcar passing Shibayama Iwamichi (today's Shuangshee St.) level crossing in 1935

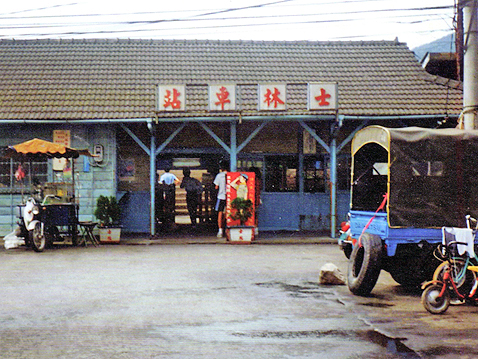
Shihlin station (Shirin eki) during the Taiwan Railways era

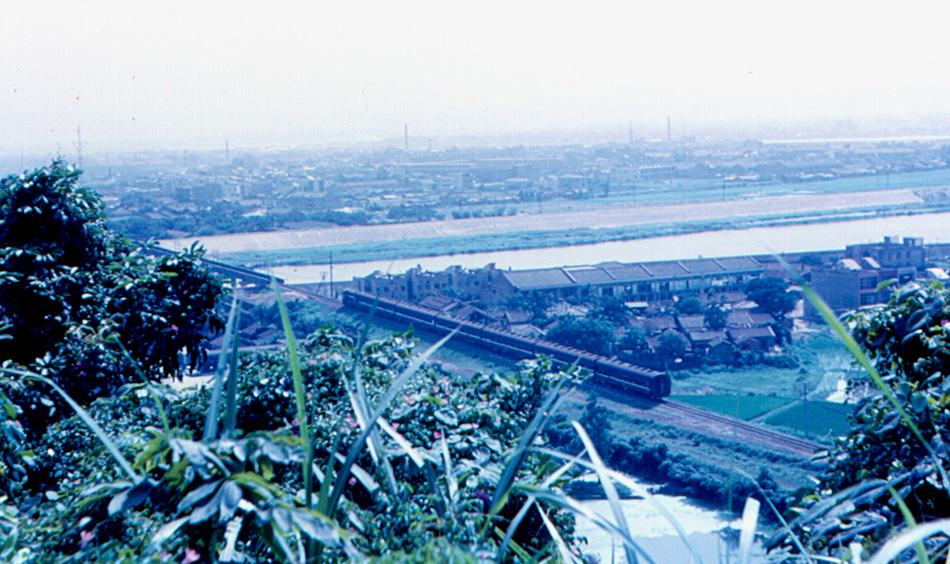
Damtsui line train operating next to Keelung River, as seen from the Grand Hotel in 1967

After Japan gradually occupied Taiwan in 1895 (during Japanese rule), the main transportation port was still the Port of Tamsui. Traditionally, materials were transported from Tamsui Port "upriver" in small canoes. To improve the surface transport capacity from Tamsui Port to Taihoku and the rest of Taiwan, the Ministry of Railways in the Taiwan Directorate-General arranged to utilize the railway materials reclaimed from the reconstruction of the Taihoku-Shinchiku segment of the Ching-dynasty West Coast Main line to survey and layout a railway line along the east bank of the Tamsui river. This became known as the Tamsui line. The construction cost of the Tamsui line was much less than the original plan, costing only 720,000 yen. This line was also used to transport new railway construction materials imported from Japan, and ballast stone from a quarry near Shilin.

The Tamsui line officially opened on 25 August 1901, with five stations (see initial timetable below). Eventually a total of 17 stations were operational, two of which (Dadaocheng, Beimen), located south of Taipei Railway Station were closed to passenger traffic by 1916 and 1923 respectively (the former station, located on a branch, continued to be used by freight trains until 1937). Changan and Jiantan Stations were shut down in 1950. In 1954 a temporary Fuxinggang Station was built for the 9th annual Taiwan Province Games, which closed after the games ended. A spur track known as the Asia Branch line located before Tamsui Station provided access to the British Merchant Warehouse operated (until 1945) by Rising Sun Petroleum, and after that by Royal Dutch Shell, which was closed in 1971 and the surviving track was heritage-listed along with the British Merchant Warehouse in 2000. In addition, Tatung Company had a freight siding located between Shuanglian and Yuanshan Stations, which was originally built during World War II, finally opened on 7 October 1946 and closed on 1 March 1980. Another spur line, the Hsin Peitou line, opened in 1916 to provide easier access to the Beitou Hot Springs. The Tamsui line and Hsin Peitou line were formally closed on 15 July 1988; however, the Taiwan Railway Administration ran the route once more the next day. The Tamsui and Hsin Peitou lines was later demolished to make way for the Taipei Metro Tamsui line and Xinbeitou branch line, which currently operates along a route similar to the original TRA route.

== Infrastructure ==
The Tamsui line was a single track line with passing sidings at most stations. Sidings range from just over 1 mile apart to the maximum distance between Zhuwei and Tamsui which was a 2.6-mile segment. Because of the limited capacity, the maximum operable headway was every half-hour. Passing sidings that allows trains to pass each other on the single track were located in: Shuanglien, Yuanshan, Shilin, Beitou, and Zhuwei. Service north of Beitou was more intensive. The entire line was token-worked; tokens (staff) must be exchanged at most stations for onwards movement authority. Trains taking about 45 minutes to travel end-to-end sometimes had to meet as many as four trains travelling in the opposite direction.

== Route characteristics ==
- Operating jurisdiction: Taiwan Railway Administration
- Route distance: 21.2 km between Taipei and Tamsui
- Gauge: 1,067 mm
- Number of stations: 11 (when line was abandoned, including both termini)
- Opened: 25 August 1901
  - 1916: Dadaocheng Station was converted to a freight-only station, southern terminus was moved to North Gate Station
  - 2 March 1923: North Gate Station was abolished, southern terminus was moved to Taipei Main Station
  - 1937: segment between Dadaocheng Freight Station and Taipei Main Station was officially abandoned
- Abolition: 15 July 1988 was the last day of operations; line was formally abandoned the following day, on July 16
- Taiwan's first railway branch line to be connected to the trunk line network
- Taiwan's first railway branch line to be converted to a mass rapid transit line

== Vehicle assignment ==
The regular train was hauled by R0 or R20 class diesel-electric locomotive, typically with four ordinary non-air-conditioned coaches. In the 1960s through the 1970s, S200, S300, and S400 class diesel electric locomotives commonly hauled short commuter trains on the Tamsui line. After the project to convert the East Coast Main line to 1,067 mm gauge (from an earlier ~800 mm narrow gauge), the displaced diesel-hydraulic locomotive DH200 class was converted for a period of service on the Tamsui line.

The last train was hauled by R20-class locomotive R53, with extra passenger cars attached.

=== Passenger Timetables ===
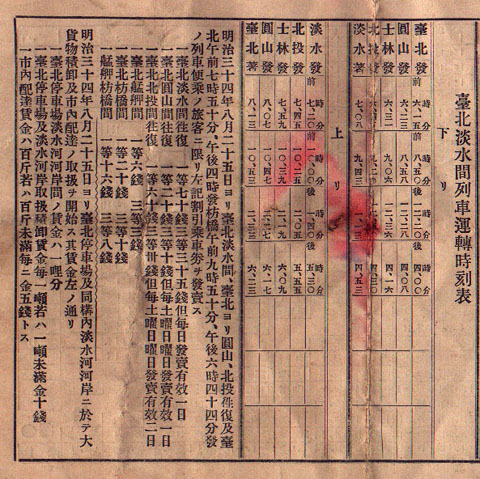
25 October 1901 public schedule in the Taiwan Daily New News

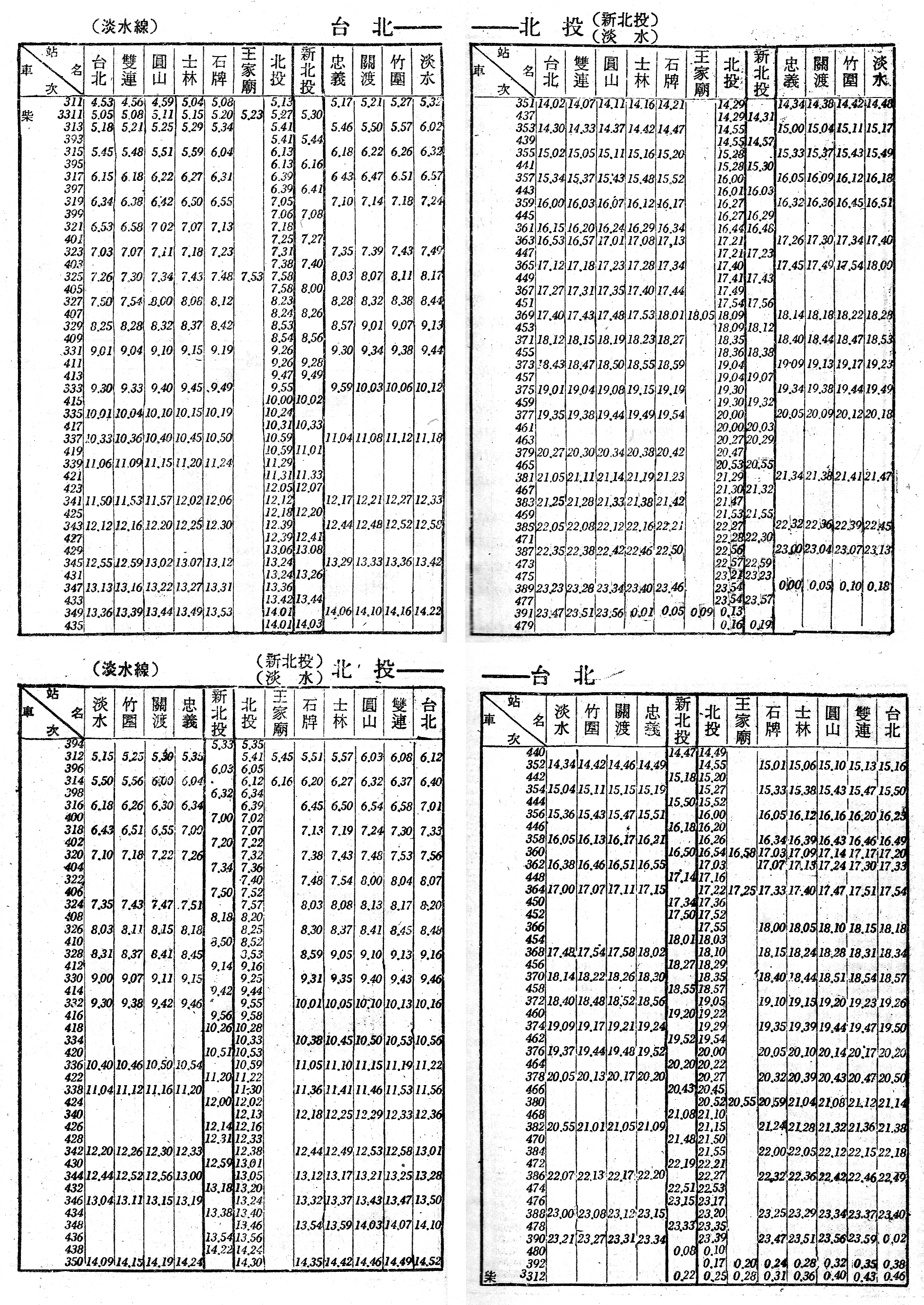
1967 passenger schedule

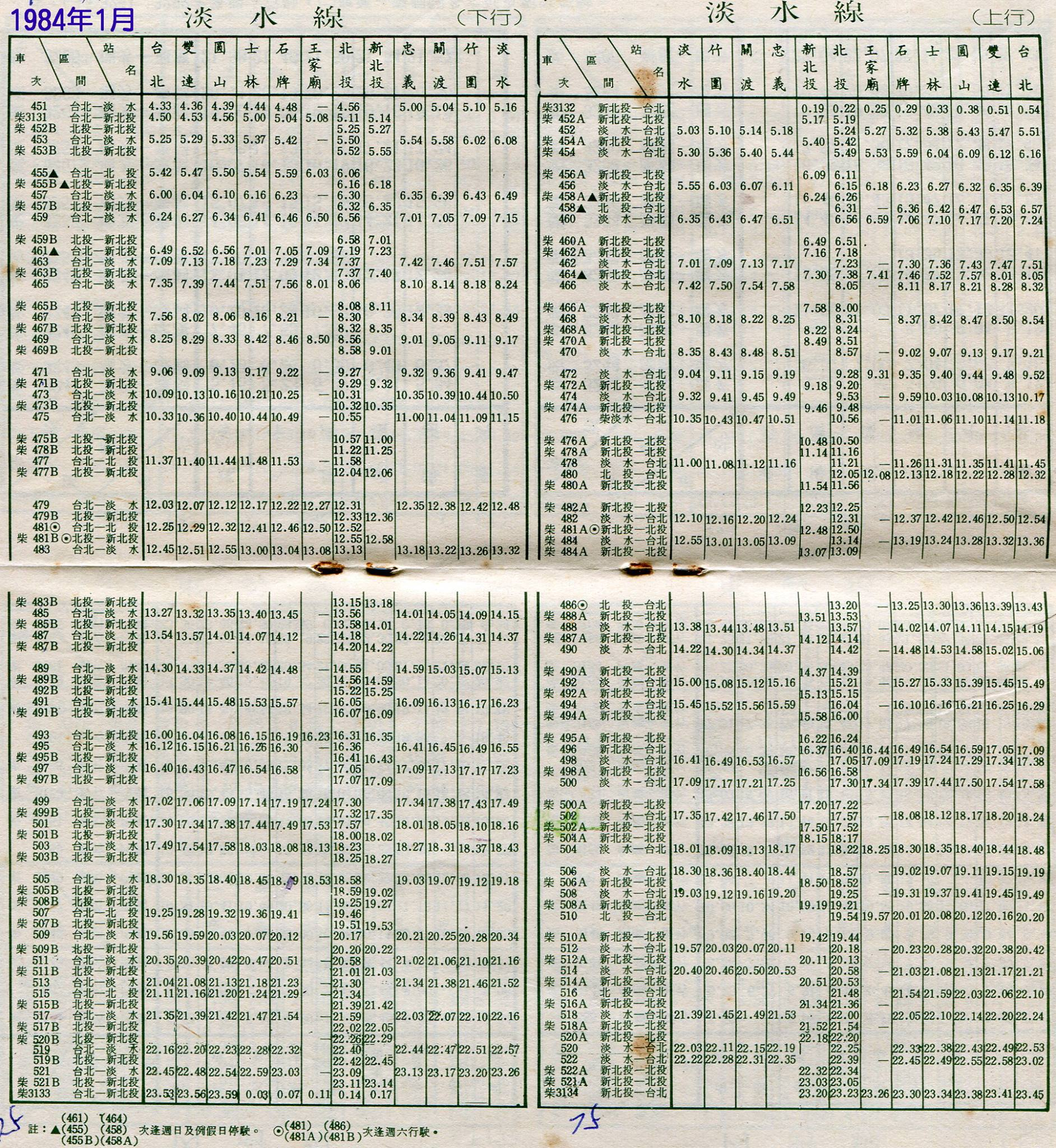
January 1984 timetable

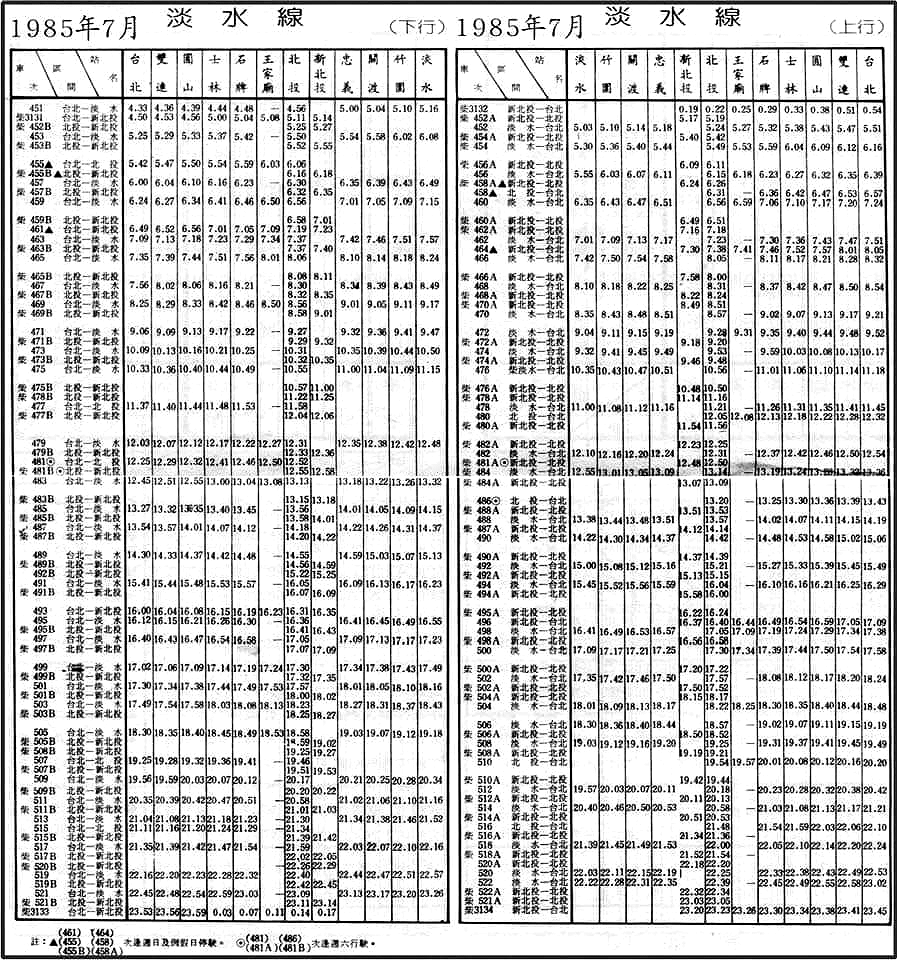
July 1985 timetable

1985 stringline diagram

== See also ==
- Xindian railway line
