= Shuanglian metro station =

Metro station in Taipei, Taiwan

Shuanglian / SB02 雙連
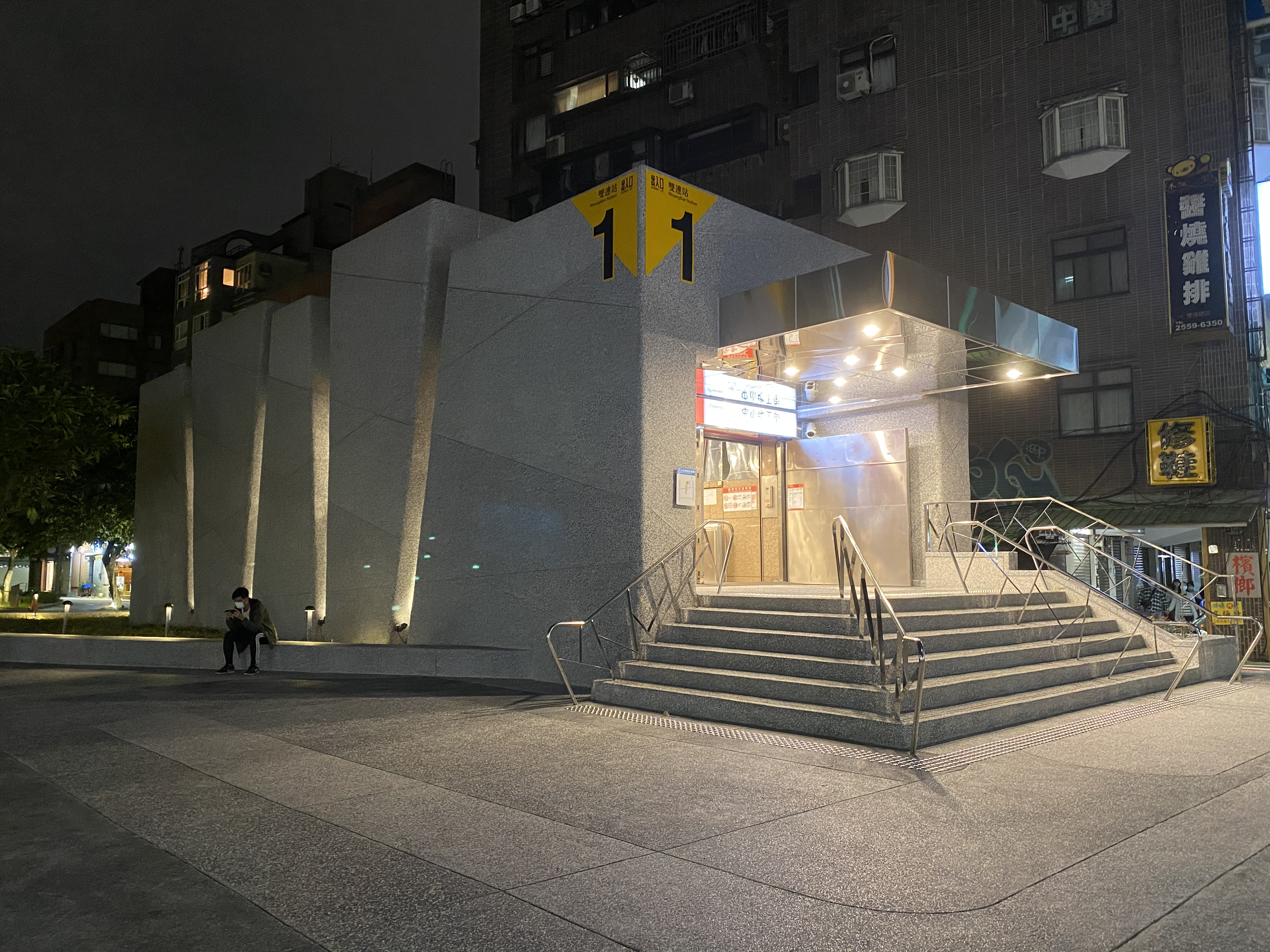
- Exit 1 of Shuanglian station after renewal

Chinese name
- Traditional Chinese: 雙連
- Simplified Chinese: 双连
- Literal meaning: Double link
Transcriptions
Standard Mandarin
- Hanyu Pinyin: Shuānglián
- Bopomofo: ㄕㄨㄤ ㄌㄧㄢˊ
- Wade–Giles: Shuang¹-lien²
Hakka
- Pha̍k-fa-sṳ: Sûng-lièn
Southern Min
- Tâi-lô: Siang-liân

General information
- Location: 47 Minsheng W Rd; Zhongshan and Datong Districts, Taipei; Taiwan
- Coordinates: 25.0578°N 121.5207°E
- System: Taipei metro station
- Lines: Tamsui–Xinyi line Minsheng–Xizhi line (planning)

Construction
- Structure type: Underground
- Cycle facilities: Access available

Other information
- Station code: / SB02
- Website: web.metro.taipei/e/stationdetail2010.asp?ID=R12-054

History
- Opened: 1997-03-28

Passengers
- 2017: 19.468 million per year ▲0.92%
- Rank: (Ranked 41 of 119)

Services
Preceding station	Taipei Metro	Following station
Zhongshan towards Xiangshan or Daan	Tamsui–Xinyi line	Minquan West Road towards Tamsui or Beitou
Location

Shuanglian (Chinese: 雙連; pinyin: Shuānglián, formerly transliterate as Shuanglien Station until 2003) is a metro station in Taipei, Taiwan, served by Taipei Metro. It is a station of the Tamsui–Xinyi line and a planned transfer station with the Minsheng–Xizhi line.

== Station overview ==
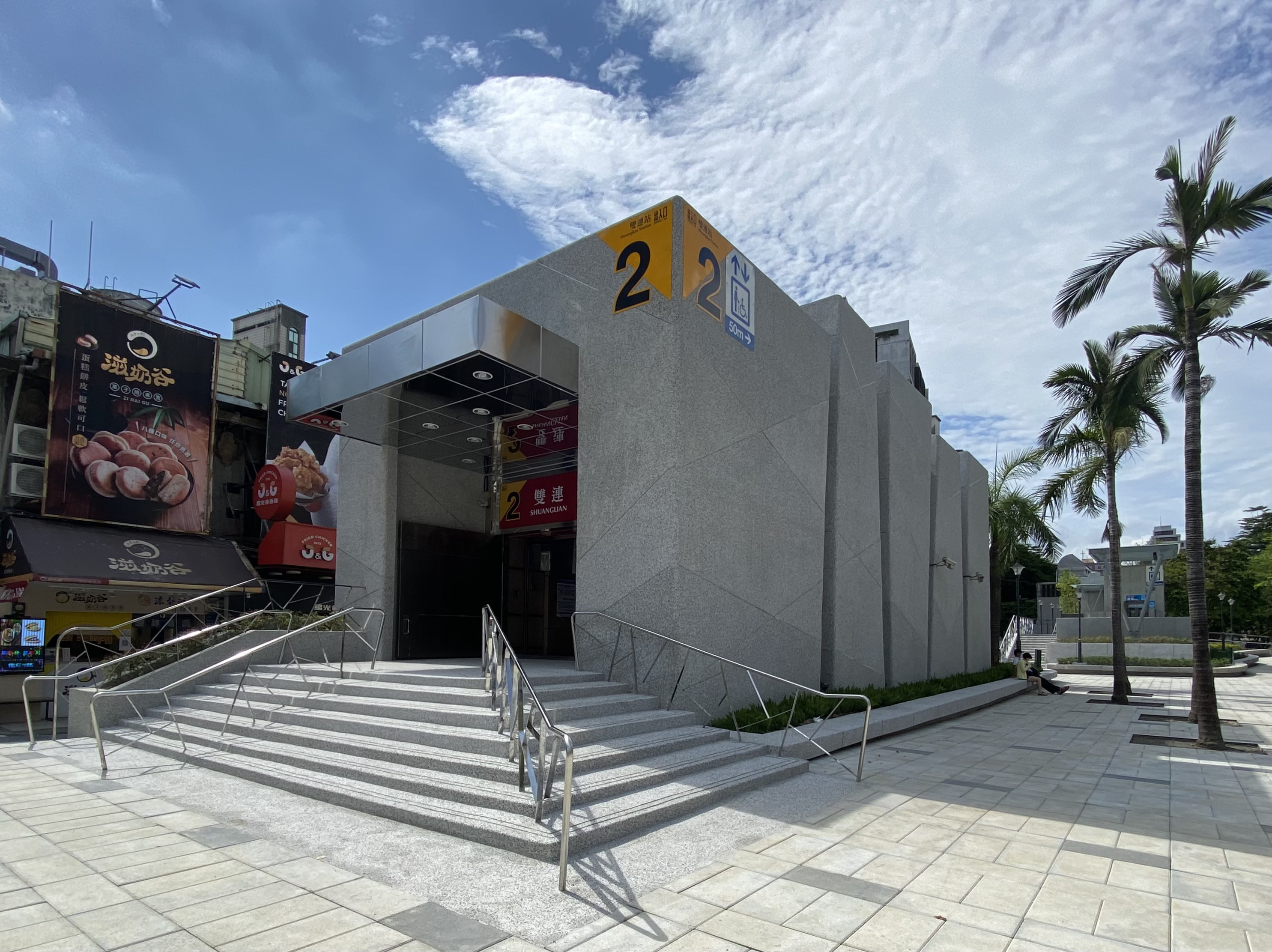
Exit 2 of Shuanglian station after renewal

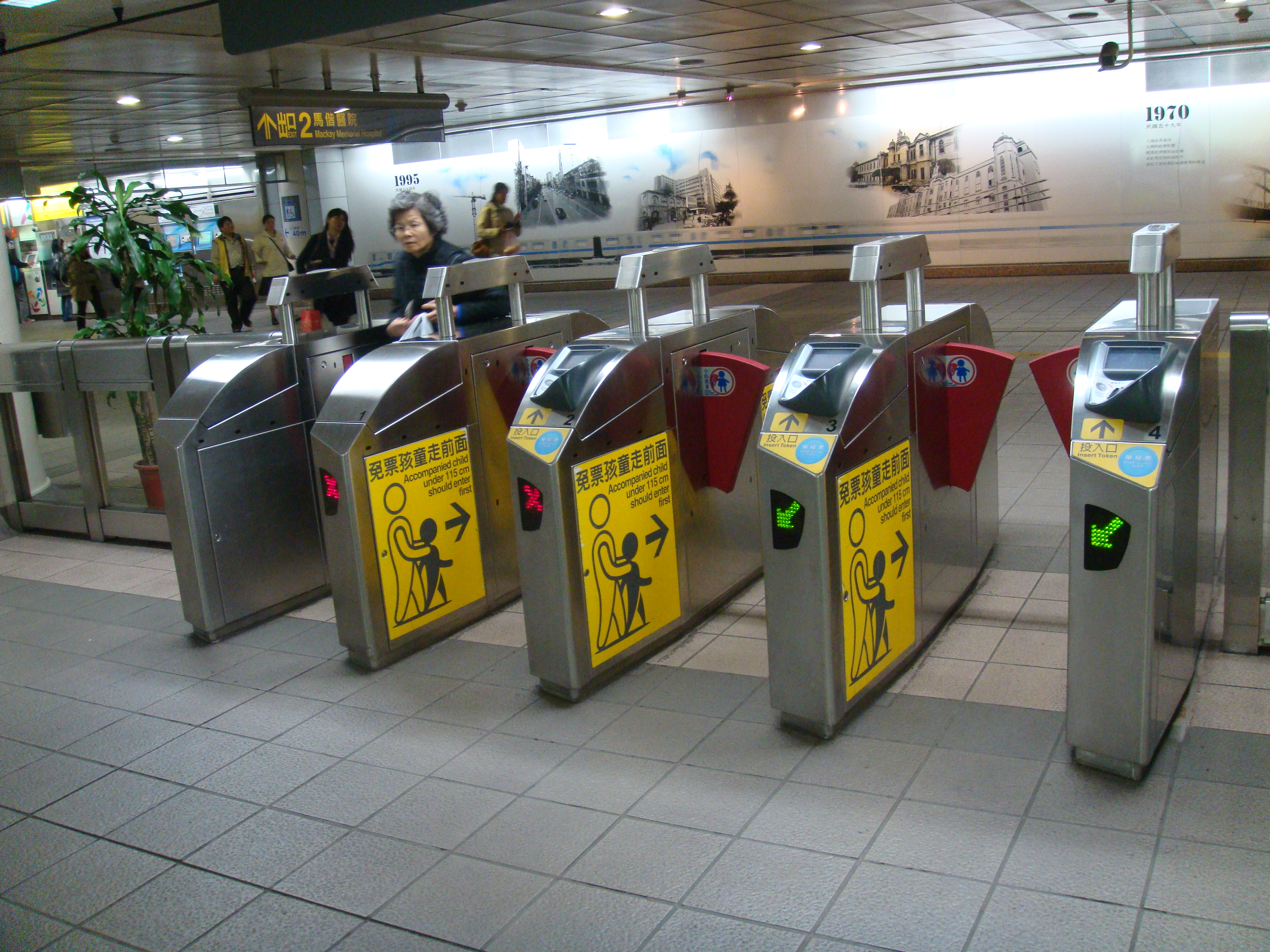
Shuanglian station faregates

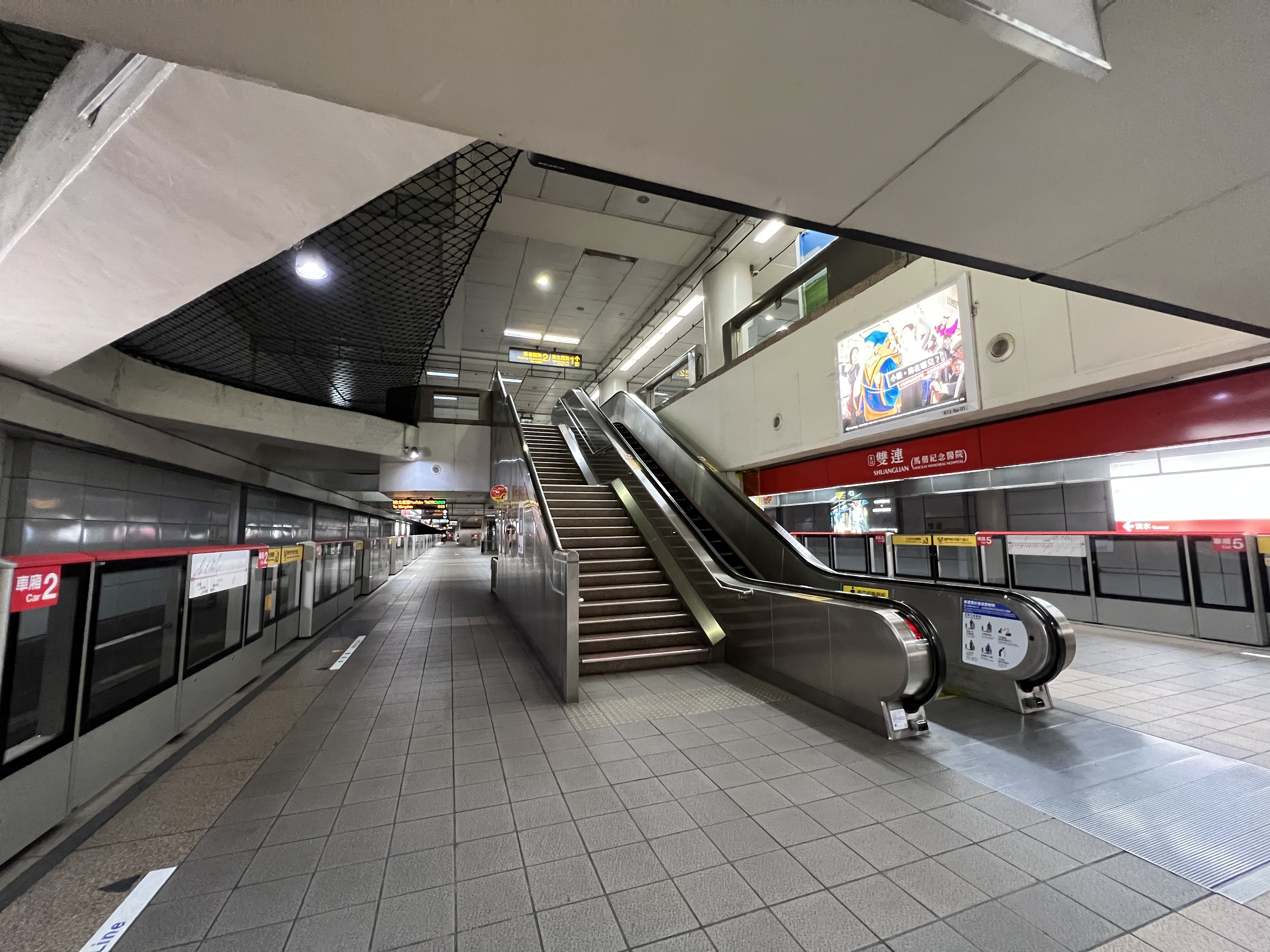
Platform

The station is located underneath the metro park, near Minsheng West Road and Zhongshan North Road. It is a two-level, underground structure with one island platform and two exits. The washrooms are inside the entrance area.

Public art in the station consists of a mural titled "Dawning Sail". Composed of porcelain enamel, the mural reflects Shuanglian's rich historical past from its role as a once-prosperous trading post on the Tamsui River to new developments in the area.

The station is a planned transfer station with the Minsheng-Xizhi Line.

== History ==
=== Taiwan Railway Station ===
- The station was originally opened on 17 August 1916 as "Soren Station" (Japanese: 雙連乘降場).
- 1943: The station re-opened after renovation.
- In the past, there was a goods loading center near the station. Thus, it became a major transfer center on the Tamsui Line.
- 15 July 1988: Closed along with the TRA Tamsui Line.

=== Taipei Metro Station ===
- July 1993: DORTS decided to use the station as one of the trial stations for public art installations.
- 28 March 1997: Opened for service with the opening of the segment from Tamsui to Zhongshan.

== Station layout ==
Street level	Entrance/exit	Entrance/exit, Metro Park
B1	Concourse	Lobby, information desk, automatic ticket dispensing machines, one-way faregates
B1	Concourse	Zhongshan Metro Mall (south side of the station), Restrooms (in the underground mall)
B2	Platform 1	← Tamsui–Xinyi line toward Tamsui / Beitou (R13 Minquan West Road)
B2	Island platform, doors will open on the left
B2	Platform 2	Tamsui–Xinyi line toward Xiangshan / Daan (R11 Zhongshan) →

=== Exits ===
- Exit 1: Minsheng W. Rd.
- Exit 2: Minsheng W. Rd.

== Other metro services ==
The station is an entrance to the Zhongshan Underground Metro Mall, connecting (between this station, Zhongshan station and Taipei Main Station).

== Around the station ==
- Chen Dexing Ancestral Hall
- Immaculate Conception Cathedral
- Ministry of Labor
- Taiyuan Asian Puppet Theatre Museum
- Mackay Commemorative Hospital
- Taipei Rapid Transit Corporation Headquarters
- Tatong District Main Office
- Taipei Imperial Hotel
- Minxiang Park
- Taipei City Archives
