= Chiang Chia =

Taiwanese football manager

Chiang Chia 江洽
Personal information
- Date of birth: 29 September 1942 (age 84)

Managerial career
- Years: Team
- 1981–1985: Chinese Taipei

Chiang Chia (Chinese: 江洽, born 29 September 1942 in Datong, Taipei) is former manager of Chinese Taipei national football team. He currently teaches in National Taipei College of Business.

Chiang, majoring in physical education, graduated from Taiwan Provincial College of Physical Education in the year of 1965. After finishing his military service, he became a teacher and a coach in primary education and worked hard to promote football activities. He has served in many positions in Chinese Taipei Football Association and taken on the responsibility of national team manager during 1984 Summer Olympics and 1986 FIFA World Cup.
