= Dihua Street =

Street in Taipei, Taiwan

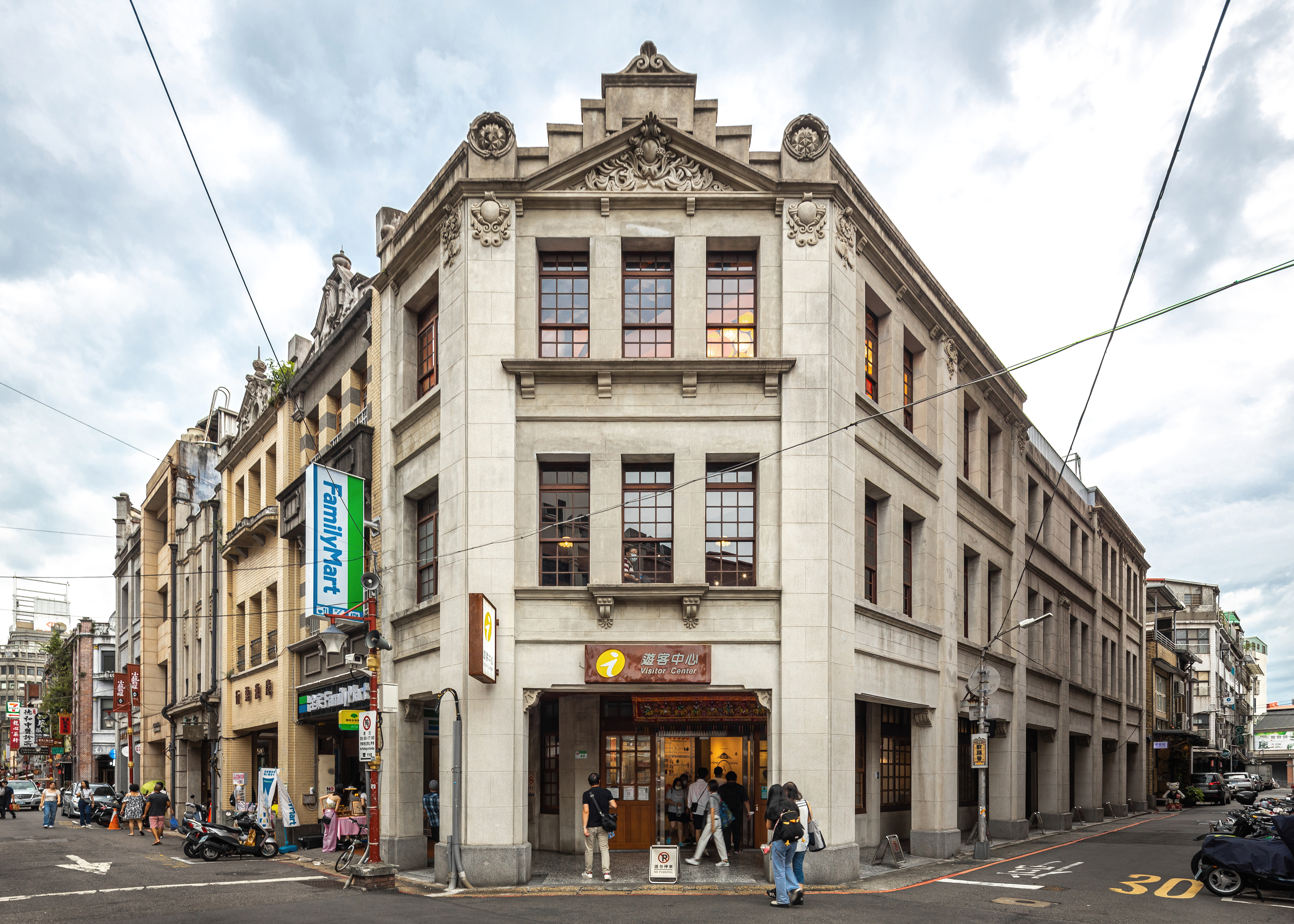
- Dadaocheng Visitor Center in 2023

- Location within Taiwan
- Native name: 迪化街 (Chinese)
- Former name: Center Street
- Type: Street
- Location: Datong, Taipei, Taiwan
- Coordinates: 25.066552°N 121.509948°E

Construction
- Completed: 1850s

Dihua Street (Chinese: 迪化街; pinyin: Díhuà Jiē) is a street located in Dadaocheng, Datong District, Taipei, Taiwan, winding from the south of the district to the north near Dalongdong. The street, then known as Centre Street (中街), was constructed during the 1850s, when many commercial entities belonging to Quanzhou-originating owners moved in from Bangka. Since then and throughout the rest of the 19th century, Dihua Street has been an important centre for commerce in Taiwanese products and produce such as Chinese medicinal herbs, fabrics, incense materials, and for the post-processing of Taiwanese tea.

Being the oldest street in Taipei (with sections in existence since the rule of Dutch Formosa from 1624 to 1661), its architecture has been under preservation and conservation efforts by the city. Modern Dihua Street along with its surrounding neighborhood and streets, known as the Dihua Street commercial loop (迪化街商圈), remain one of the most commercially active in Taipei with transactions in excess of 3 billion US dollars.

The name "Dihua" was given in 1947 by the Republic of China government, in reference to the city of Dihua (now called Ürümqi) in Xinjiang, and effectively joins a string of existing older streets in this area of Taipei. Locals living in the district refer to the northern portion of the street (north of the Minsheng West Road (民生西路)) as “north street” (北街), and the southern portion as “south street” (南街).

== New Year's Market ==
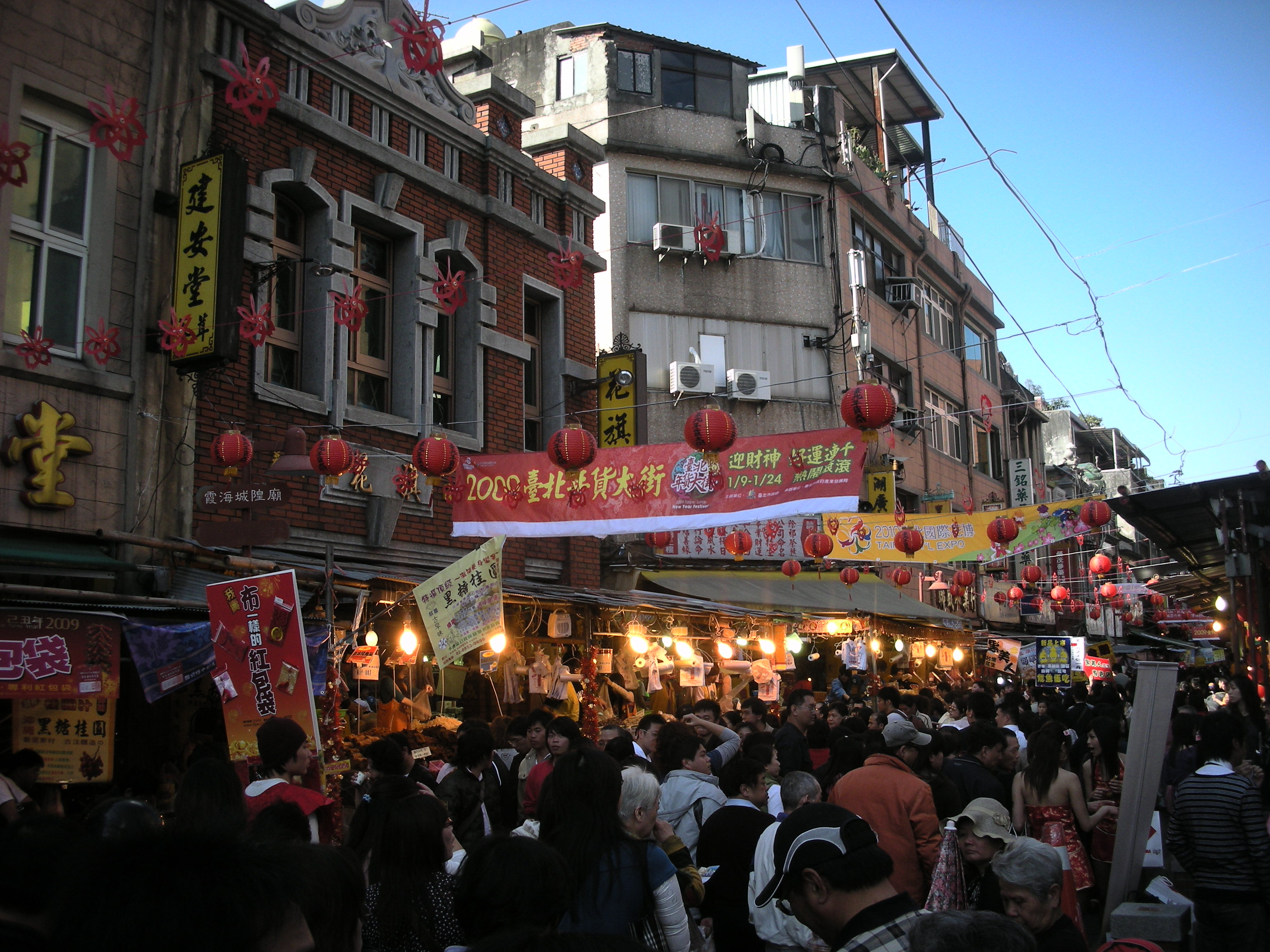
New Year's Market

The street is a major destination during Lunar New Year festivities. Dihua Street bustles with people during the weeks before Chinese New Year, with 750,000 people visiting the street in the two weeks leading up to the holiday. Shoppers flock to the street during these times to buy necessities for the festivities. Holiday season sales is an important source of revenue for local merchants.

== See also ==
- List of roads in Taiwan
- List of tourist attractions in Taiwan
