= Hot Rice Dumpling =

1949 song composed by Zong-Hiu, Dung-Qiung

- 燒肉粽
- Hàn-jī: 燒肉粽
- Pe̍h-ōe-jī: Sio Bah-chàng
- Tâi-lô: Sio Bah-tsàng

Hot Rice Dumpling (燒肉粽; Tâi-lô: Sio Bah-tsàng) originally named "Selling Rice Dumpling" (賣肉粽), is a popular Taiwanese song from the post-war period in Taiwan. It was composed and published in 1949 (38th year of the Republic of China) by Chang Chiu Tung-sung. The original singer is unknown, but it became a hit for Kuo Chin-fa and was later covered in Cantonese by Guo Bining-jian. As for the Mandarin adaptation, it features a song titled "配對成雙" (Pairing Up in Pairs) which has been sung by various artists including Yao Su-jung, Chang Siao-ying, Ling Zhen, Shu Ya-song, and Chen Jie, with lyrics by Zhuang Nu.

== Background ==
When creating the song "Selling Rice Dumpling", Taiwan was facing an economic depression in the post-war era, with both the inflation and unemployment rates reaching new heights. The lyrics fully reflect the difficult living conditions of the people at the time and were widely acclaimed by the public. However, due to the negative and melancholic portrayal of the post-war livelihood in the lyrics, the song was banned by the Government Information Office. Kuo Chin-fa renamed the song to "Hot Rice Dumpling" and changed the first line of the lyrics from "Lamenting one's fate as a person with a tumultuous destiny" to "remembering the vivacity of childhood," and re-recorded and released it.

== Motivation ==
According to Mrs. Chang Chiu Dong-song's recollection, one night, after grading papers for her students at Taipei Municipal Jinhua Junior High School (now Jinhu Junior High School), Zhangqiu Dong-song and his wife started chatting. Suddenly, they heard the desolate cry of "Mài Sio Bah-tsàng" (賣燒肉粽) coming from the mouth of the alley. She thought that hungry people would be moved by this familiar call, but who would pity their hardships of life? So she suggested that Zhangqiu Dong-song write a song for this vendor.

== Lyrics meaning ==
A young man who had left school, unable to find employment and lacking the necessary funds to start a business, resorted to temporarily selling meat dumplings on the street. The lyrics also allude to the inflation and hardship experienced by this street vendor.

== Follow up ==
- In 1973, Kuo Chin-fa performed at Taiyangcheng Cafe (太陽城餐廳) on Linsen North Road in Taipei. A notice from the Taiwan Garrison Command was posted backstage at Taiyangcheng Cafe, stating that during the performance of "Hot Zongzi", the audience should be informed that in early Taiwan, life was difficult and street vendors sold zongzi in bamboo baskets or on bicycles. Nowadays, with the affluence of Taiwan, zongzi is sold by motorcycle or in stores.
- Due to the widespread popularity of "Hot Zongzi", all sellers of rice dumplings in the Republic of China are commonly referred to as "Hot Zongzi", such as in the "Hot Zongzi Incident" that occurred in the early hours of March 5, 1986.
- In 1984, a variety show segment on China Television's "Flying to the Rainbow" (飛上彩虹) entitled "Mr. and Mrs. Zhao" (趙先生與趙太太), featured street vending as its theme. Hosts Fong Fei-fei and Allen Chao sang "Hot Zongzi" together, but before starting the second verse, Fong Fei-fei added the lyrics " fried bread stick cooked in soya milk and salty cakes; a little rest when it rains, and when it's cold or hot, we're the first ones to suffer", while Allen Chao added the lyrics "Do you have any empty bottles, used and broken utensils or paper recyclables to sell?" to the song ”Do you have any empty wine bottles for sale?” (有酒矸通賣無). On February 18, 2012, a special program commemorating the passing of Fong Fei-fei, titled "Flying to the Rainbow: Fong Fei-fei Memorial Special" (飛上彩虹 鳳飛飛懷念特輯) was aired on China Television's main channel, which included this clip up until the beginning of the second verse.
- In the midst of the 2006 Asian Games, the organizing committee selected a lively and upbeat version of "Hot Zongzi" as the cheering song for the Chinese Taipei national baseball team in the Asian Games baseball event. The song received high praise from both the audience and the team. However, there is still no consensus on the lead singer of the rock version that was played at the event.
- In 2006, the Taichung City Government held the "Taichung Rice Dumpling Festival" and selected the "Golden Rice Dumpling". On May 18, 2006, Kuo Chin-fa was invited by Taichung Mayor Jason Hu to perform "Hot Zongzi" in public at the Taichung City Government, and served as the spokesperson for the selection of the "Golden Rice Dumpling.
- On October 8, 2016, while performing at a concert in honor of the Double Ninth Festival at the National Kaohsiung Center for the Arts, Kuo Chin-fa suddenly collapsed during his rendition of this song. He was rushed to the Kaohsiung Armed Forces General Hospital for emergency treatment, but was pronounced dead at the age of 72. The following day, on October 9, all participants and judges on the singing competition program "Sing Our Dreams" (唱出咱的夢) on the ShinJi Television channel paid tribute to Kuo Chin-fa by singing "Hot Zongzi”.
