= Dalongdong =

Neighbourhood in Taipei, Taiwan

Coordinates: 25.074055°N 121.514067°E

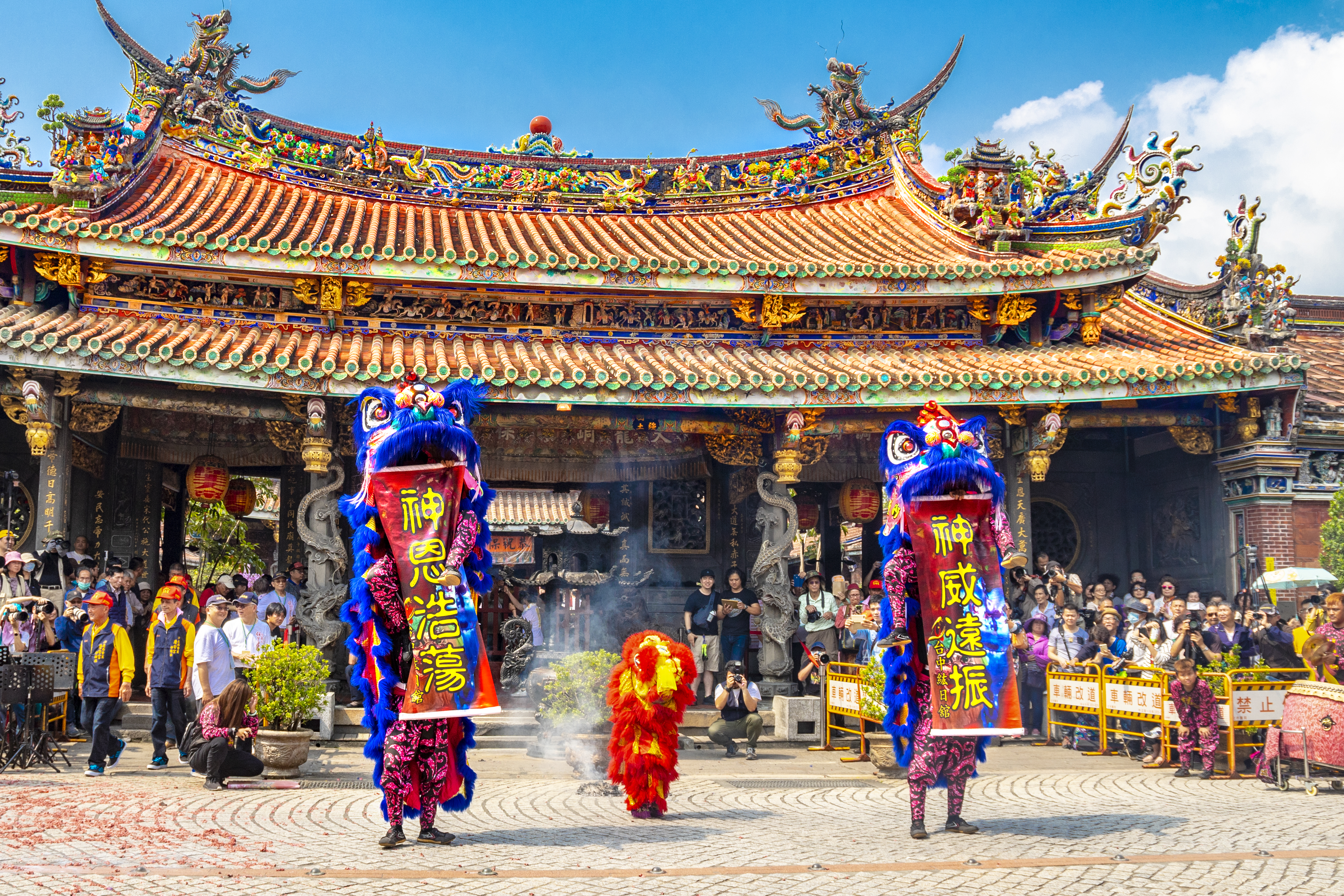
Dalongdong Baoan Temple

Dalongdong (Chinese: 大龍峒; pinyin: dàlóngdòng; Pe̍h-ōe-jī: Toā-liông-tông), or Toalongpong (Chinese: 大龍泵; Pe̍h-ōe-jī: Tōa-lông-pōng; and variants 大浪泵/大隆同), is an old town in historical Taipei located near the narrows of the confluence of the Keelung and Tamsui Rivers.

The settlement, covereing the area extending from the Chen Teacher's Residence (陳悅記祖宅) and beyond the area of sishisikan (Chinese: 四十四坎; Pe̍h-ōe-jī: Sì-cha̍p-sì-khám) and the Taipei Confucius Temple, was officially established in 1853. During Japanese rule, Twatutia, Toalongpong, and Bangka were incorporated with the walled city of Taipeh (in present-day Zhongzheng District) into present-day Taipei city. Dalongdong has since merged with Twatutia in the south to form Datong District.

== Name ==
Although the history of the settlement likely preceded Dutch Formosa rule, its existence was first recorded as Pourompon (from the Basay language). This gave rise to the names Paronpon (Chinese: 巴浪泵; Pe̍h-ōe-jī: Pa-lông-pōng), Daronpon (大龍泵; Toā-lông-pōng) and other variants, when the area came under Qing dynasty rule. The name was once again changed (大隆同; Toā-liông-tông) in 1802 (7th year of Jiaqing Emperor), by settlers from Tong'an District in Xiamen. It was during this period that the Dalongdong Baoan Temple was first constructed. The name finally settled in its present form (大龍峒) during the reign of the Daoguang Emperor (1820–1850) when further settlement occurred in the area.

== Gallery ==
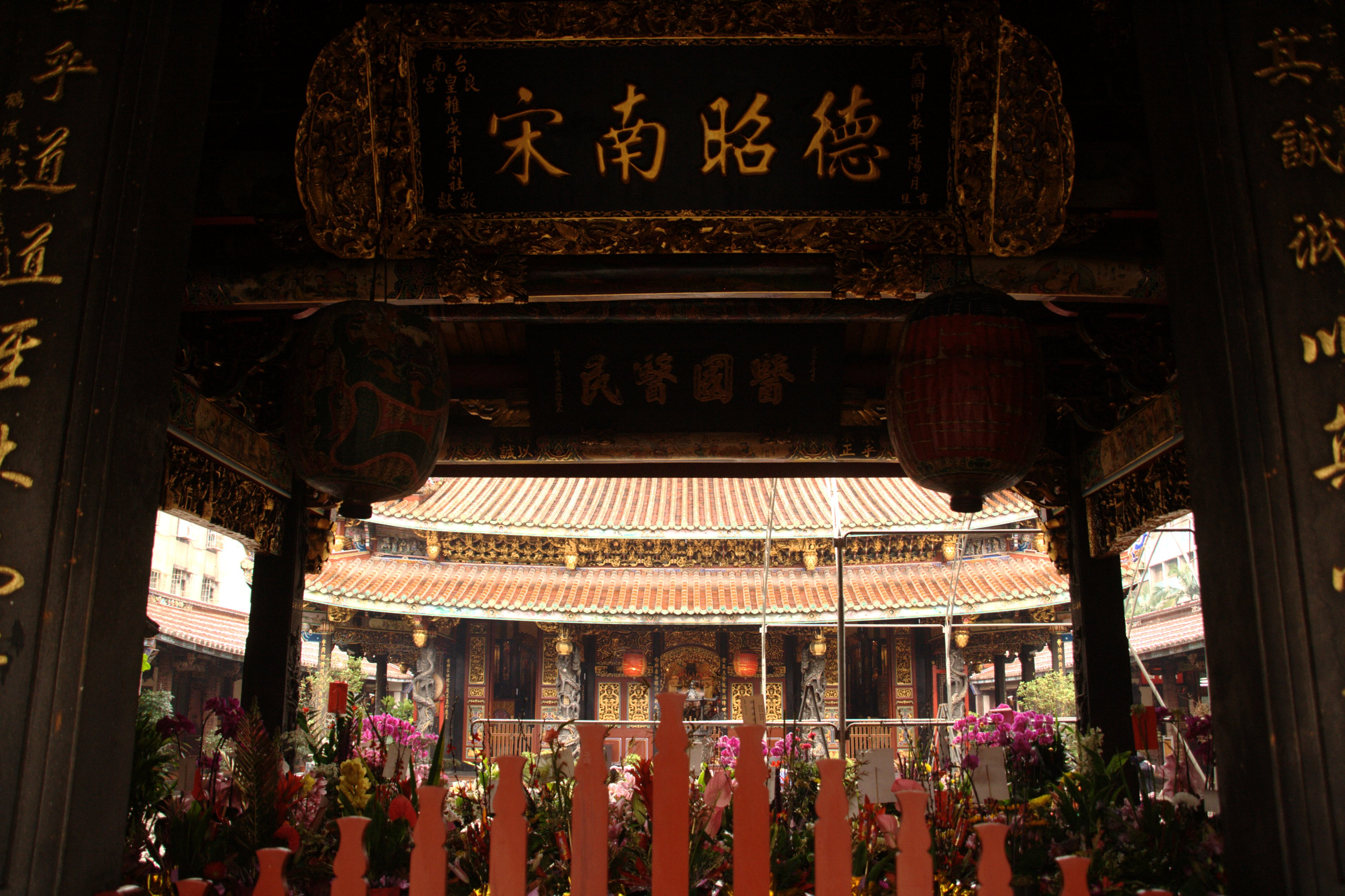
The main hall of the Dalongdong Baoan Temple

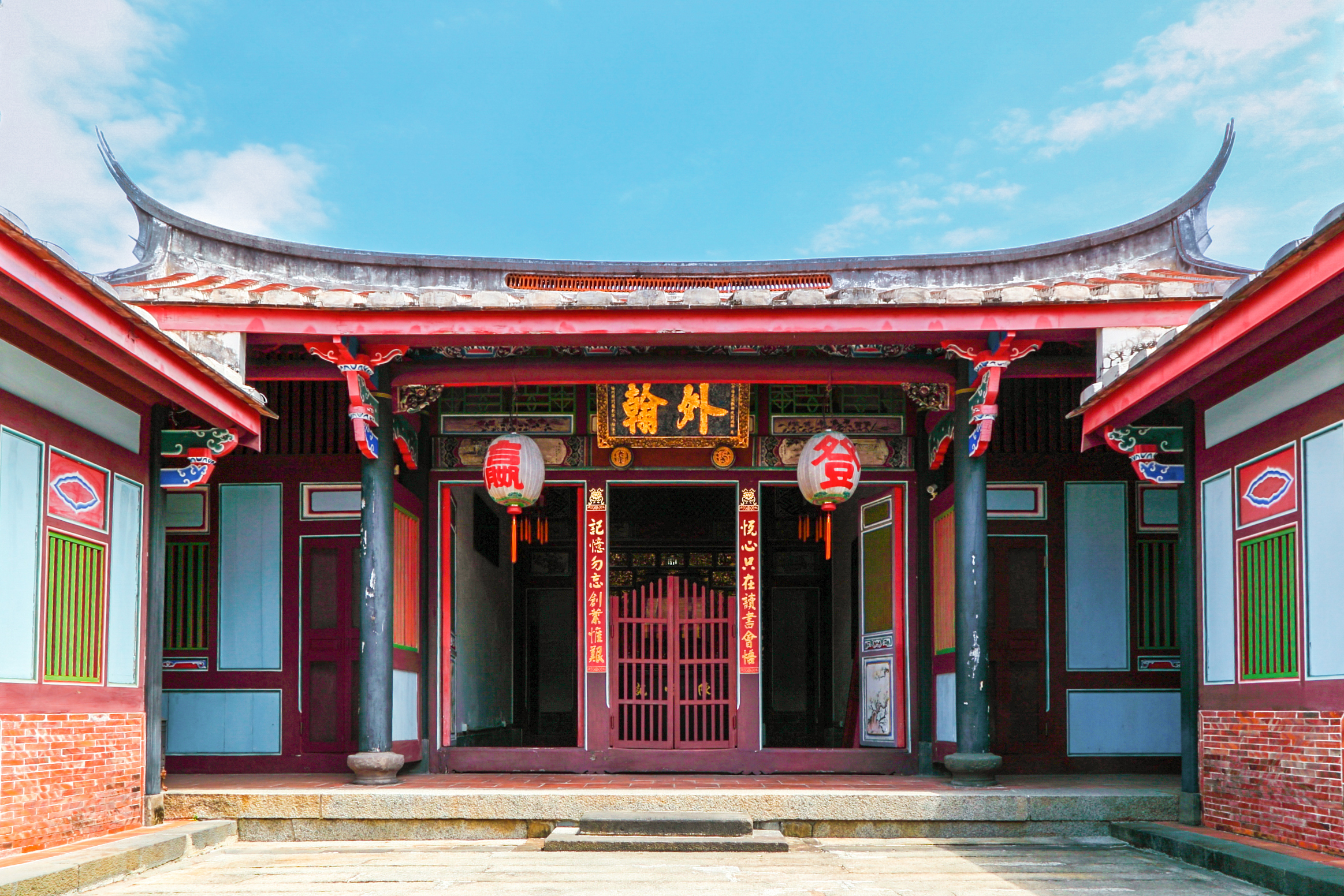
The Chen Teacher's Residence in Dalongdong

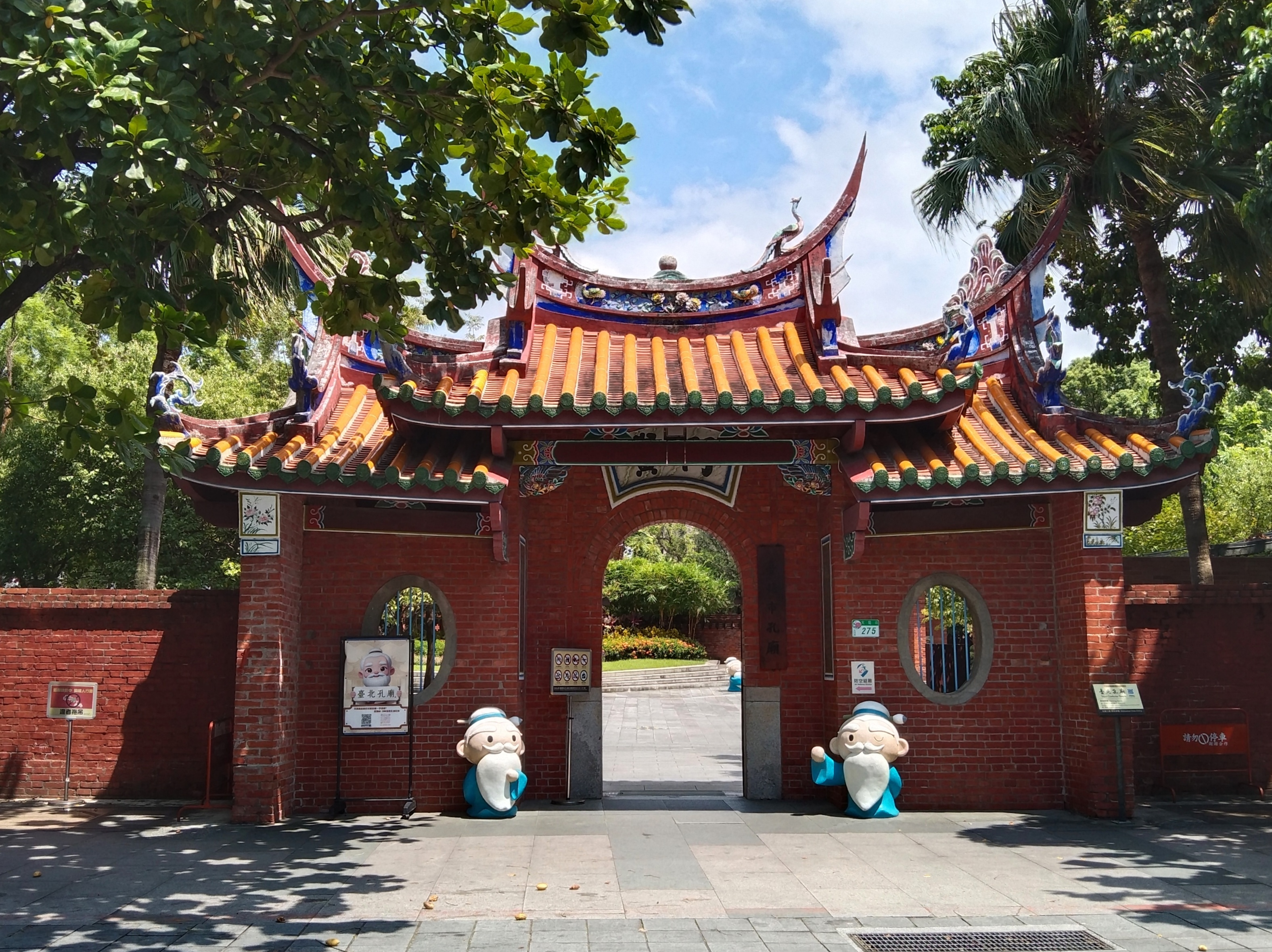
The west entrance to the Taipei Confucius Temple

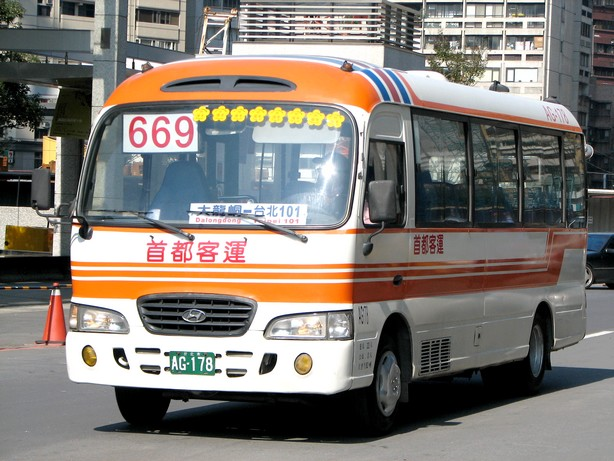
Taipei bus servicing Dalongdong and Taipei 101

== See also ==
- Bopiliao
- Dadaocheng
