= Chen Tian-lai Residence =

Historic house in Datong, Taipei, Taiwan

- 陳天來故居
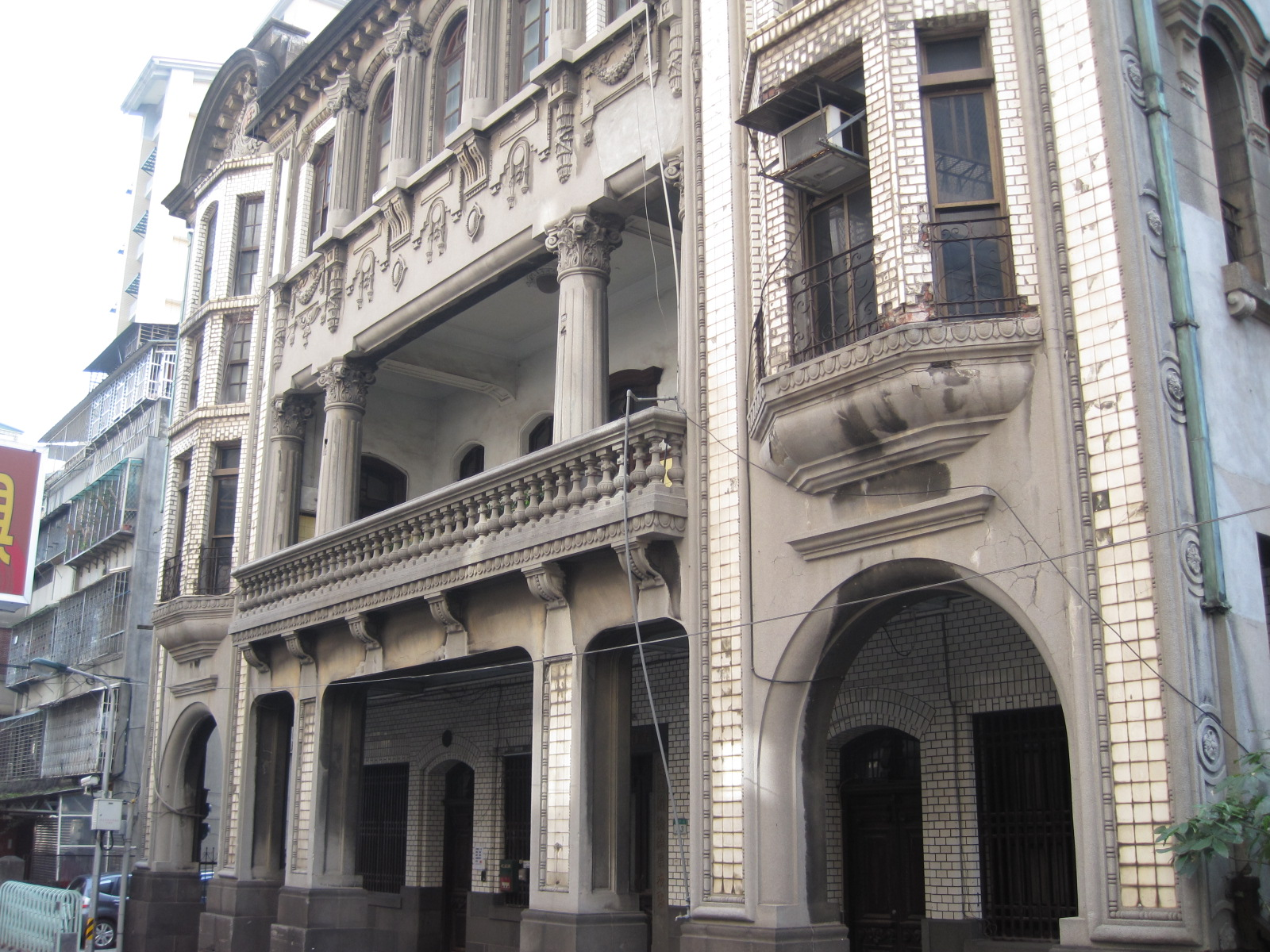
- Interactive map of the Chen Tian-lai Residence area

General information
- Type: former house
- Location: Datong, Taipei, Taiwan, No. 73, Guide Street, Datong District, Taipei City, Taiwan 103
- Coordinates: 25°03′21.9″N 121°30′30.2″E
- Completed: 1920

The Chen Tian-lai Residence (traditional Chinese: 陳天來故居; simplified Chinese: 陈天来故居; pinyin: Chén Tiānlái Gùjū) is a house in Datong District, Taipei, Taiwan. The house was constructed with a Baroque architectural style with a grandiose facade. There is a pond in its backyard. The house was built in the 1920s as the residence of Chen Tian-lai, a wealthy tea merchant at that time. By 2017, the house was jointly owned by more than 30 people and had fallen into disrepair, as the owners could not agree on how to repair it. In 2020, the Taipei government took over the building and announced plans to restore it and surrounding property by 2024.

== See also ==
- List of tourist attractions in Taiwan
