= Customs Administration, Ministry of Finance =

Government agency of Taiwan

Coordinates: 25.051235°N 121.510614°E

Customs Administration, Ministry of Finance 財政部關務署
- Seal of the Customs Administration of the Republic of China

Agency overview
- Formed: 1854 (as Inspectorate General of Customs); 1 January 2013 (as CA)
- Preceding agencies: Inspectorate General of Customs; Directorate General of Customs

Jurisdictional structure
- Operations jurisdiction: Taiwan
- Specialist jurisdiction: Customs, excise, gambling

Operational structure
- Headquarters: Datong, Taipei
- Agency executive: Jao Ping, Director-General
- Parent agency: Ministry of Finance (Taiwan)

Website
- Official website

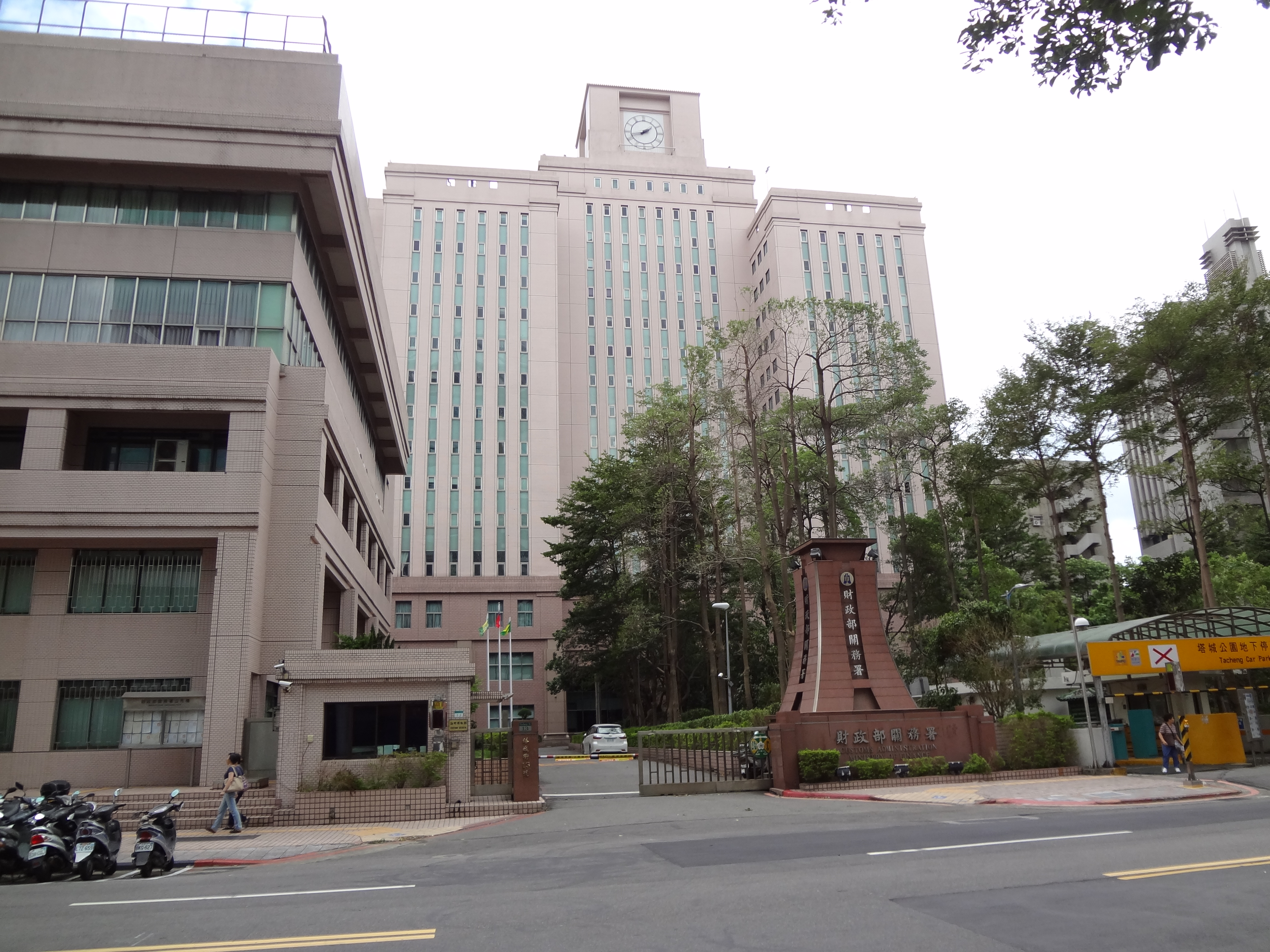
Customs Administration

The Customs Administration, Ministry of Finance (CA; Chinese: 財政部關務署; pinyin: Cáizhèngbù Guānwushǔ), headquartered in Taipei, is the agency of the Ministry of Finance of Taiwan (ROC) dealing with customs policies and regulations in Taiwan. Republic of China is not a member of World Customs Organization but ROC has signed reciprocal customs agreements with ten Customs authorities in the world as of 2022.

== History ==
The administration was originally established in 1854 as the Inspectorate General of Customs. On 3 February 1991, it was renamed to Directorate General of Customs and finally on 1 January 2013, it was renamed to Customs Administration.

== Organizational structure ==
=== Departments ===
- Department of Customs Clearance Affairs
- Department of Tariffs and Legal Affairs
- Department of Investigation
- Department of Information Management
- Department of Valuation and Auditing
- Department of Planning

=== Offices ===
- Secretariat
- Statistics Office
- Accounting Office
- Personnel Office
- Internal Affairs Office
- Civil Service Ethics Office

== Transportation ==
The CA headquarter office is accessible within walking distance north west of Taipei Railway Station.

== See also ==
- Ministry of Finance (Taiwan)
