= Taipei Xia-Hai City God Temple =

- 臺北霞海城隍廟
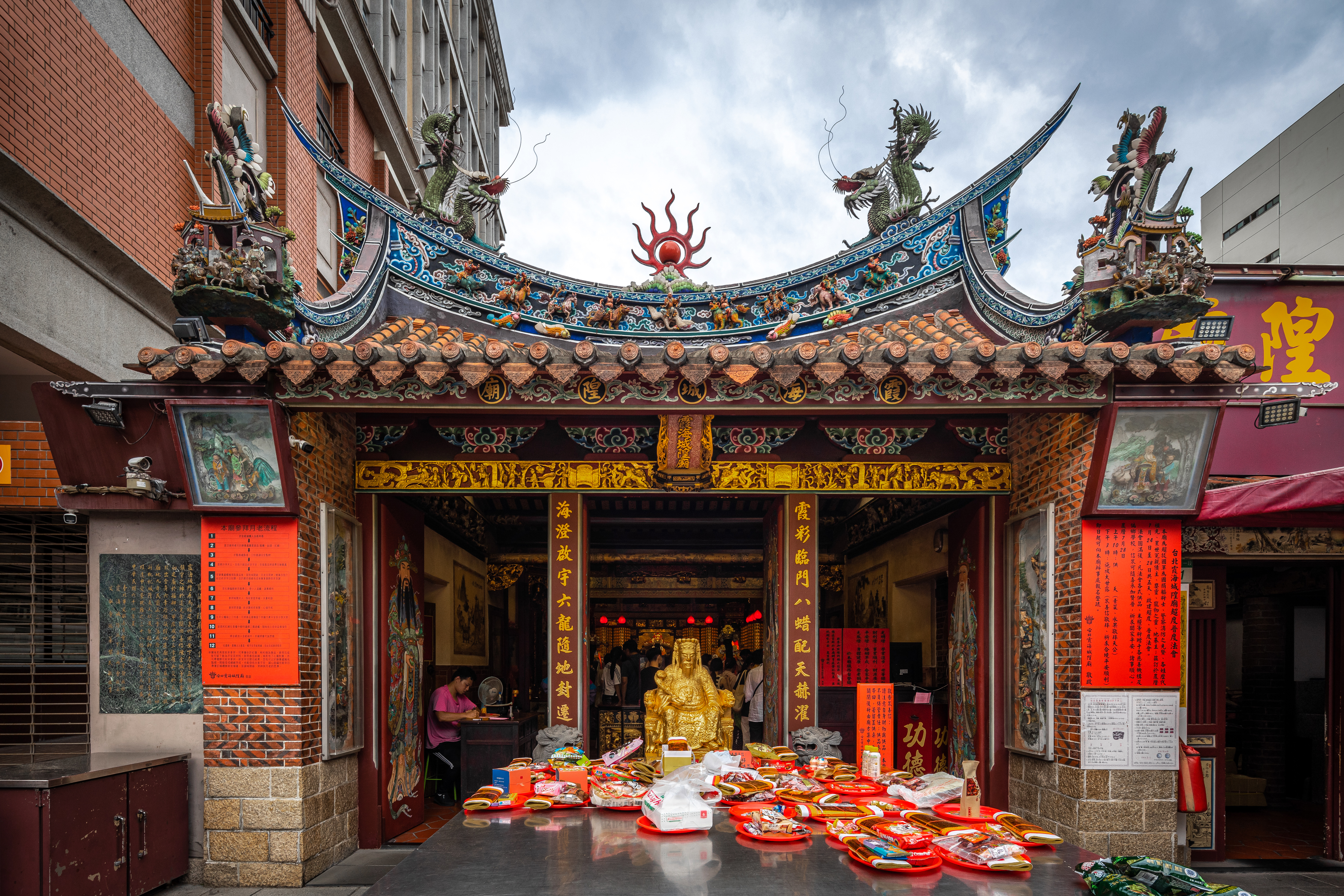
- Taipei Xia-Hai City God Temple in 2023

- Taiwan

Religion
- Affiliation: Taoism
- Deity: City God; Yue Lao

Location
- Location: Datong District, Taipei, Taiwan
- Interactive map of Taipei Xia-Hai City God Temple
- Coordinates: 25°03′20″N 121°30′37″E

Architecture
- Type: Temple
- Completed: 1859

The Taipei Xia-Hai City God Temple (Chinese: 大稻埕霞海城隍廟; lit. 'Dadaocheng Xia-Hai God Temple') is a temple dedicated to the City God or Cheng Huang Ye (城隍爺) in Taipei, Taiwan.

== History ==
The Xia-Hai City God Temple was built in 1859, and maintained by a single family to the present day. The Ministry of the Interior designated the site an historical monument in 1985. It is located on Dihua Street in Twatutia, which is today part of Datong District in Taipei. The temple houses over six hundred deities in its 152 square meters of area, resulting in the highest statue density in Taiwan. Currently, due to the temple enshrining Yue Lao (God of Marriage and Love), it is one of the popular pilgrimage sites among believers in Taiwan who seek for relationships and marriage.
