= Datong District, Taipei =

District in Taipei, Taiwan

Coordinates: 25°03′35″N 121°30′51″E

Datong 大同區
- District
- Datong District
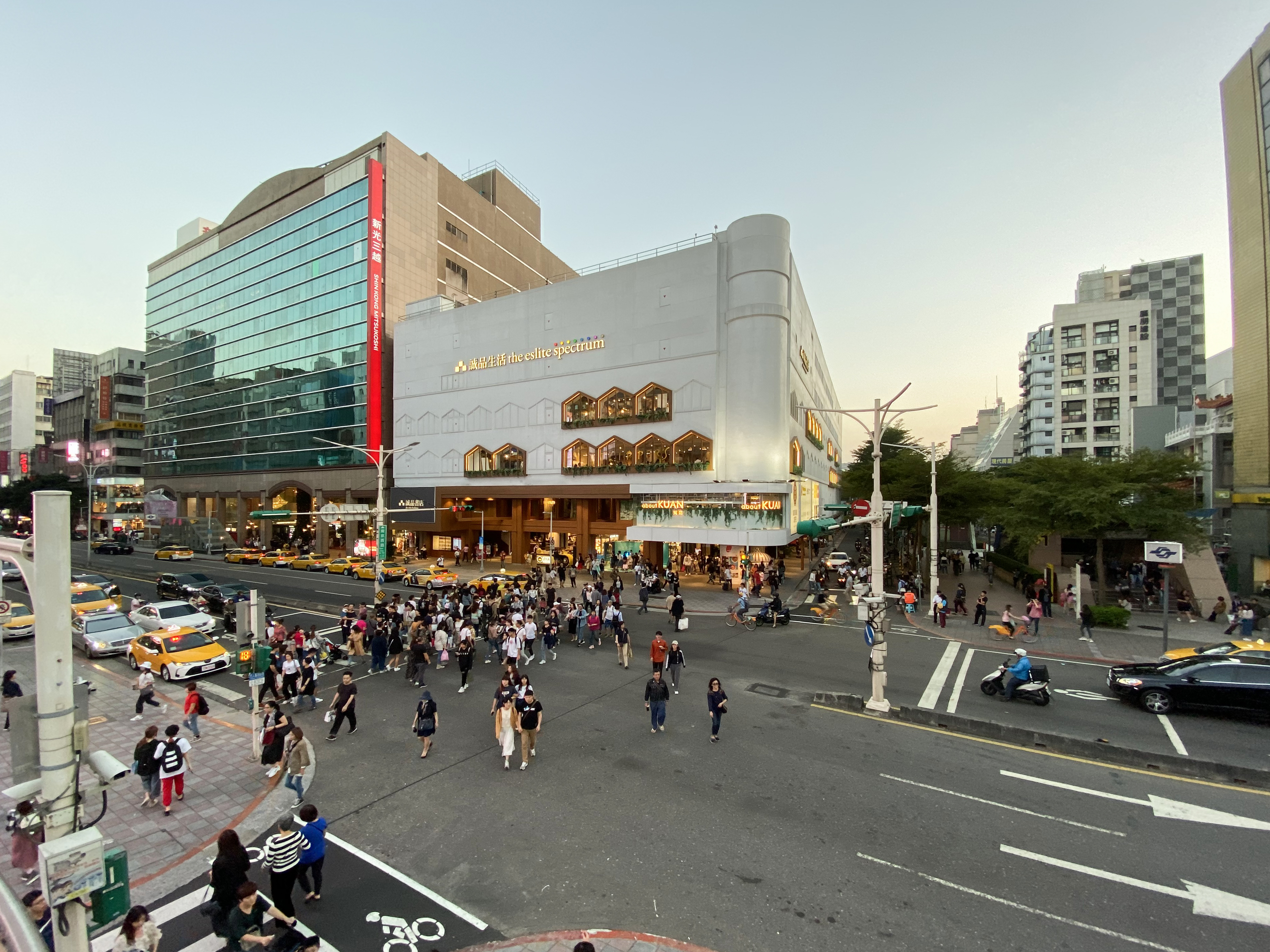
- View of Nanjing West Road

- Country: Republic of China (Taiwan)
- Region: Western Taipei
- Divisions: List: 25 villages; 522 neighborhoods

Area
  - Total: 5.6815 km^{2} (2.1936 sq mi)
  - Rank: Ranked 12th of 12

Population (January 2023)
  - Total: 119,123
  - Rank: Ranked 11th of 12
  - Density: 20,967/km^{2} (54,304/sq mi)
- Postal code: 103
- Website: dtdo.gov.taipei (in Chinese)

Datong District, Taipei
- Traditional Chinese: 大同區
- Literal meaning: Great Harmony District
Transcriptions
Standard Mandarin
- Hanyu Pinyin: Dàtóng Qū
- Wade–Giles: Ta-t'ung Chü
Southern Min
- Hokkien POJ: Tāi-tông-khu

Twatutia (old name)
- Traditional Chinese: 大稻埕
Transcriptions
Southern Min
- Hokkien POJ: Tōa-tiū-tiâⁿ

Datong District or Tatung is a district of Taipei City, Taiwan. It is located between the Taipei Metro Red Line and eastern shore of the Tamsui River, and between Civic Boulevard and the Sun Yat-sen Freeway. The southern part of this district is known as Twatutia, one of the first settlements in what is now Taipei and once the commercial center. Taipei's commercial center has since shifted southeast to Zhongzheng, Da'an and Xinyi, and Datong is far less important economically. Some of the last vestiges of Twatutia's commercial importance is preserved on Dihua Street. The old town of Daronpon is in the northern part of the district.

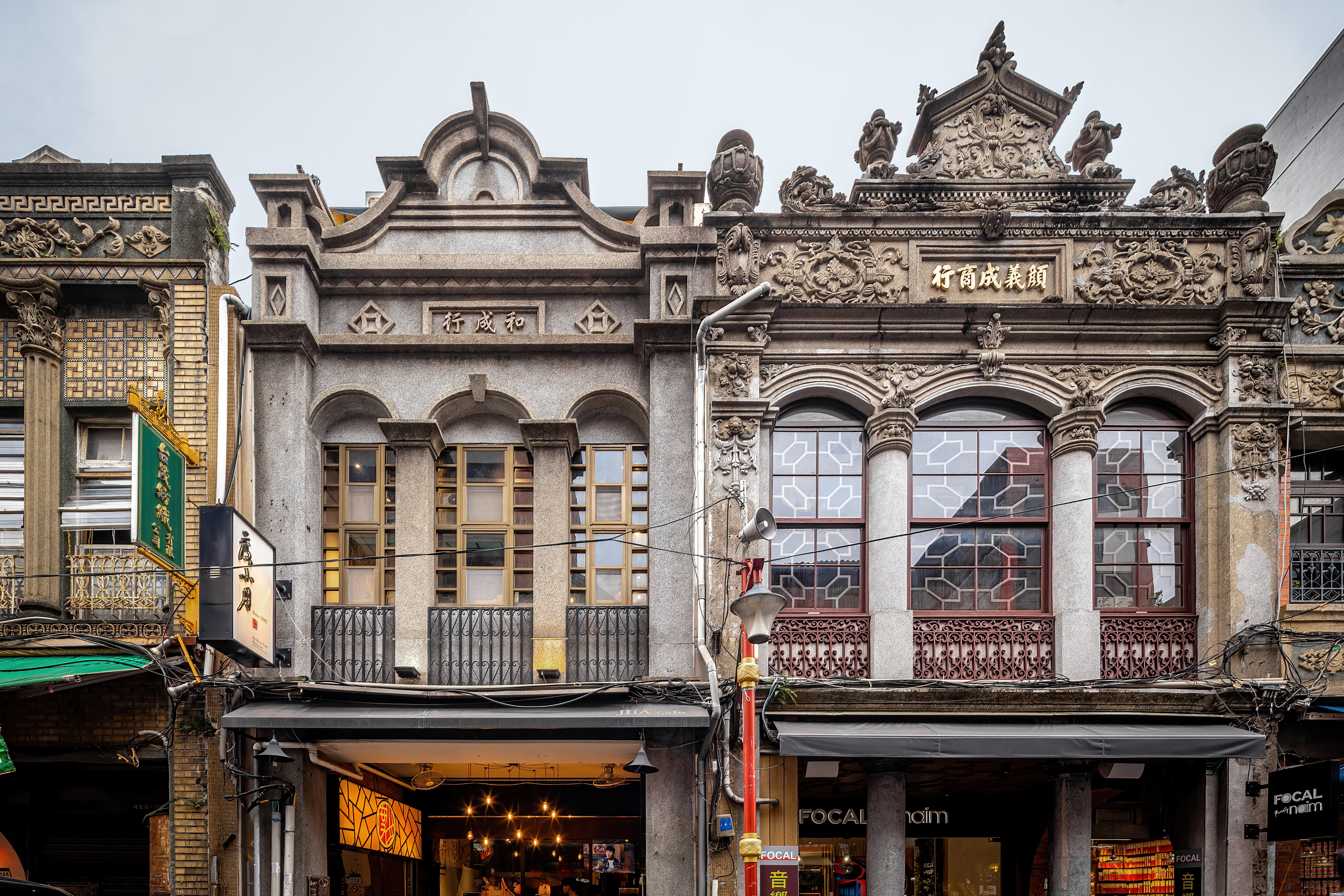
The Dihua Market has many buildings built during the Japanese colonial era.

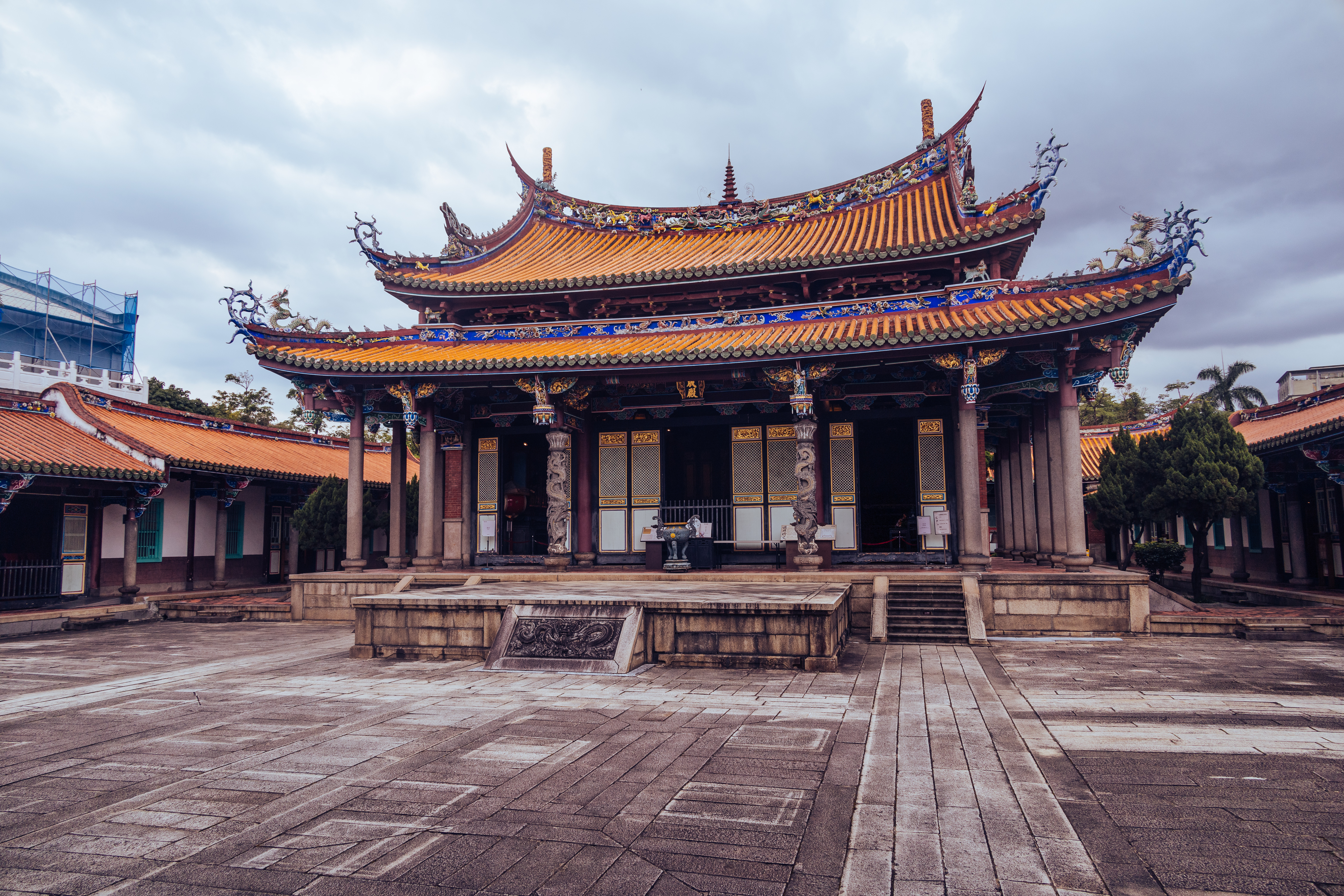
The Taipei Confucius Temple is adorned with southern Fujian-style ceramic adornments.

== History ==
During the Qing dynasty, the district was named Daronpon (Chinese: 大浪泵; Pe̍h-ōe-jī: Tōa-lông-pōng), Paronpon, and other variants, but was renamed Toaliongtong (大隆同; Toā-liông-tông) in 1844. Following the Second Opium War, a port was opened in Twatutia for international trade. Foreign trade resulted in the economic development of the district.

In 1946, the district's name was changed to Tatung (大同), which means "Great Unity", the Confucian notion of utopia which is in the lyrics of the National Anthem of the Republic of China. In 1990, the district merged with neighboring Jiancheng and Yanping Districts to create today's enlarged Datong District. The spelling became "Datong" due to switching to the Pinyin Chinese romanization system.

== Administrative divisions ==
The district consists of Bao'an, Dayou, Guangneng, Guoqing, Guoshun, Jiangong, Jianming, Jiantai, Jingxing, Laoshi, Linjiang, Longhe, Minquan, Nanfang, Penglai, Shuanglian, Siwen, Xingming, Yangya, Yanping, Yongle, Yuquan, Zhaoyang, Zhisheng and Zhongqing urban villages.

== Government institutions ==
- Ministry of Labor

== Tourism ==
Dihua Street is most notable for its Qing period and Japanese period architecture. It is also famous for street market during the Lunar New Year holidays. The market sells dried fruits, nuts, dried meats, dried seafood, snacks, and health drinks.

Other attractions in Datong include:

- Tianma Tea House
- Taiwan New Cultural Movement Memorial Hall
- Chen Tian-lai Residence
- Ama Museum
- Chiang Wei-shui Memorial Park
- Chen Dexing Ancestral Hall
- Museum of Contemporary Art Taipei
- Customs Museum
- Taipei Confucius Temple
- Bao-an Temple
- Xia Hai City God Temple
- Cisheng Temple

Also in the district are Qsquare shopping mall, Yongle Market (also on Dihua Street), Ningxia Night Market, Yansan Night Market and Dalong Night Market.

== Transportation ==
=== Metro ===
Datong is served by the following stations of the Taipei Metro:

- Shuanglian metro station
- Yuanshan metro station
- Beimen metro station
- Daqiaotou metro station
- Zhongshan metro station
- Minquan West Road metro station

=== Road ===
By road, the district is served by National Highway No. 1, Provincial Highway No. 1, and Provincial Highway No. 2.

It is also the location of the Yuanshan Bus Station and Taipei Bus Station, the largest bus terminal in the city.

=== Ferry ===
The Dadaocheng Wharf is located within the district.

== Notable natives ==
- Chiang Chia, manager of Chinese Taipei national football team (1981–1985)
- Chiang Peng-chien, chairperson of Democratic Progressive Party (1986–1987)
- Frank Hsieh, Premier of the Republic of China (2005–2006)
- Huang Tien-fu, member of Legislative Yuan (1981–1984, 1996–1999)
- Kuo Chin-fa, former singer
- Tsai Eng-meng, businessperson
- Yeh Ching-chuan, Minister of the Department of Health (2008–2009)

== See also ==
- District (Taiwan)
