= Dadaocheng =

Neighborhood in Taipei, Taiwan

Coordinates: 25°03′26″N 121°30′42″E

Twatutia/ Dadaocheng

Chinese name
- Chinese: 大稻埕
- Literal meaning: big rice-drying field
Transcriptions
Standard Mandarin
- Hanyu Pinyin: Dàdàochéng
- Bopomofo: ㄉㄚˋ ㄉㄠˋ ㄔㄥˊ
- Wade–Giles: Ta^{4}-tao^{4}-ch'eng^{2}
Southern Min
- Hokkien POJ: Tōa-tiū-tiâⁿ
- Tâi-lô: Tuā-tiū-tiânn

Japanese name
- Kyūjitai: 大稻埕
- Shinjitai: 大稲埕
Transcriptions
- Romanization: Daitōtei

Shophouses along Dihua Street
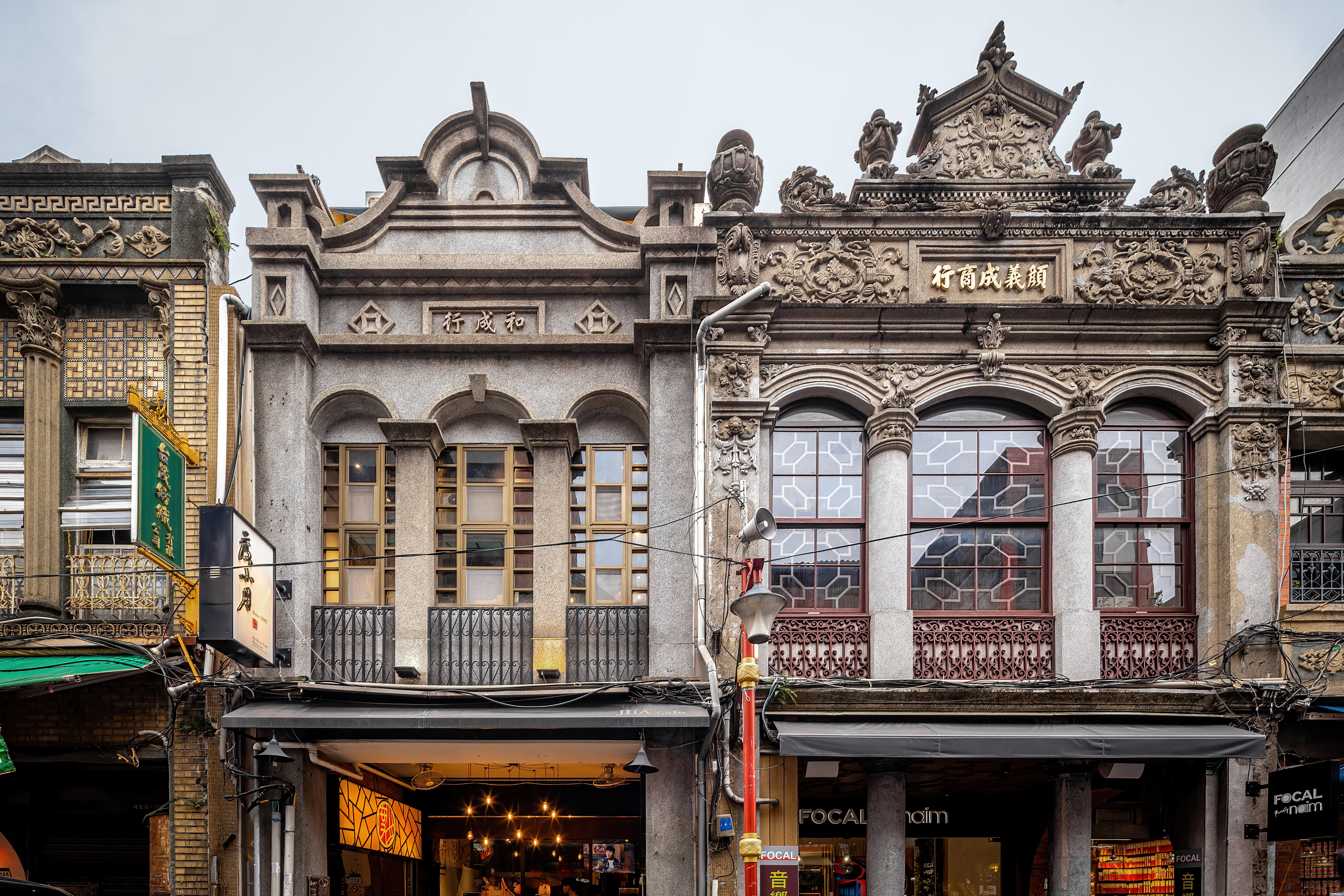
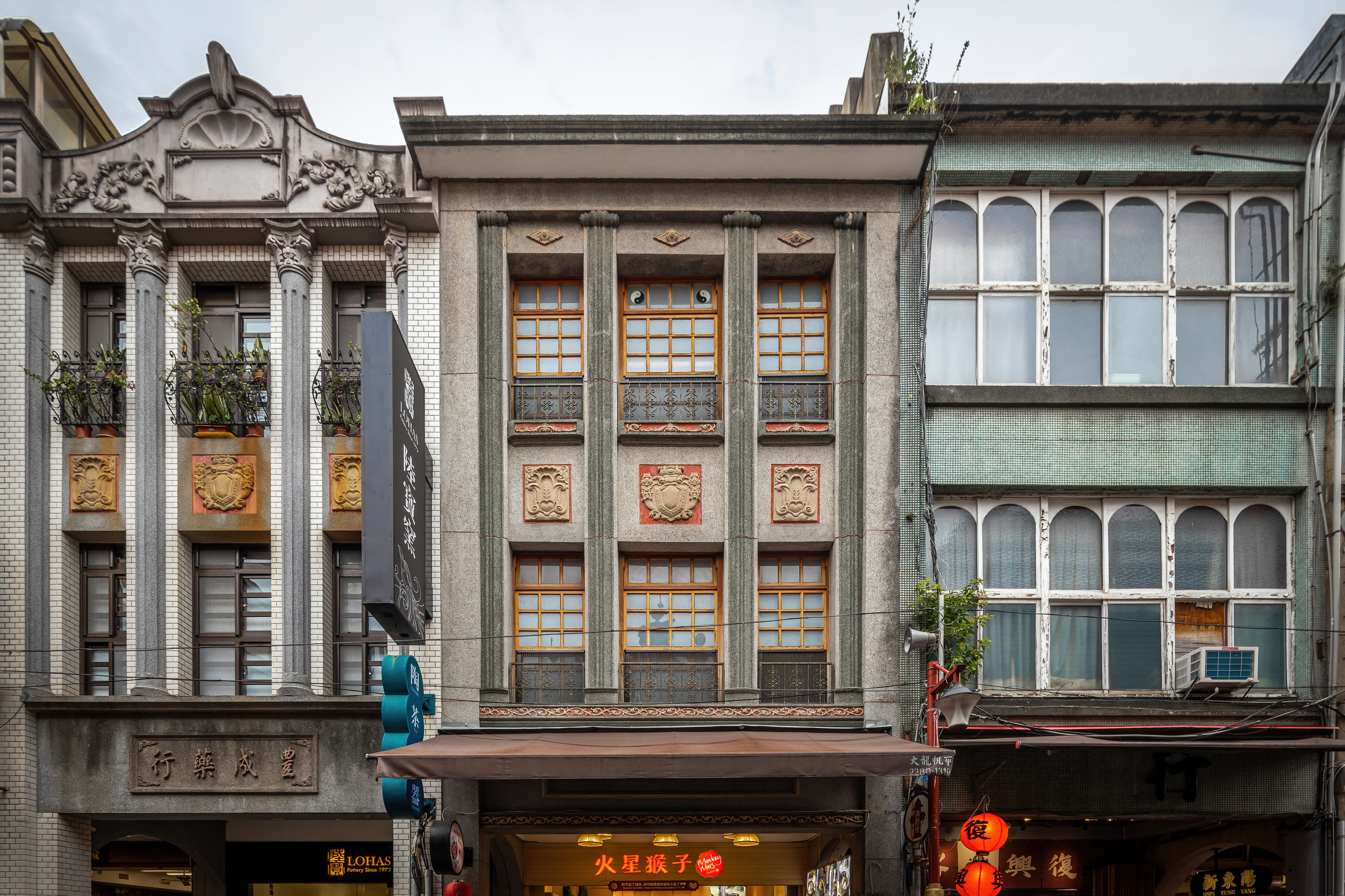
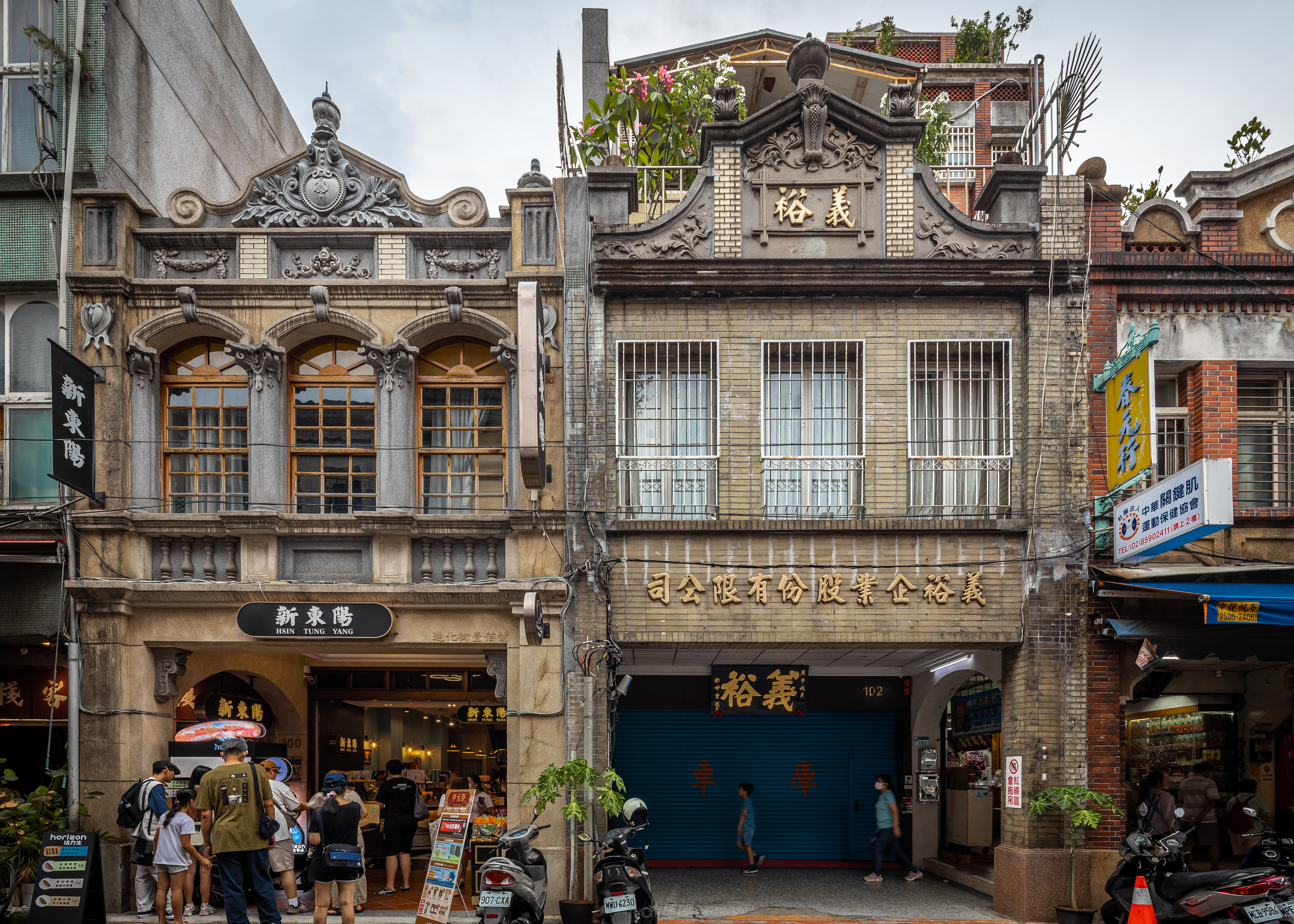

Dadaocheng is an area in Datong District, Taipei, Taiwan. It was also known as Twatutia (a transliteration of the Taiwanese Hokkien Tuā-tiū-tiânn), Daitōtei during Japanese rule, and Tataocheng (Mandarin) during the Kuomintang era.

Dadaocheng was an important trading port in the 19th century, and is still a major historical tourist attraction and shopping area. The district is known for the local Taiwanese cuisine, the Chien-Cheng Circle, and also being the center of the February 28 Incident.

== History ==
When the export of tea became important in northern Taiwan in the mid-19th century, many businessmen appeared at Twatutia. The first shop opened in 1851, belonging to Lin Lan-tian (林藍田), a native of Keelung. Lin opened three shops that he later called Lim Ek-sun (林益順). Foreigners entered the trade in 1867 and five British firms had been established at Twatutia by 1872.

In 1853, many people moved into the area from Wanhua following the Ding-Xia Jiao Conflict

The first rail station in Taipei was completed in Twatutia in October 1891, when the railway to Keelung was opened for service. The branch line from Taihoku (Taipei) to Tamsui was completed in June 1901, and Daitotei Station (Japanese: 大稻埕驛) (大稻埕車站) opened as part of the then TRA Tamsui Line. However, it was closed to passenger service in 1916 and continued to operate as a freight-only station until its eventual closure in 1937.

In the early 20th century, Daitotei was considered a part of the Taihoku area outside of the city proper, and was where European settlers lived. It stretched northward along the Tamsui River, which flows down to the port, a distance of about 10 miles (16 km). Daitotei was the second most populous city in Taiwan (second to Tainan and followed by Banka) with a population of thirty to forty thousand. In 1920, it became part of the newly incorporated Taihoku City under Taihoku Prefecture.

Daitotei was the location for one of the first movie theaters built for the Taiwanese audience during Japanese rule. The interior structure of Eraku-za imitated the Imperial Theater in Tokyo and included a café, a gymnasium and dressing rooms. Also, during the Japanese rule it was used as one of the sites for The Taiwan Exposition: In Commemoration of the First Forty Years of Colonial Rule.

The most famous street in Dadaocheng was named Dihua Street after World War II and is the oldest street in Taipei. There are many stores selling dried goods and snacks, especially before the Lunar New Year. Taipei Xia-Hai City God Temple (大稻埕霞海城隍廟) is also on Dihua Street. There is a festival to celebrate the birthday of Xiahai Cheng Huang (City God) on the 13th day of the 5th lunar month every year.

== See also ==
- List of roads in Taiwan
- List of tourist attractions in Taiwan
- Bopiliao
