= Taipei Grand Trail =

Long-distance trail in Taiwan

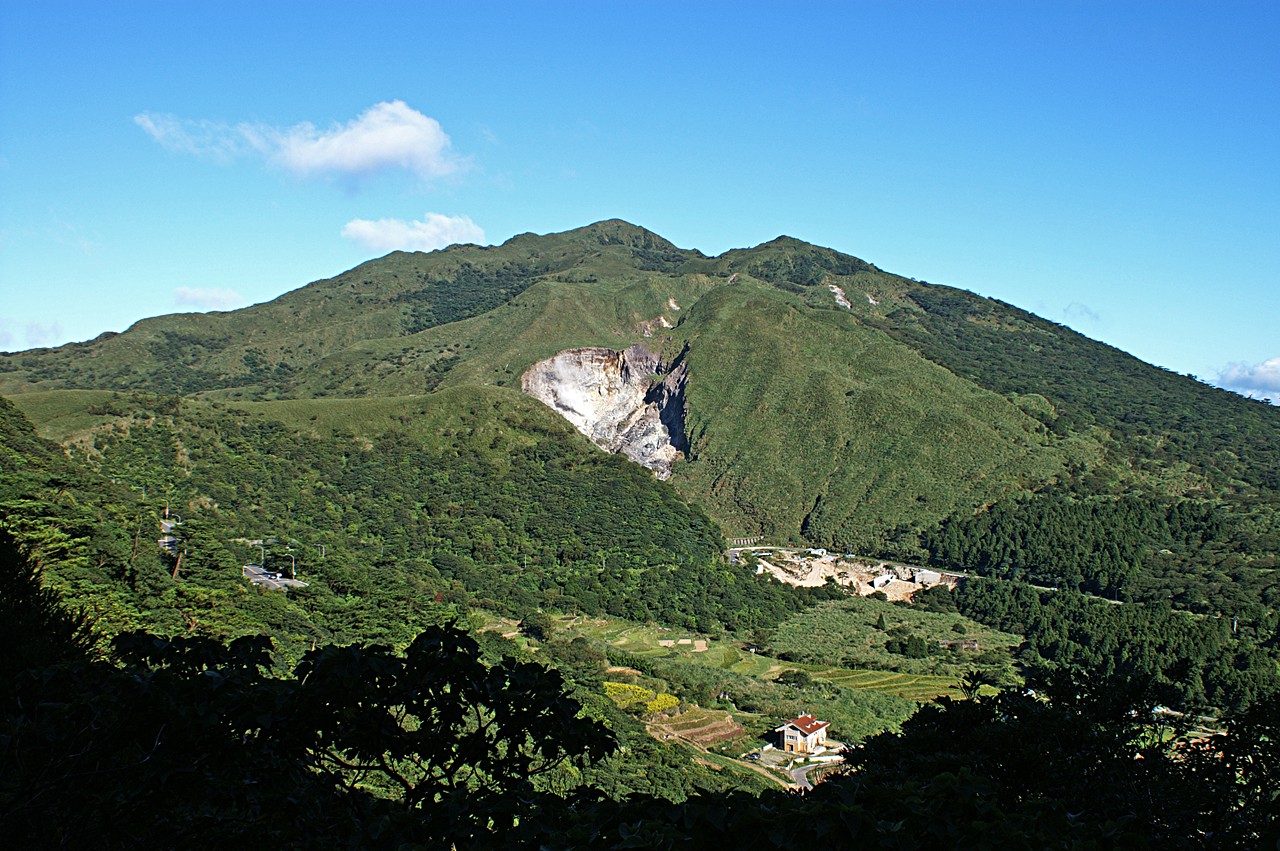
- Qixing Mountain (七星山), located in the second and third sections of the Taipei Grand Trail
- Length: 130 km
- Location: Taipei, Taiwan
- Began construction: 2017
- Completed: 2018
- Use: Hiking; cycling
- Elevation gain/loss: 1,120 meters
- Highest point: 1,120 meters (Seven Star Peak)
- Difficulty: Easy; medium; high
- Season: Year-round
- Sights: Datun Mountain; Qixing Mountain; Zhinan Temple; Maokong; Taipei Zoo; Dadaocheng; Bailing Sport Park
- Surface: Natural; gravel; asphalt
- Maintainer: Taipei City Government
- Website: Official website

The Taipei Grand Trail is a long-distance trail located in Taipei, Taiwan, combining hiking trails and bicycle paths. It is 130 kilometers long and has an elevation difference of nearly 1,120 meters. The entire route is divided into eight sections, of which 1–7 are green belts (mainly mountain trails), and section 8 and its extensions are "blue belts" (mainly riverside bicycle paths). One-third of the green belt route passes through Yangmingshan National Park and includes the Tatun Volcanic Group, Qixing Mountain (the highest peak in Taipei), the Zhuzihu Flower Sea, the Shuangxigou Historic Trail, as well as the Bishan campsite, the Baishihu Suspension Bridge, the "Jiantanshan Old Place" viewing platform, and the Maokong Tea Garden.

== History ==
In 2017, the Geotechnical Engineering Office of the Public Works Bureau of the Taipei City Government began investigating the mountain trails under its jurisdiction in order to improve the quality of leisure and recreation and build a trail tourism industry. This led to the creation of the Taipei Grand Trail, which connected mountain ridges, ancient trails, mountain paths, and urban roads. The entire network measured about 92 kilometers, divided into seven sections. It was inaugurated on 17 September 2018. In 2021, an eighth section was added, connecting the Taipei Grand Trail to the existing Riverside Park Bikeway, which had been completed in 2011. The section passes by the Jingmei, Xindian, and Tamsui rivers, and the riverside parks along the way, and includes an optional extension. This turned the multiuse trail network into a 130-kilometer loop.

== Section details ==
Section	Start	Attractions	End	Route length/required time
1	Guandu metro station		Erziping	Approximately 13 kilometers / 7–8 hours
2	Tianping Pavilion	Datun Mountain	Xiaoyoukeng Service Station	Approximately 12 kilometers / 6–7 hours
3	Xiaoyoukeng Service Station	Qixing Mountain; Milk Lake	Fengguizui	Approximately 13 kilometers / 7–8 hours
4	Fengguizui		Dahu Park metro station / CUST – optional segment	Approximately 10 kilometers / Approximately 18 kilometers / 7–8 hours (including transportation) – optional segment
5	Jiantan metro station		Bishan Rock Kaizhang Shengwang Temple	Approximately 12 kilometers / 6–7 hours
6	CUST		Linguang metro station	Approximately 11 kilometers / 5–6 hours
7	World Mountain Villa (section point) / National Chengchi University (actual starting point)	Zhinan Temple; Maokong	Flying Dragon Trail behind Chengchi University	Approximately 13 kilometers / 5–6 hours (including transportation) / Approximately 9 kilometers
8	Taipei Zoo station	Taipei Zoo; Dadaocheng; Machangding Memorial Park; Guandu Nature Park	Guandu metro station	Approximately 38 kilometers / 4–5 hours (cycling time)
Extension	Jiantan metro station	Bailing Sport Park	Guandu metro station	The extension connects the fifth section with the eighth section.

== Gallery ==
Section 1 (Guandu metro station – Erziping)

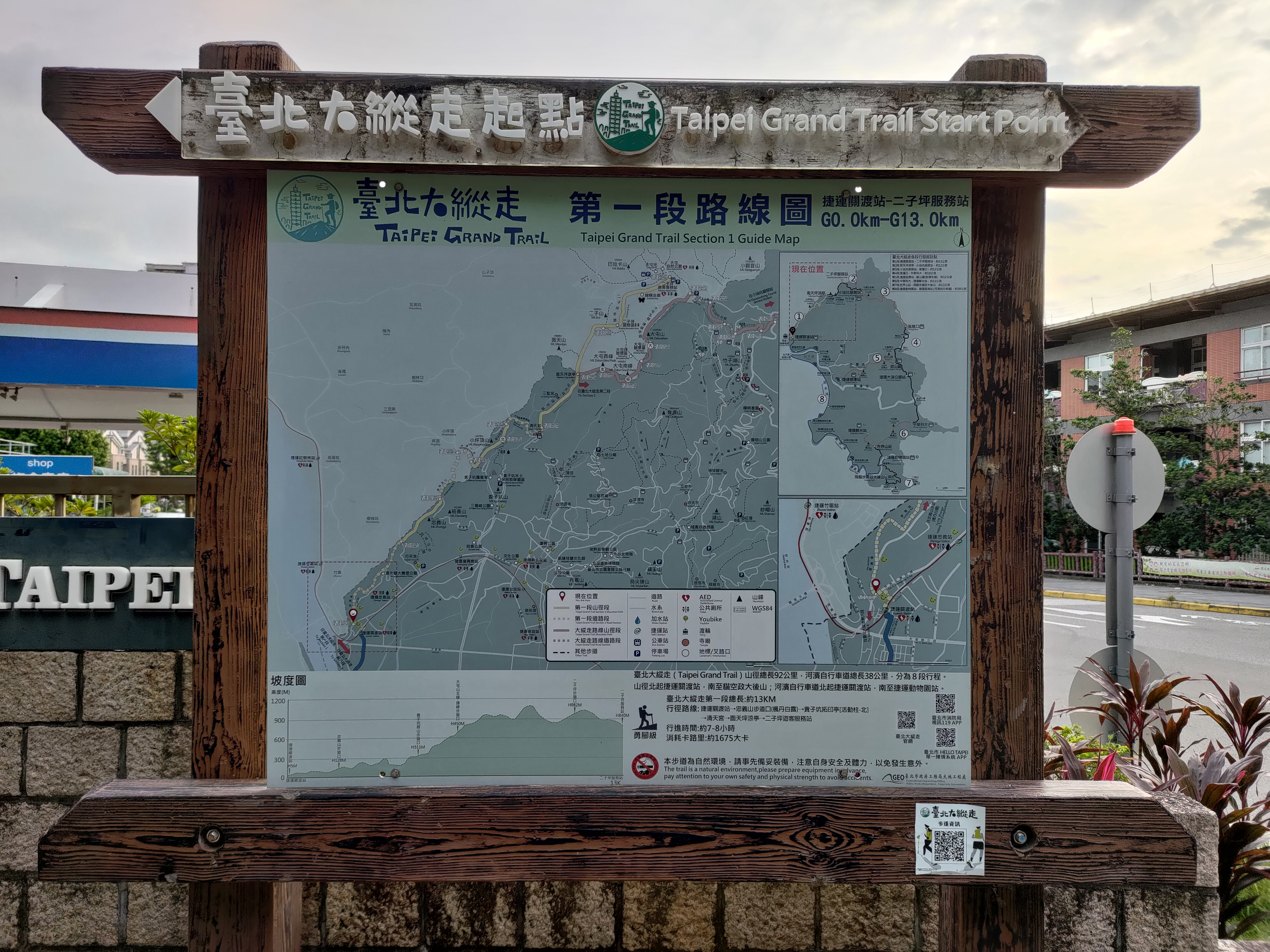
Taipei Grand Trail starting point guide sign

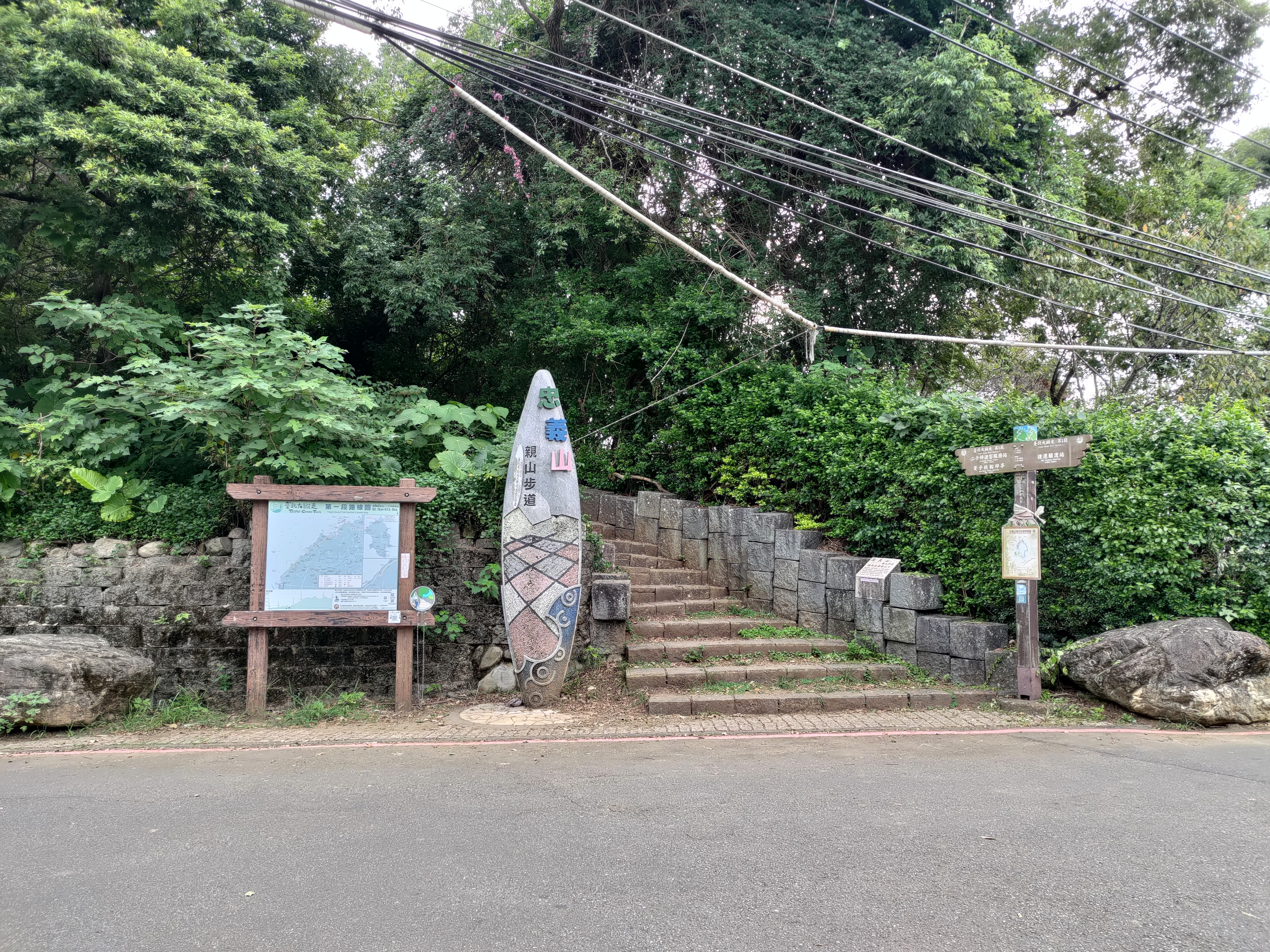
Zhongyi Mountain Trail entrance

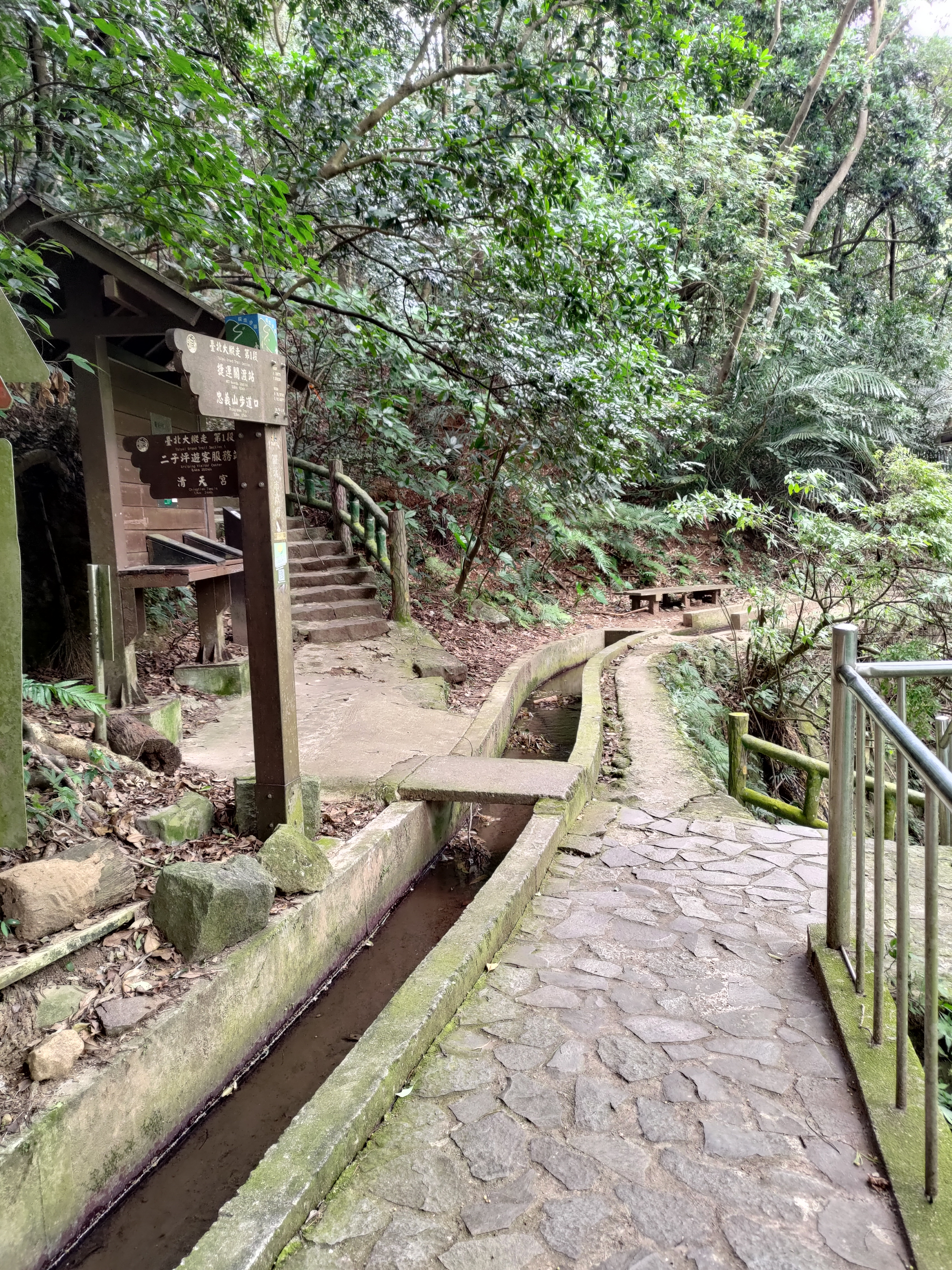
Guizikeng Mountain Trail

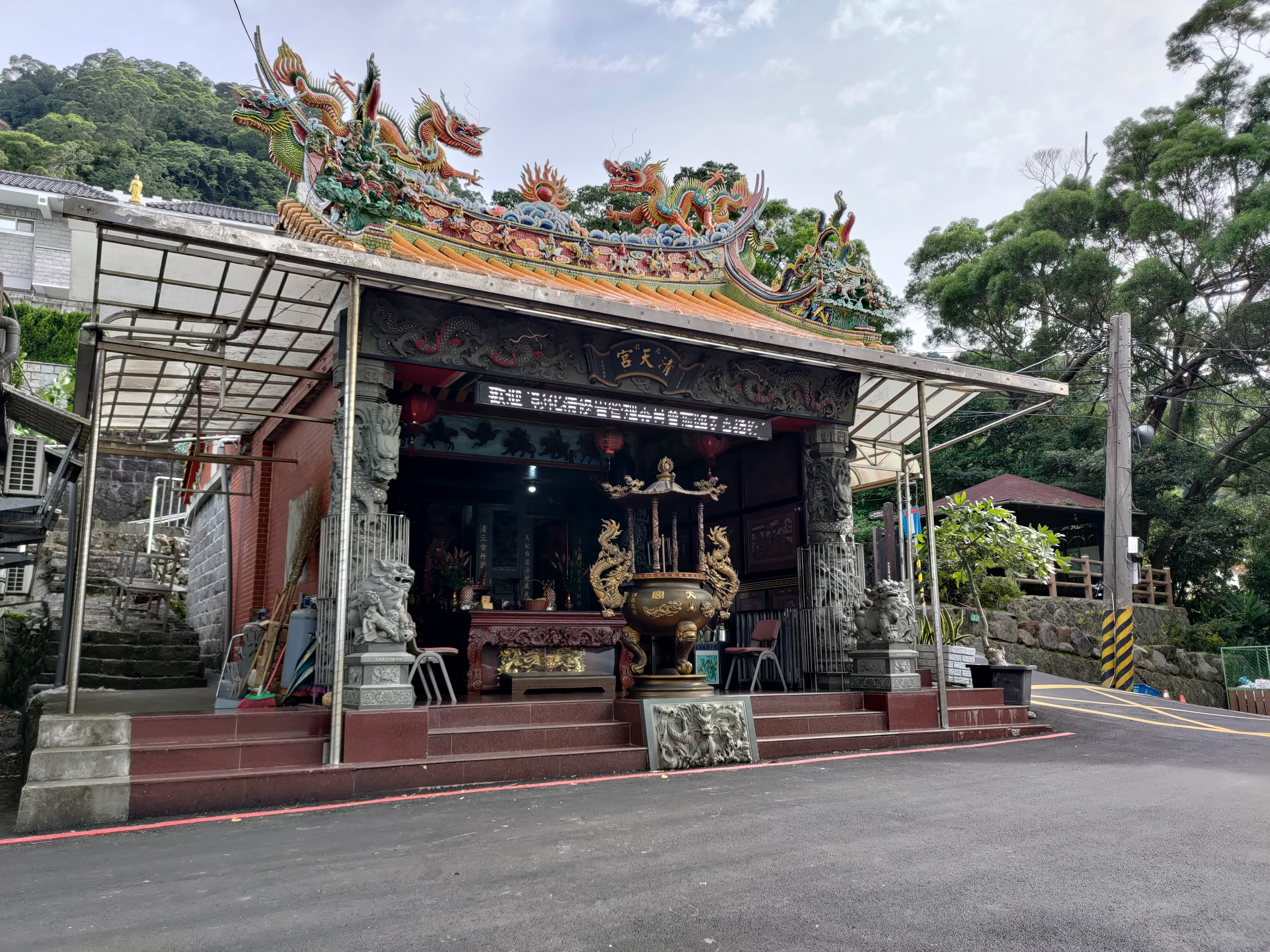
Qingtian Palace

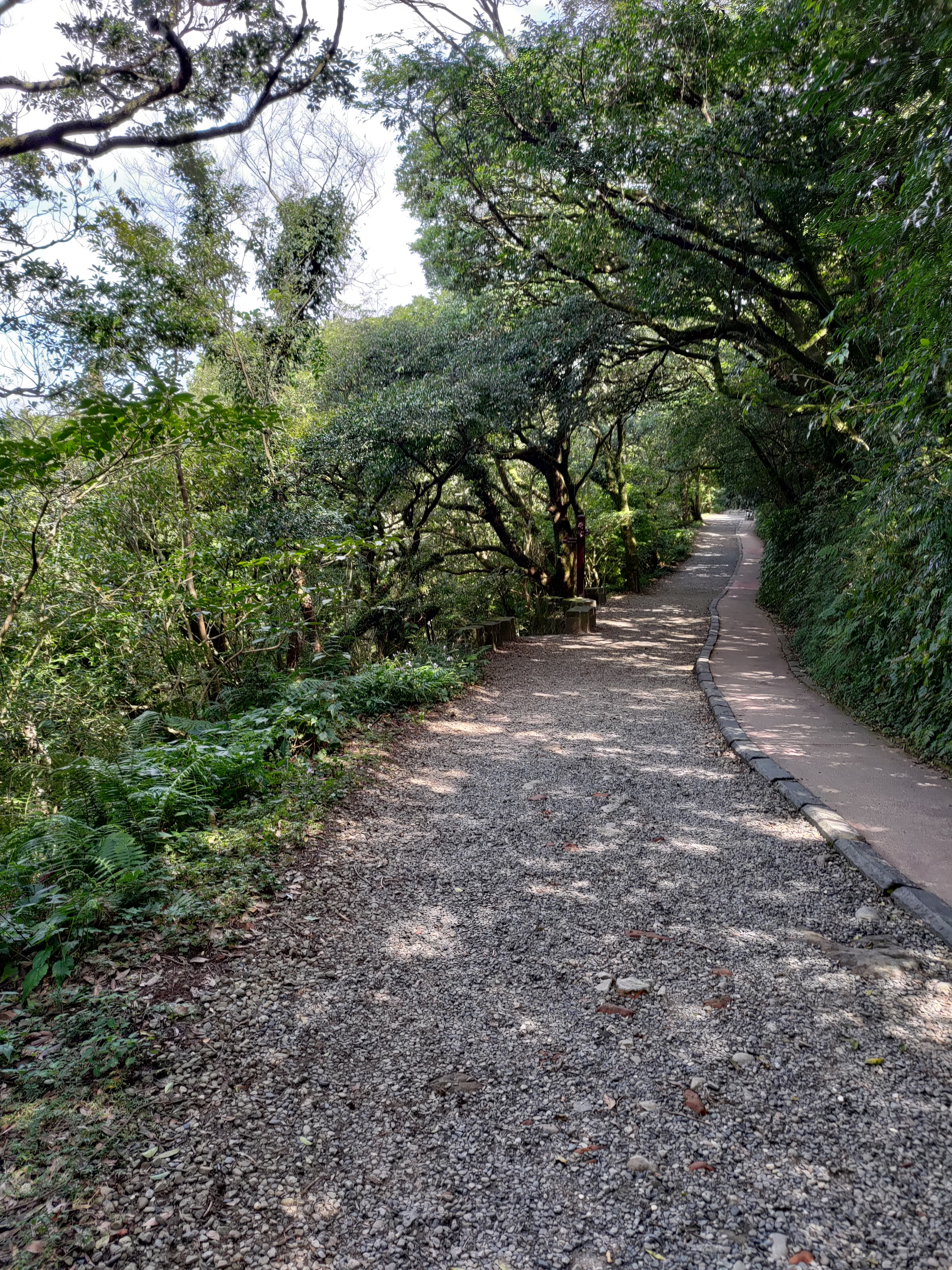
Erziping

Section 2 (Tianping Pavilion – Xiaoyoukeng)

Miantianshan

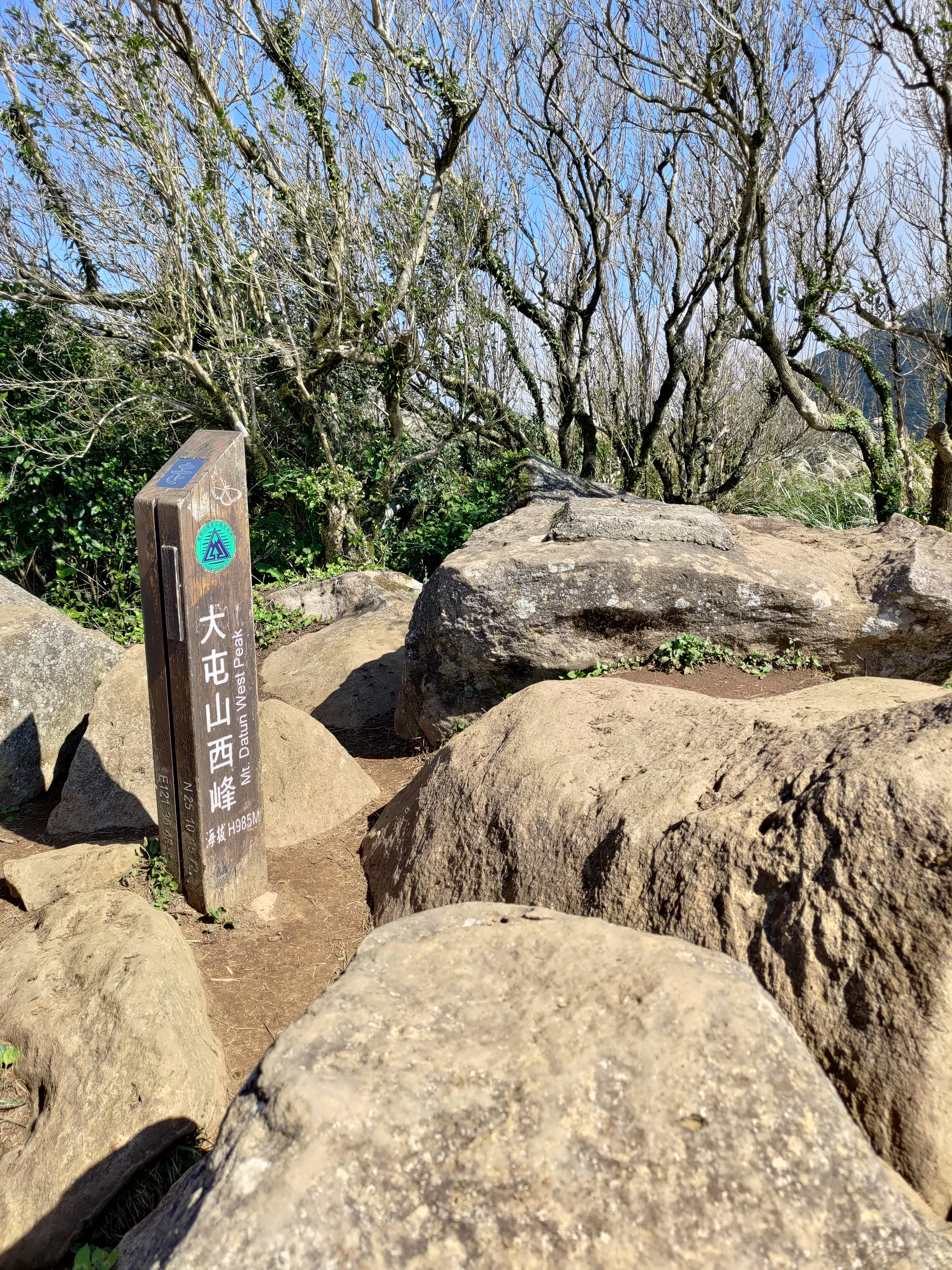
West peak of Datun Mountain

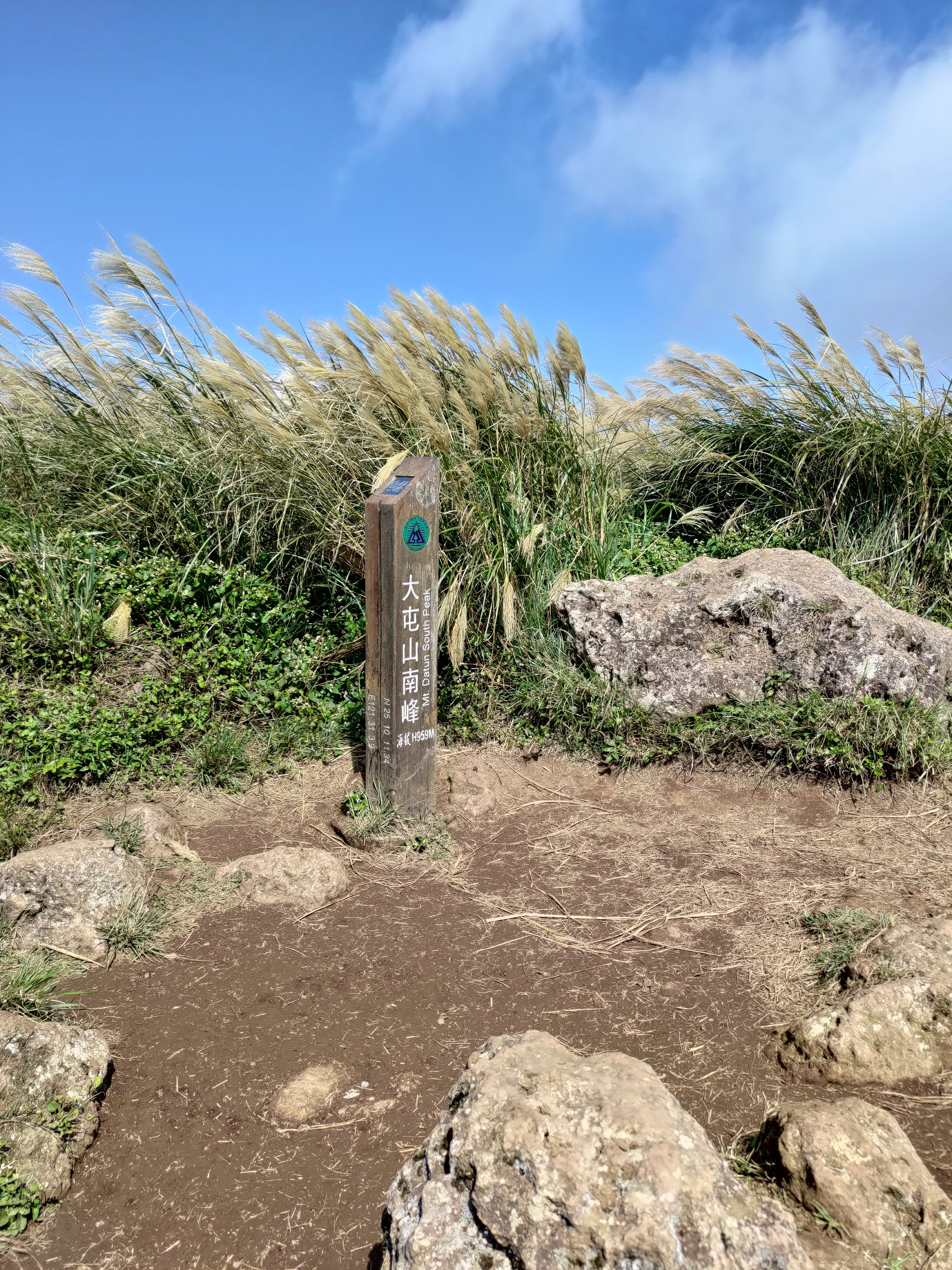
South peak of Datun Mountain

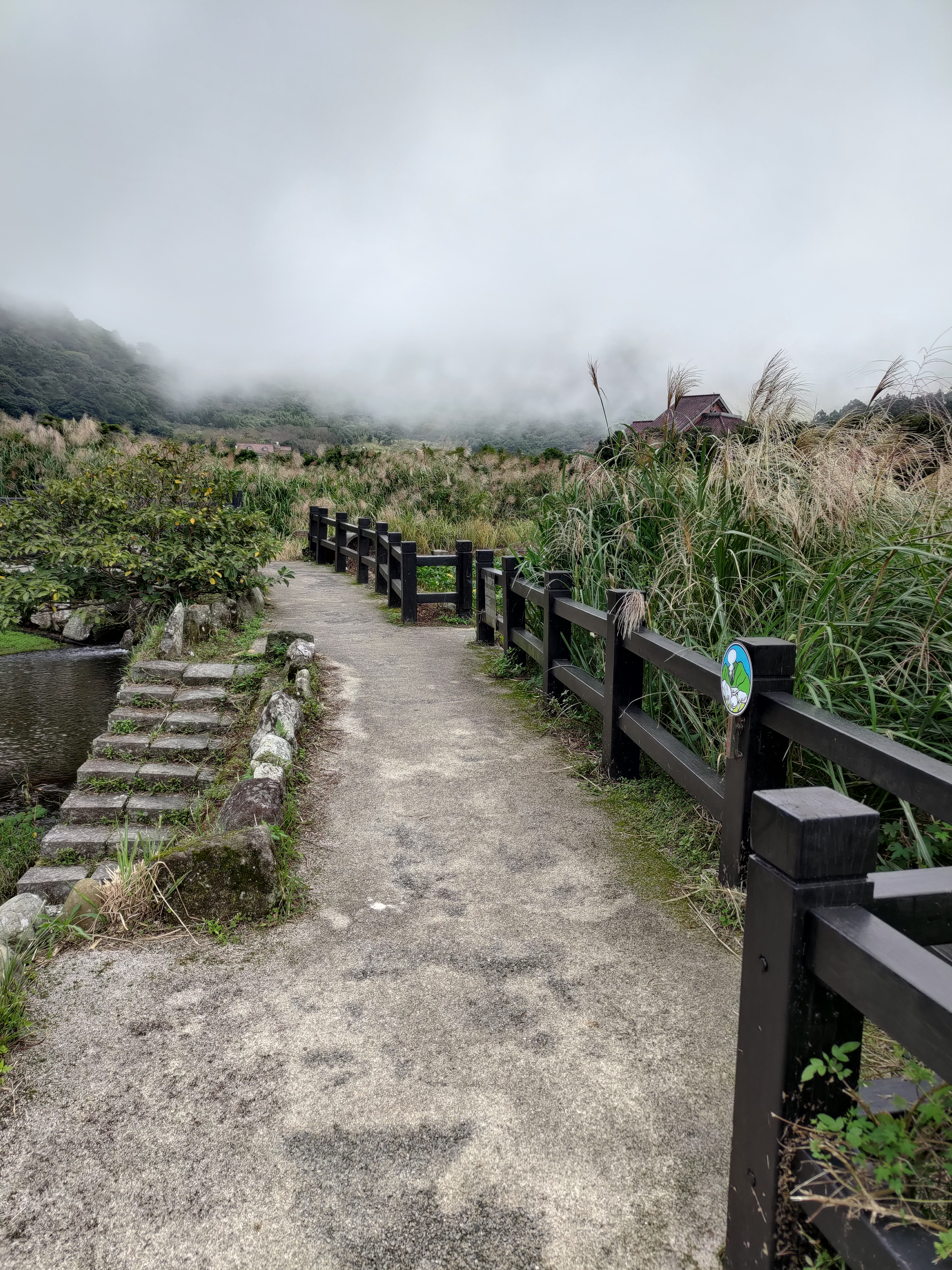
Dinghu Calla Lily Trail

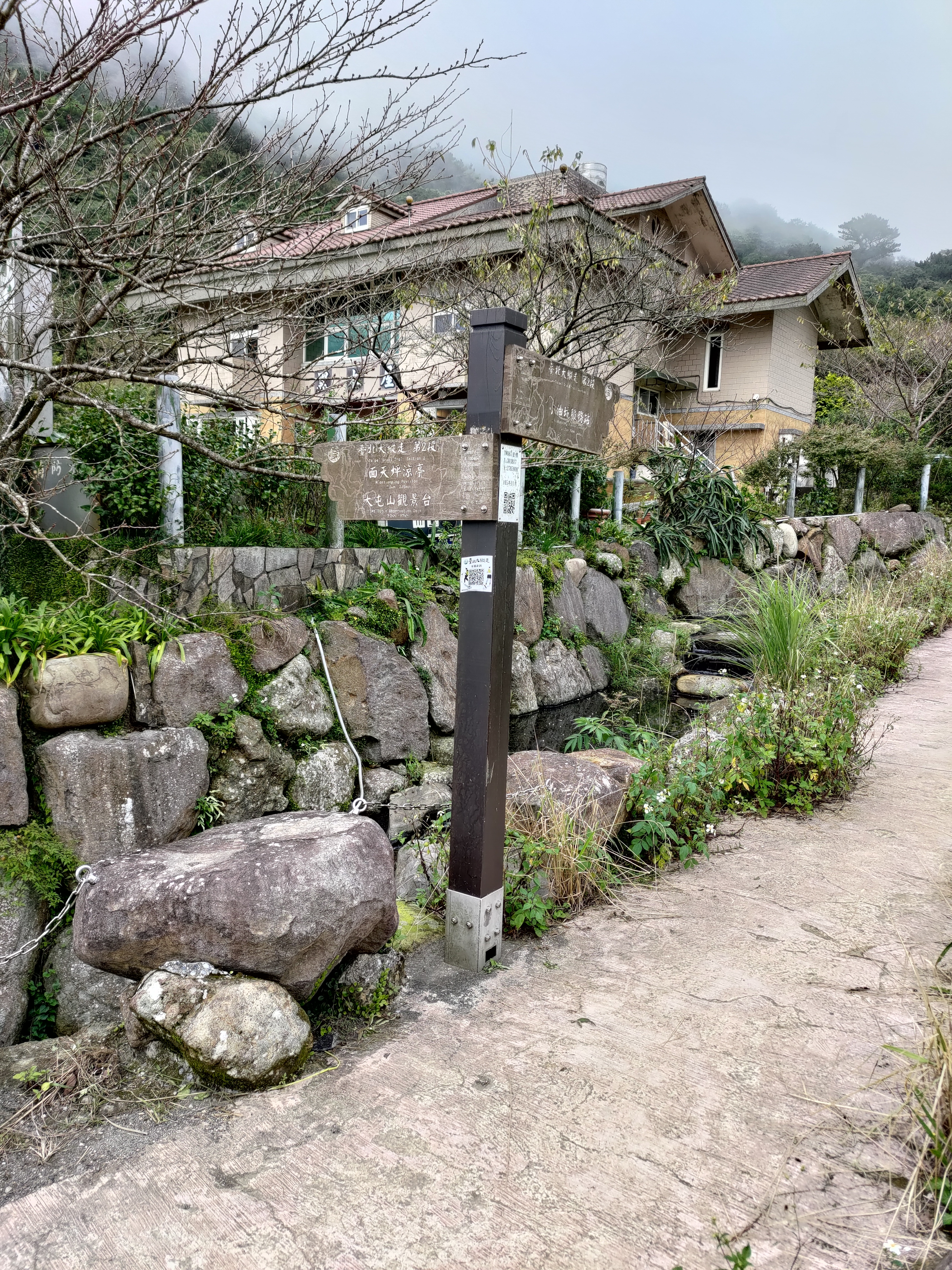
Yangmingxi Riverside Trail entrance

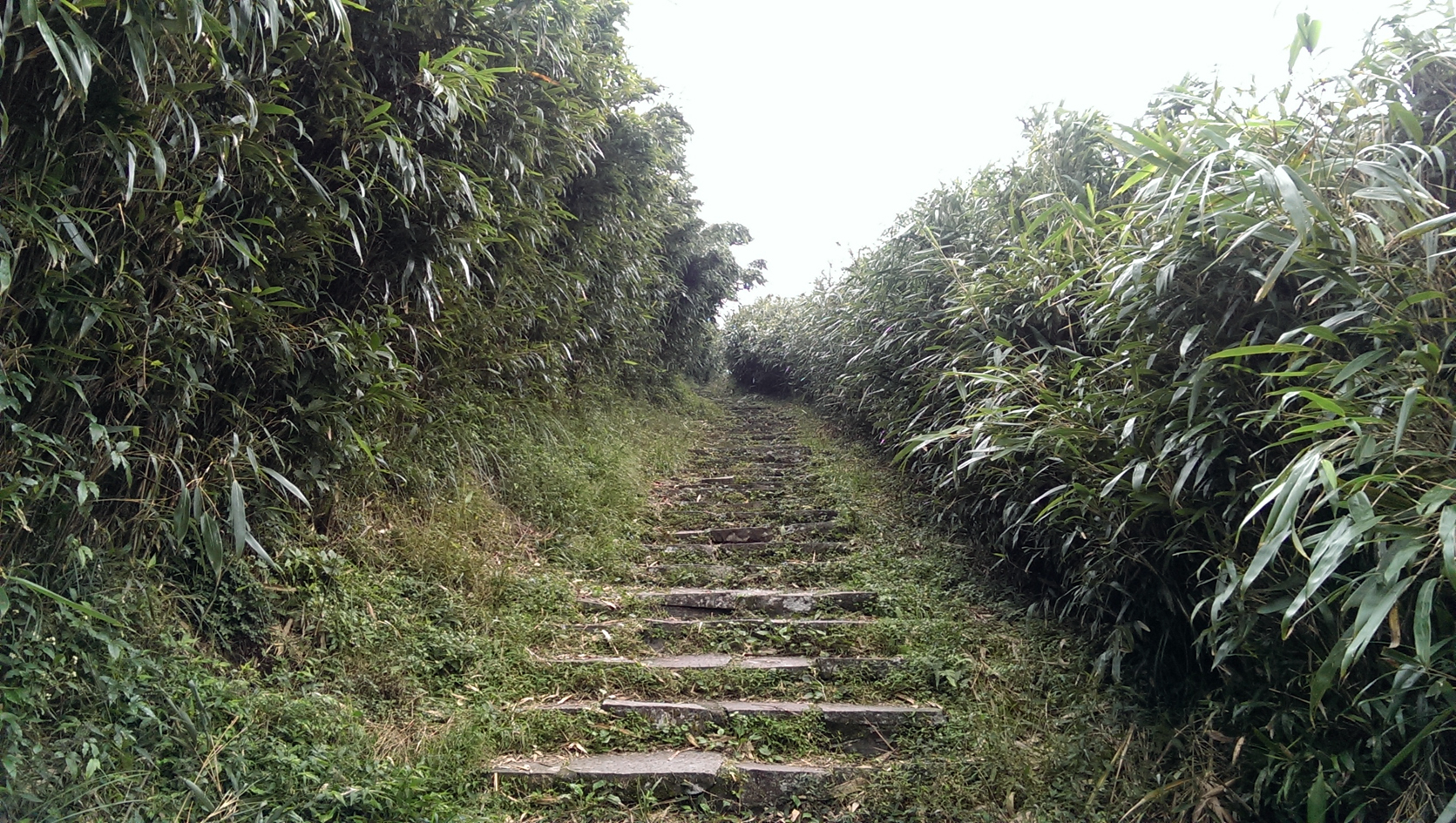
Xiaoyoukeng Arrow Bamboo Forest Trail

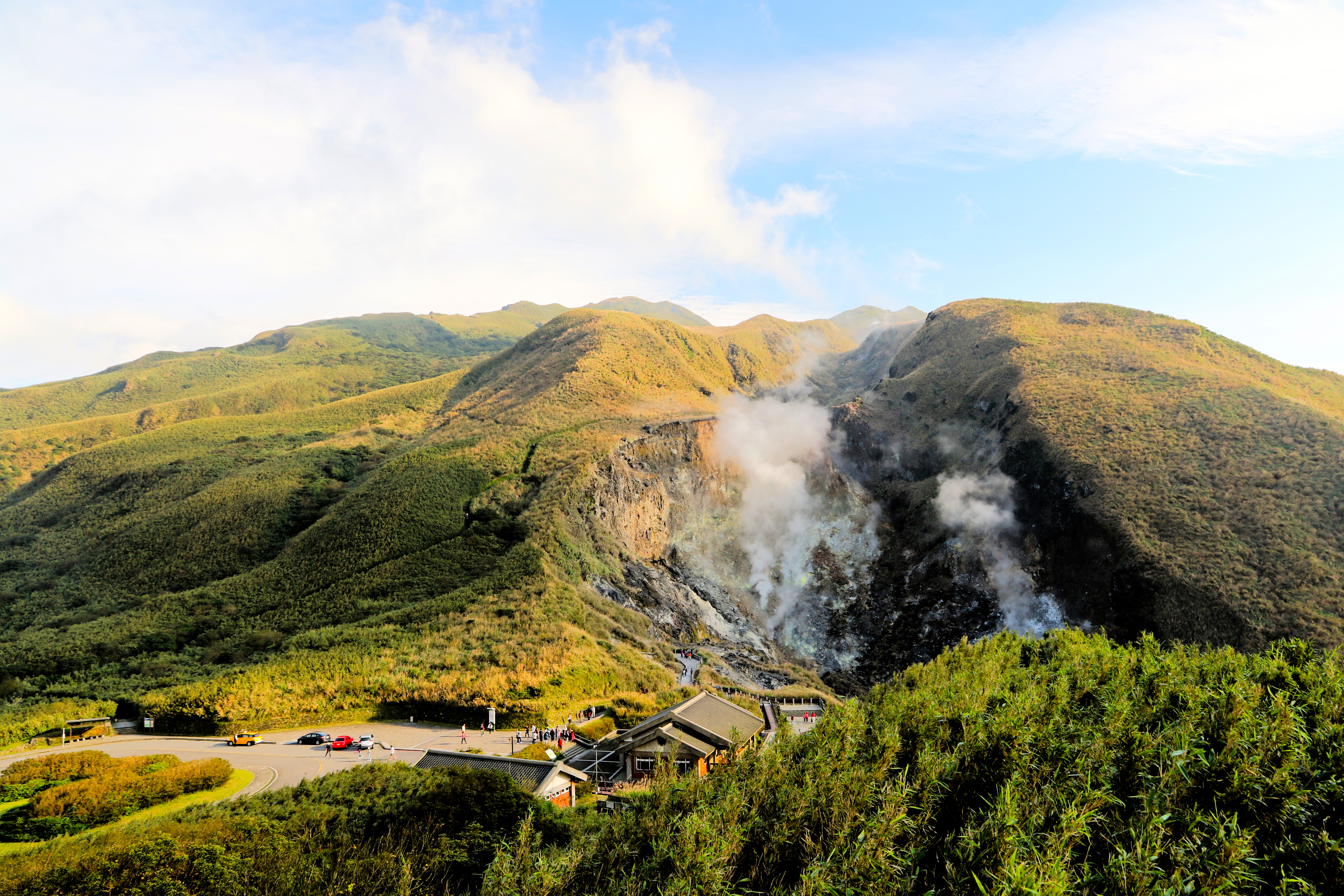
Xiaoyoukeng and visitor service station

Section 3 (Xiaoyoukeng – Fengguizui)

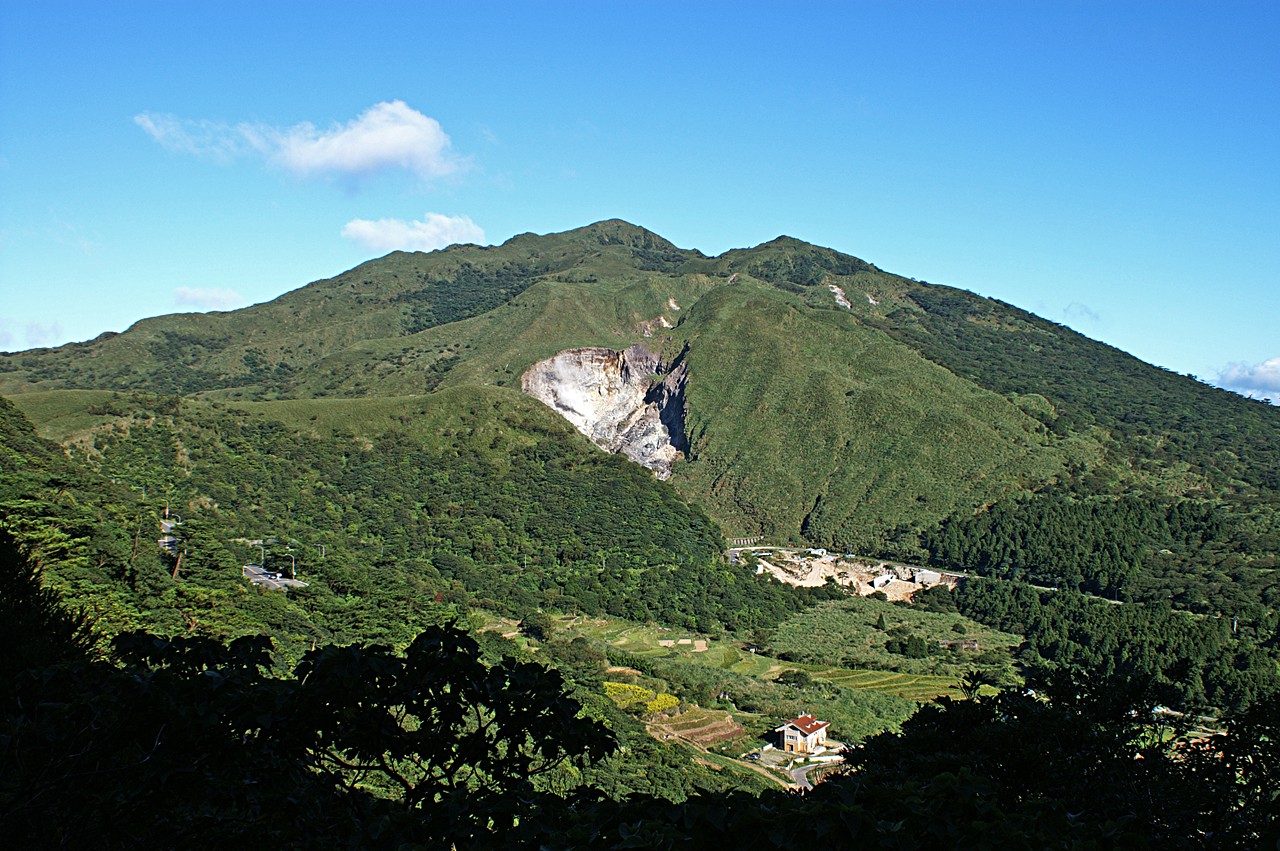
Qixing Mountain and Xiaoyoukeng, seen from the Bailaka Highway

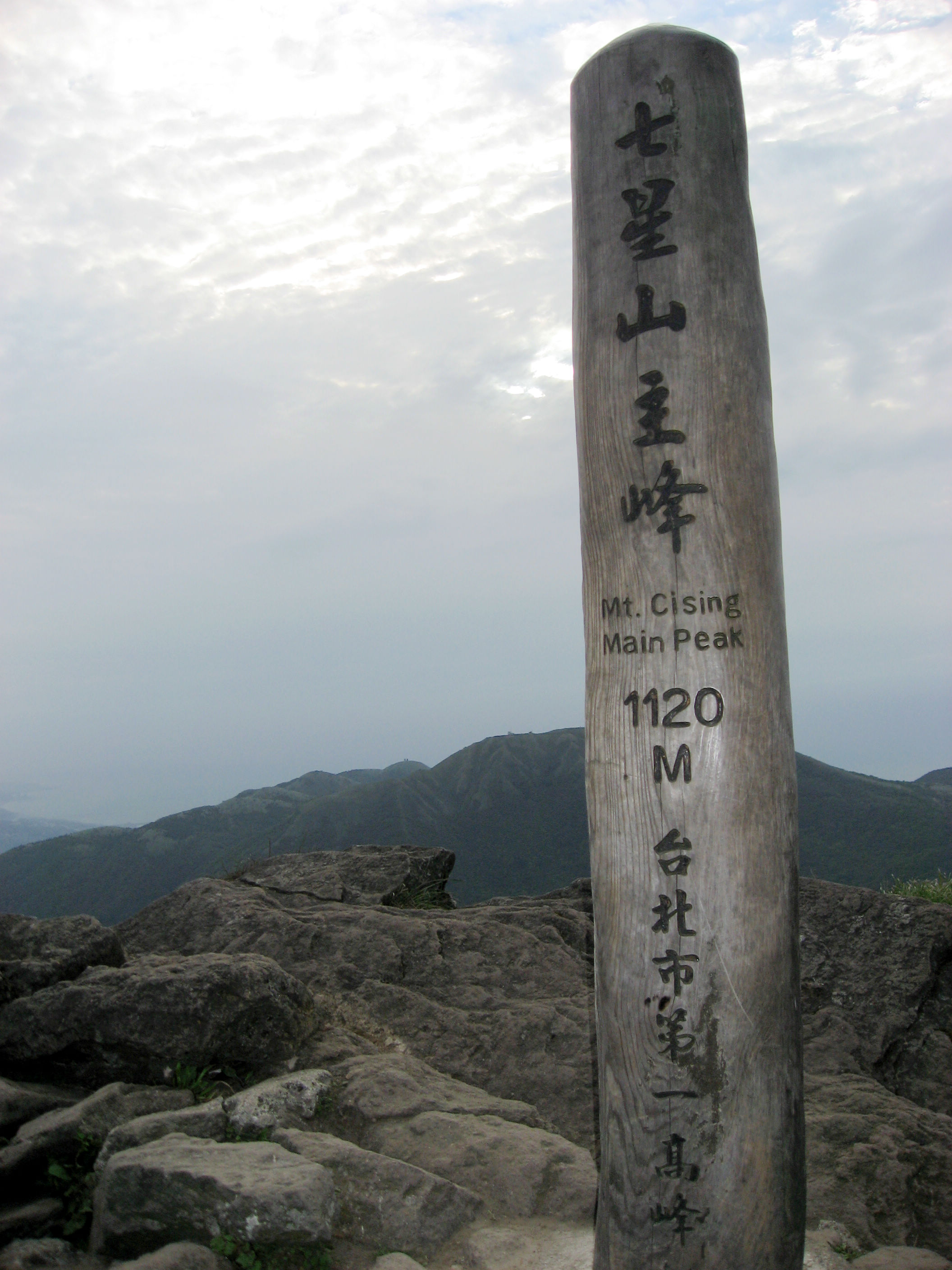
The Qixing Mountain monument is the highest point on the entire trail and also the highest point in Taipei City.

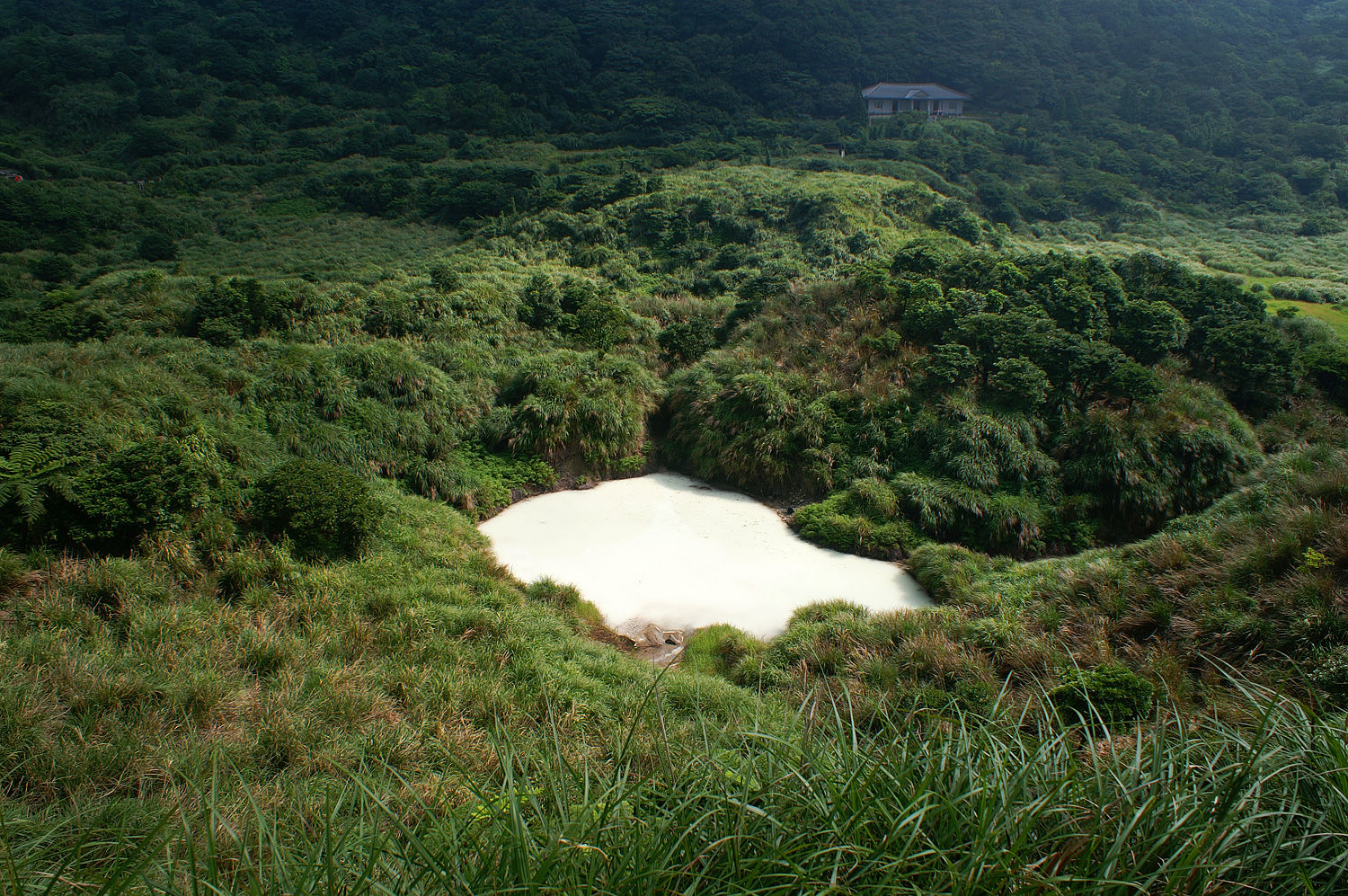
Milk Lake has a high concentration of sulfurous gases.

Section 4 (Fengguizui – Dahu Park metro station / CUST)

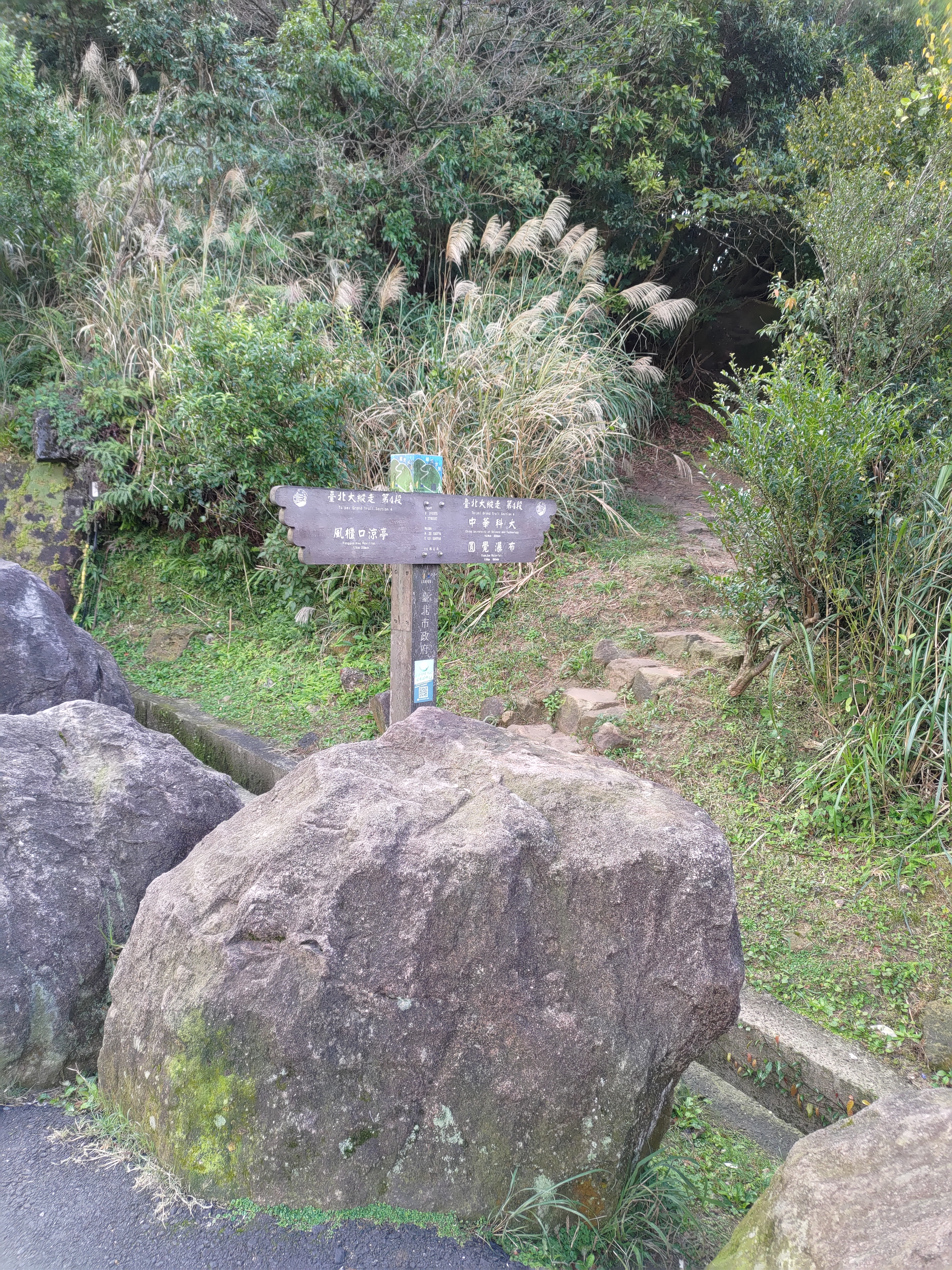
Entrance to Shuangxigou Ancient Trail (Wanxi Industrial Road)

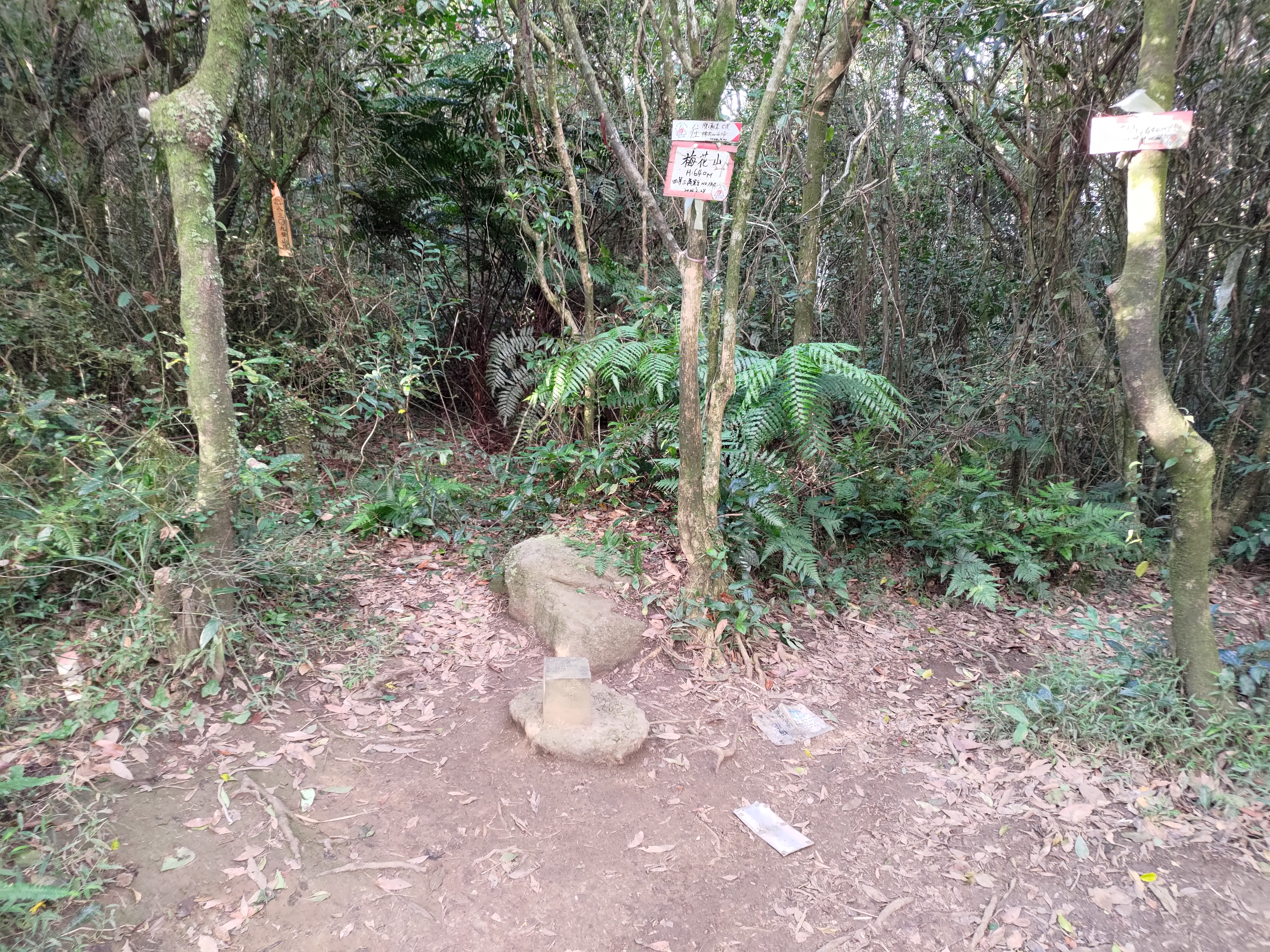
Meihuashan Triangle Point

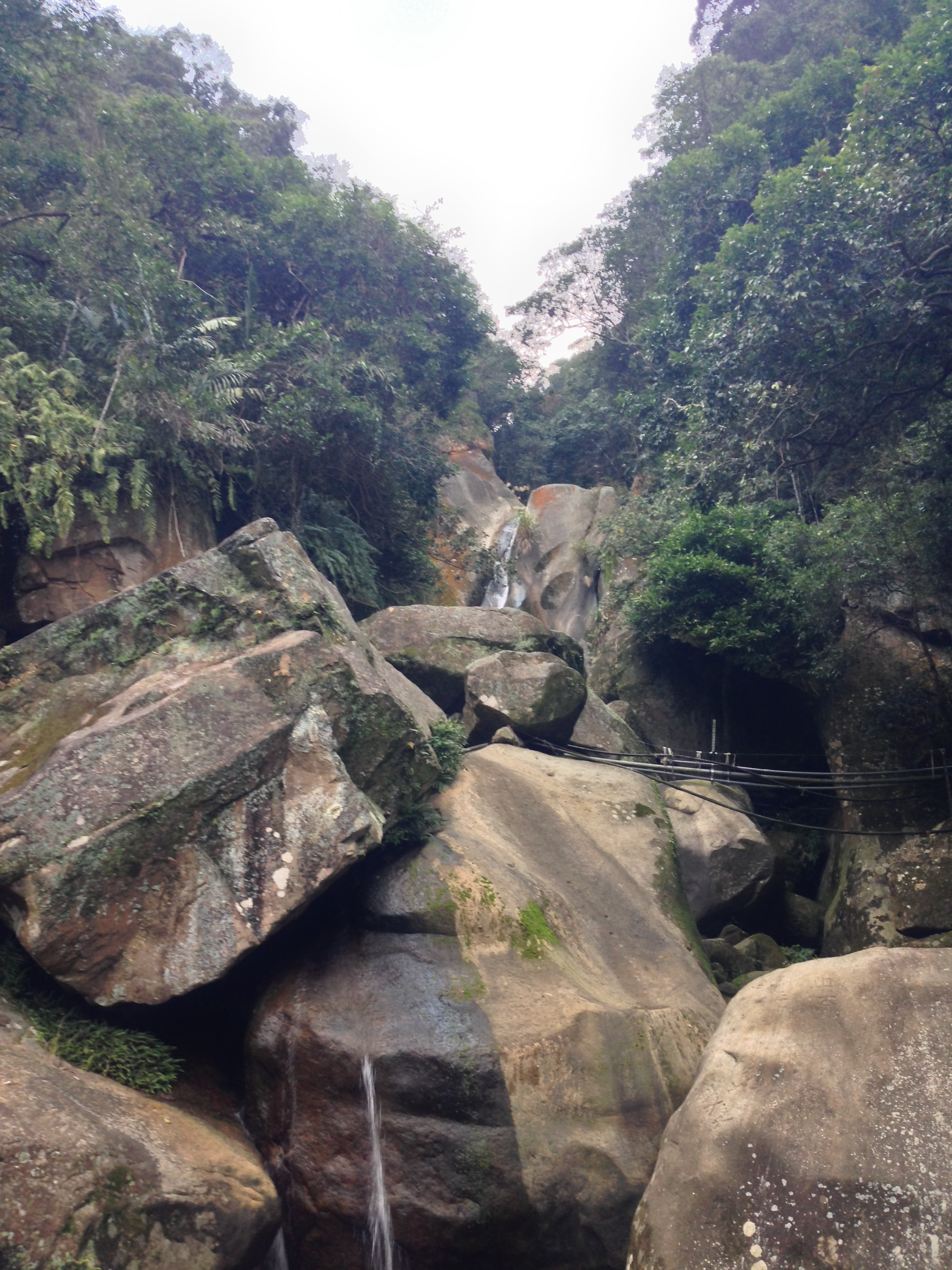
Yuanjue Waterfall

Section 5 (Jiantan metro station – Bishan Rock Kaizhang Shengwang Temple)

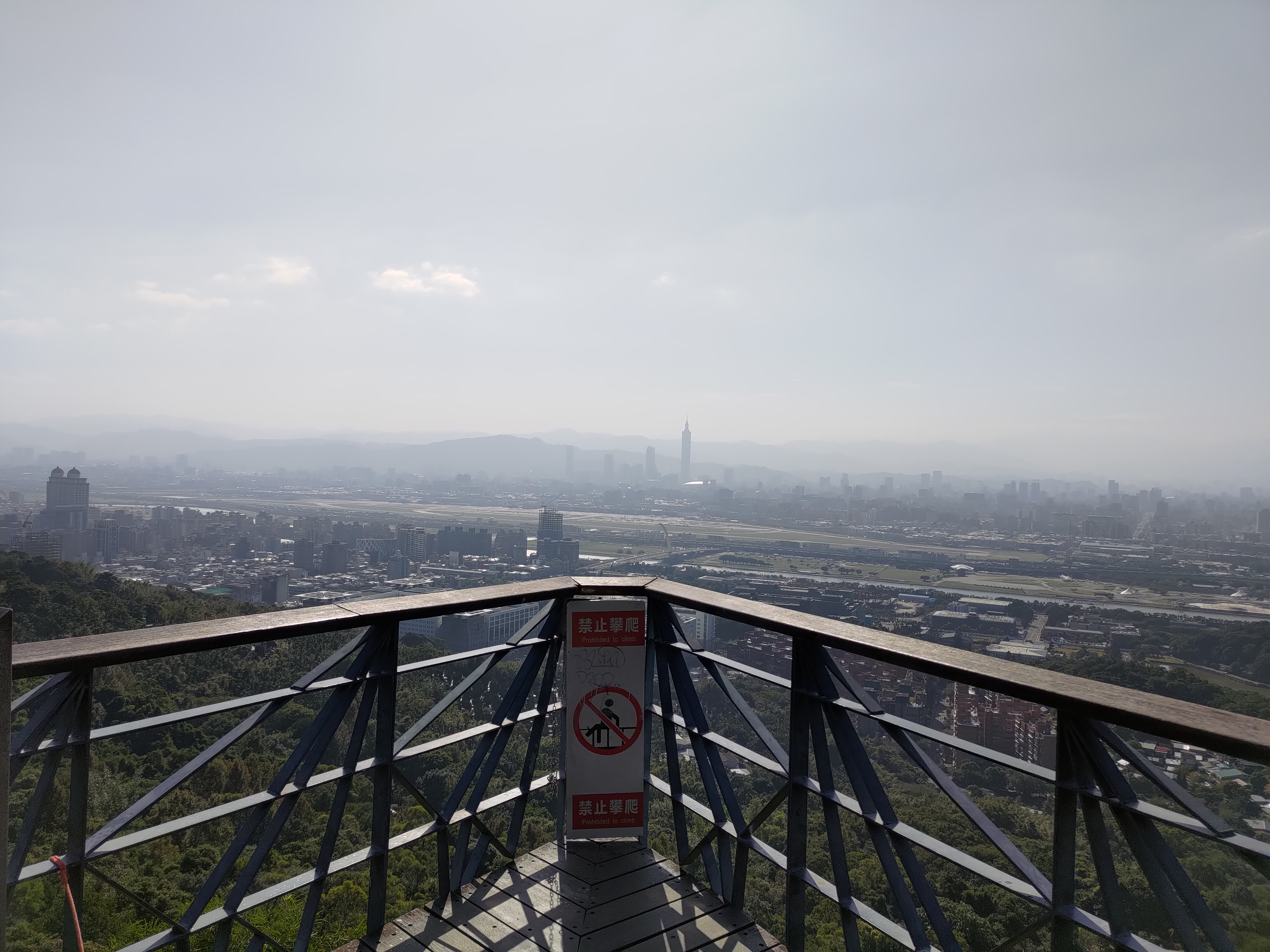
The old observation deck offers a distant view of Songshan Airport and Taipei 101.

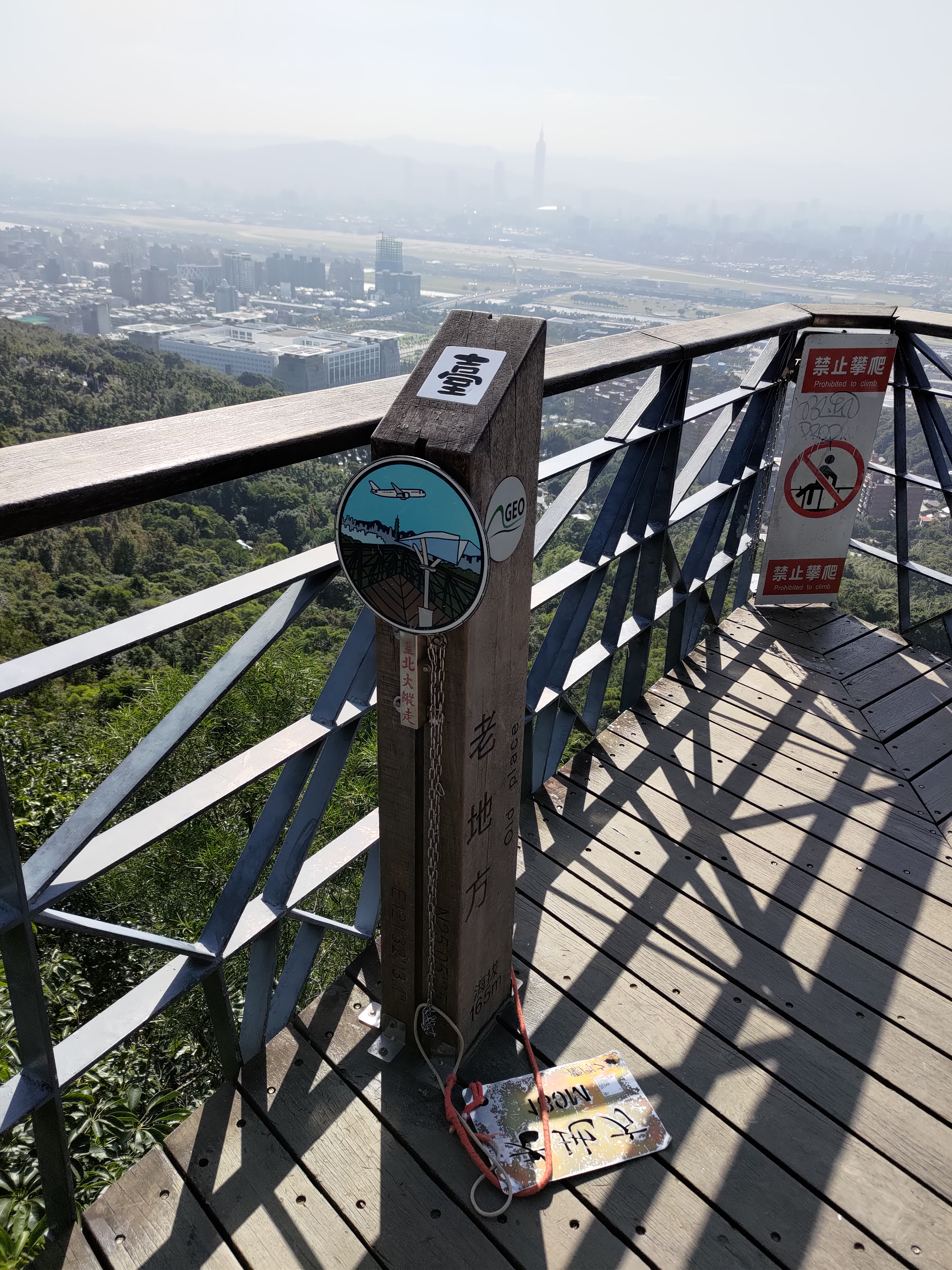
The old observation deck with the "Taiwan" sign

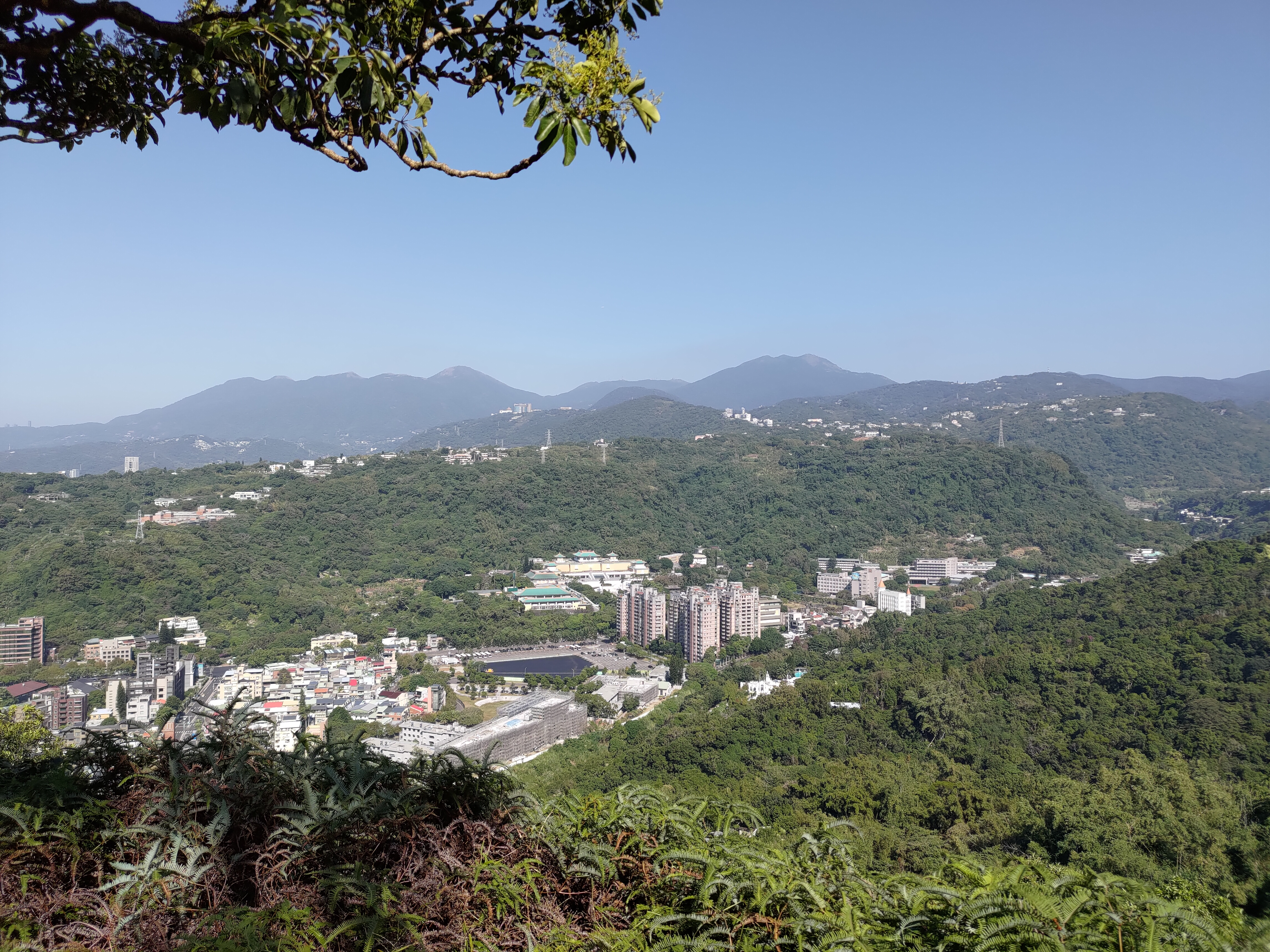
The viewpoints along the Wenjianshan Trail offer a distant view of the National Palace Museum.

Section 6 (CUST – Linguang metro station)

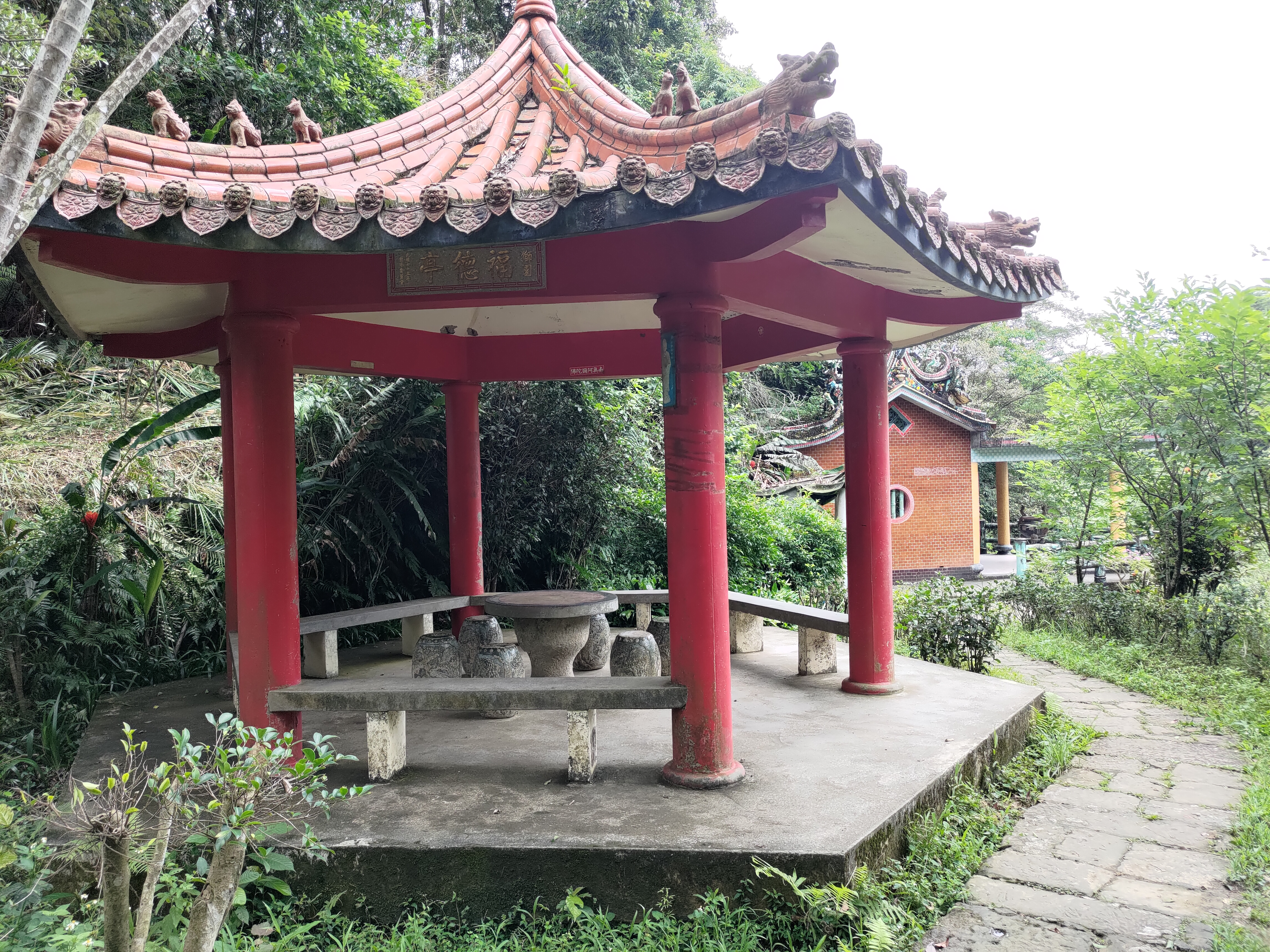
Lion Garden Fude Pavilion next to the CUST walking path

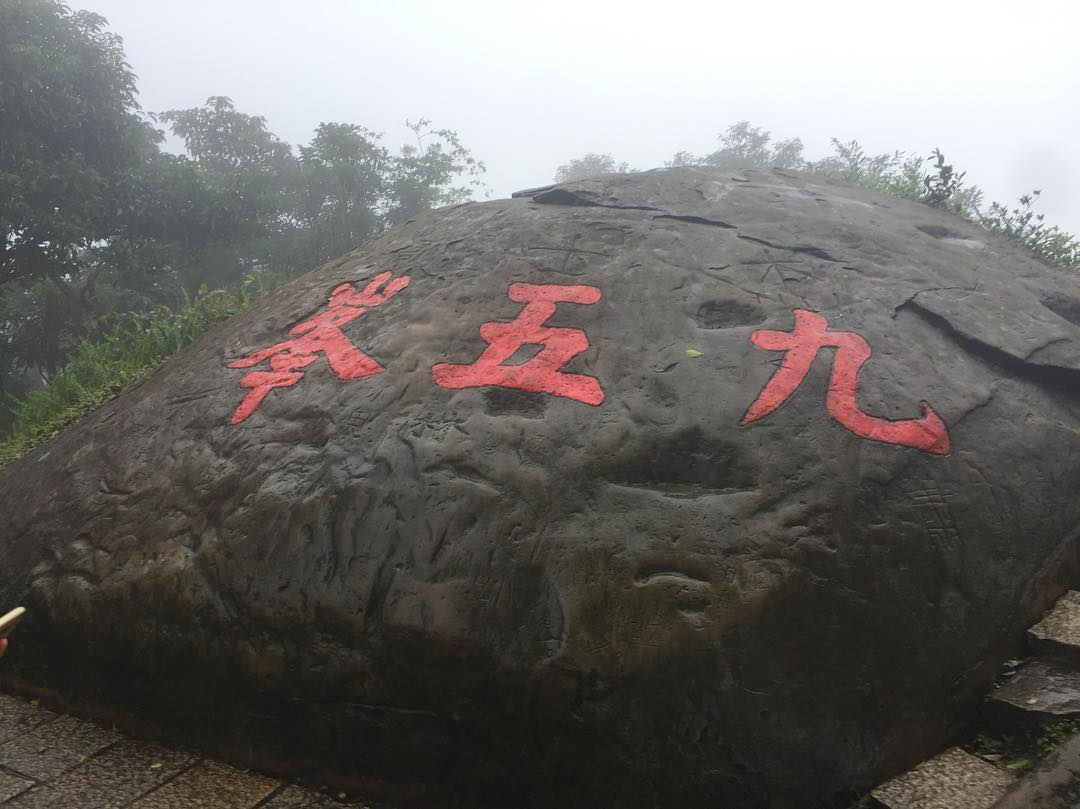
Ninety-five Peaks Giant Rock

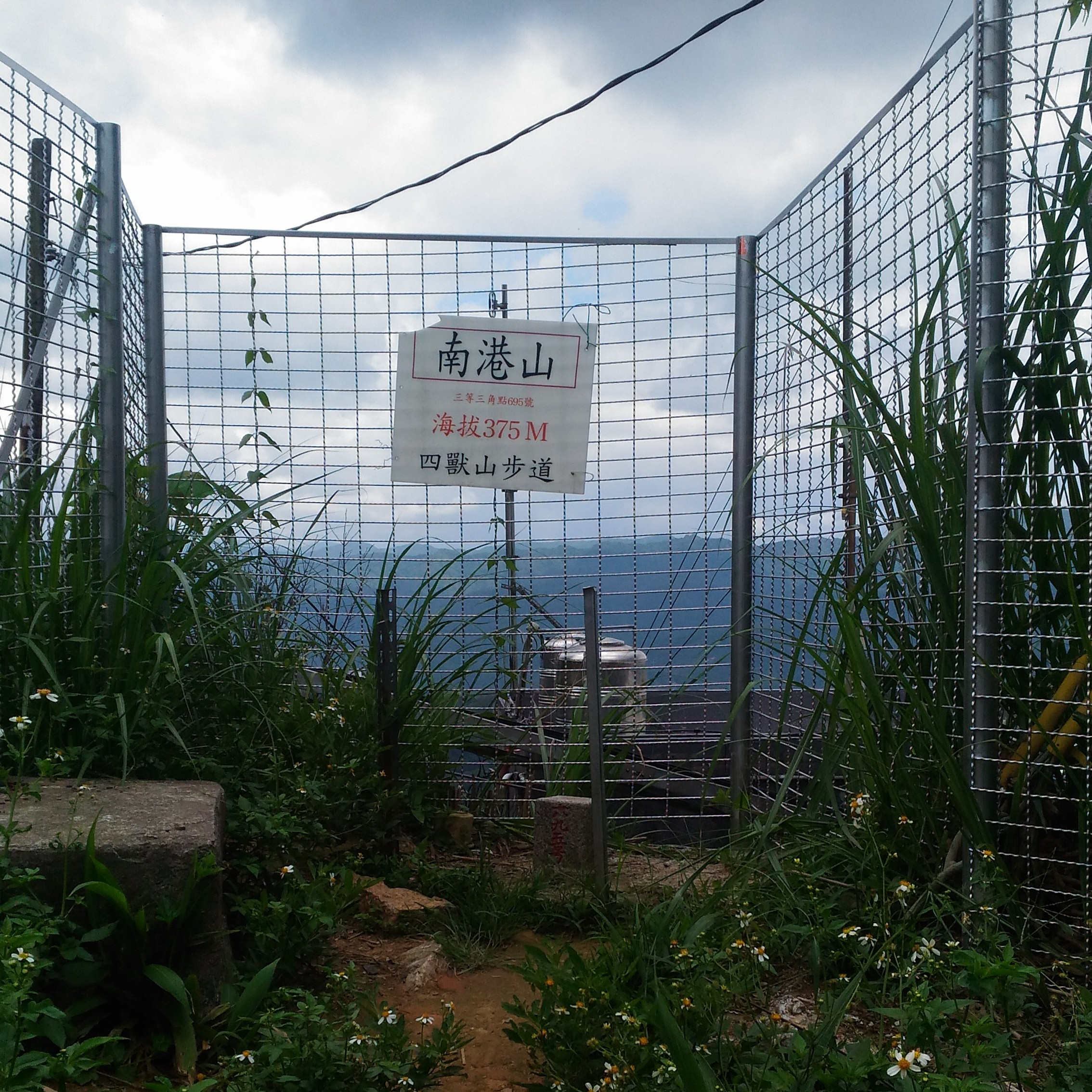
Nangang Mountain Third-Order Triangulation Point

Section 7 (World Mountain Villa / National Chengchi University – Flying Dragon Trail)

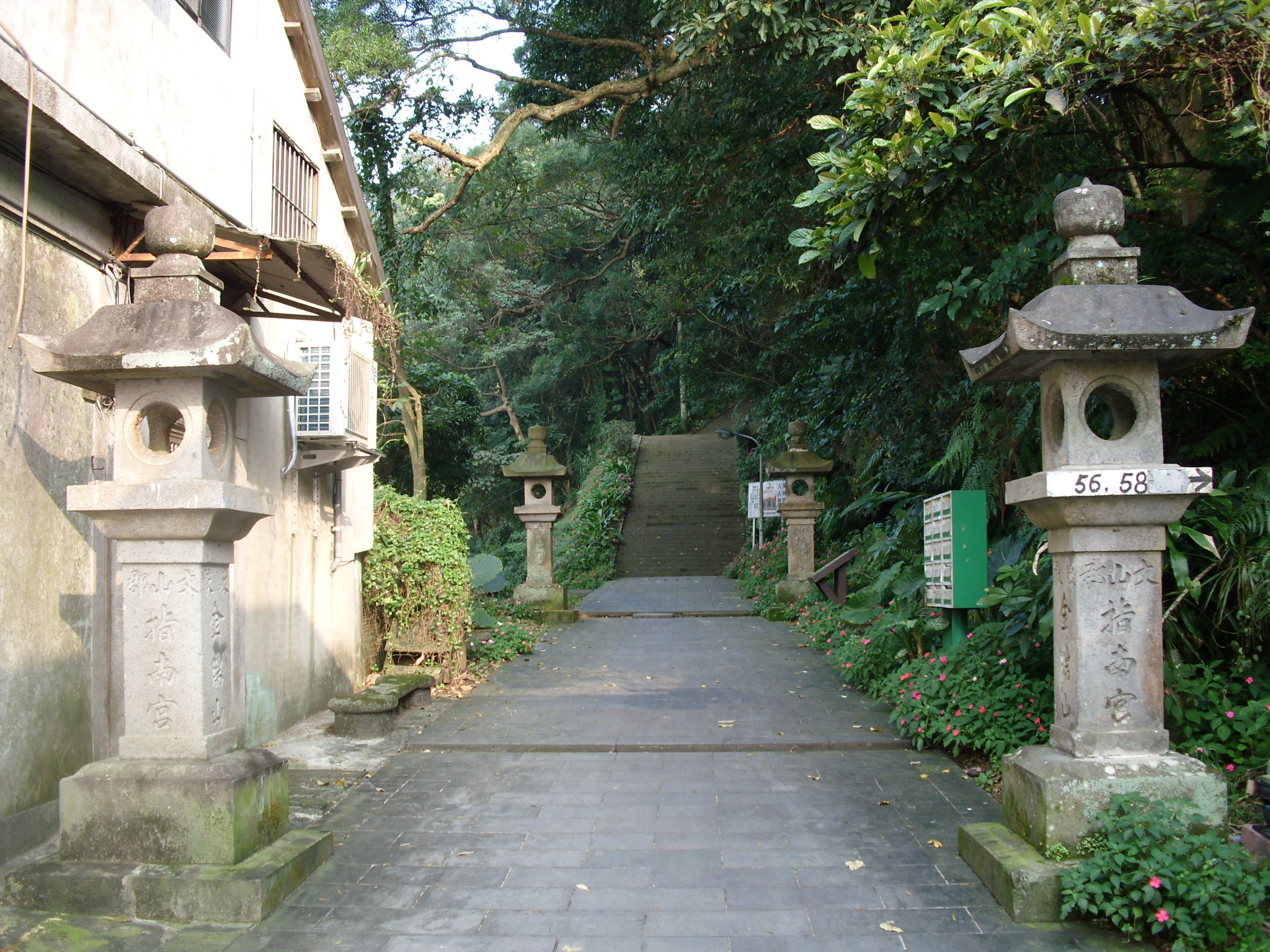
Zhinan Temple Bamboo and Cypress Temple

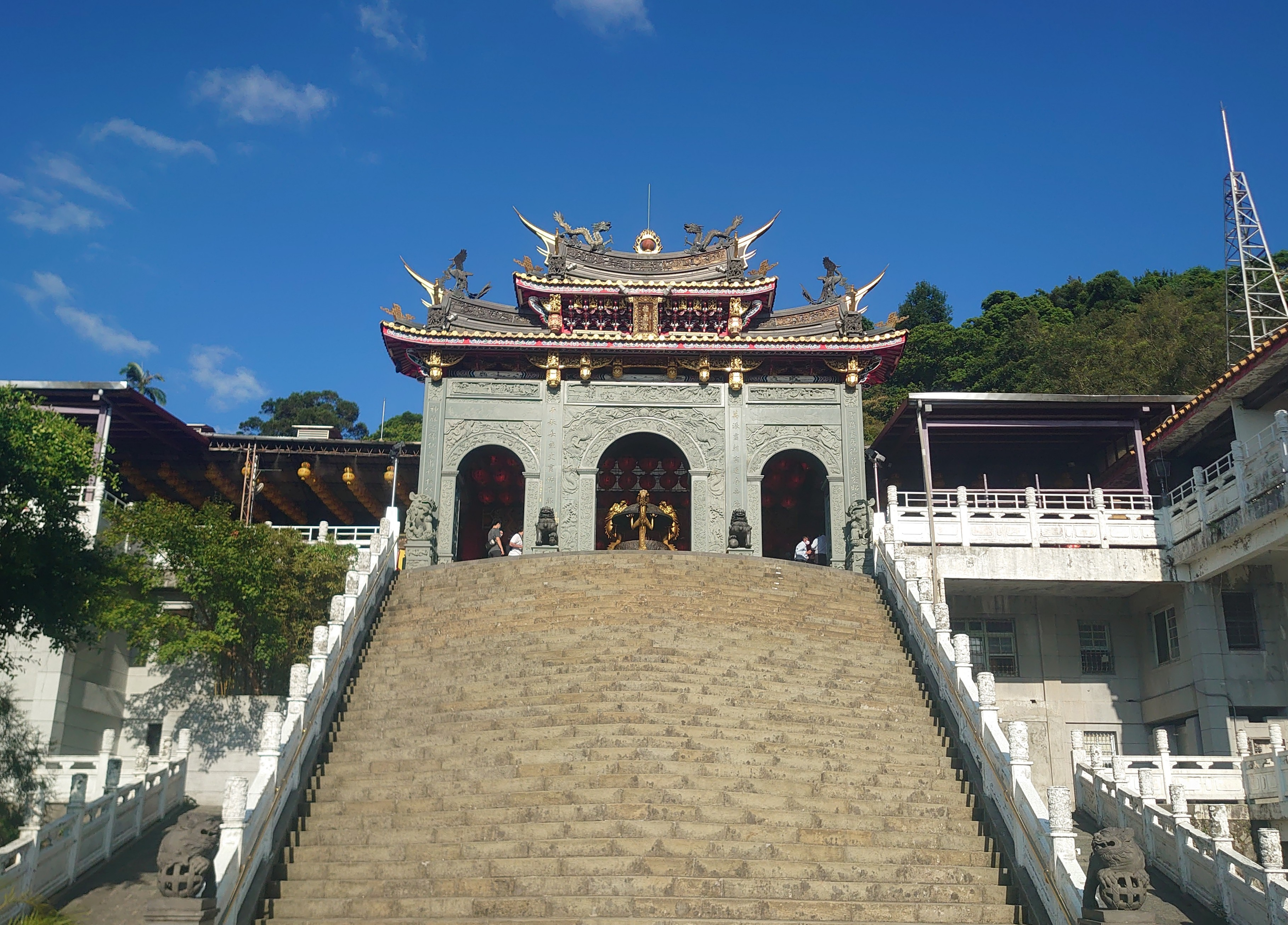
The curved staircase in front of the Chunyang Hall of Zhinan Temple

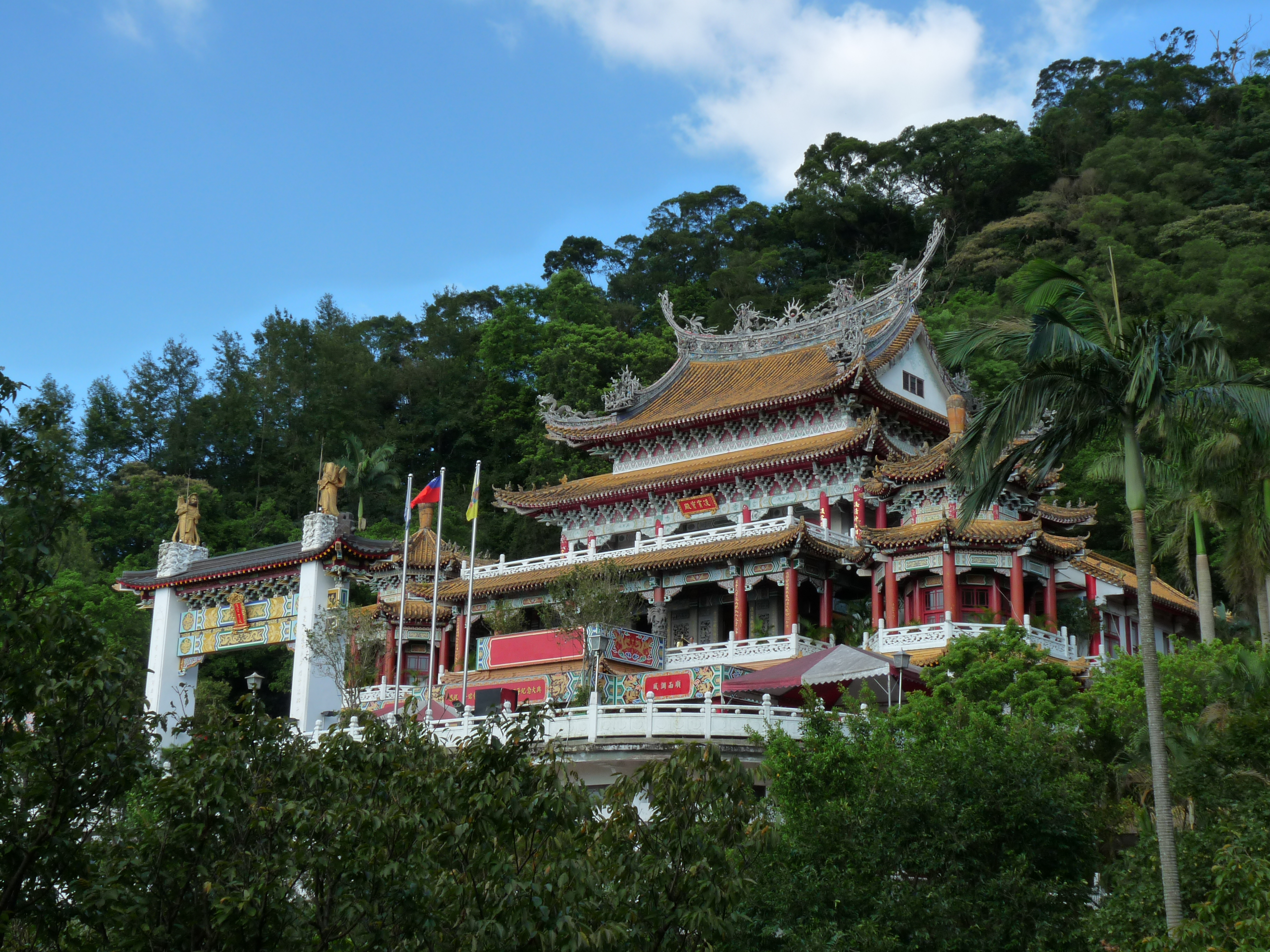
Zhinan Temple, Lingxiao Palace

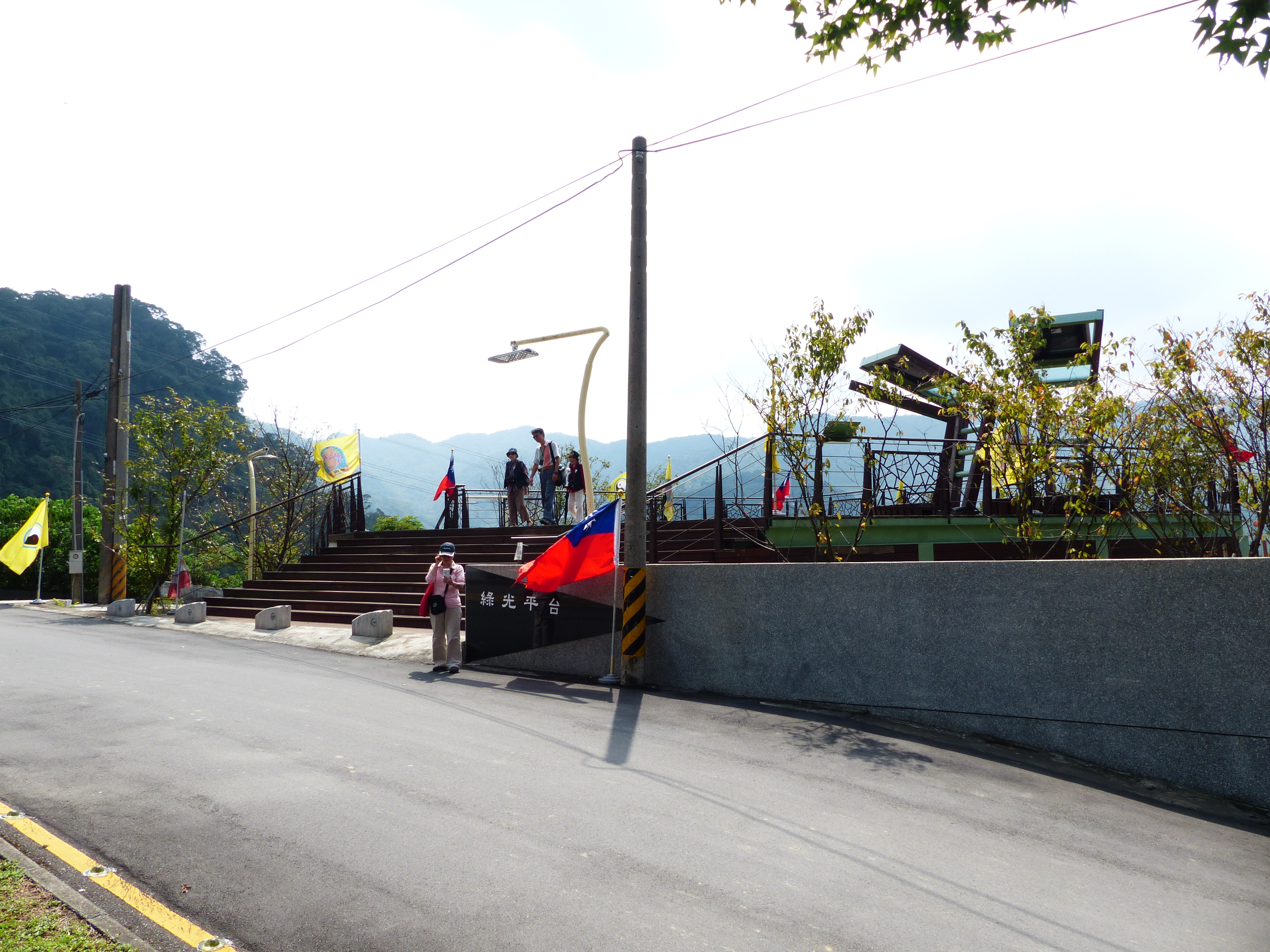
Green Light Platform next to the Maokong Gondola's Zhinan Temple gondola station

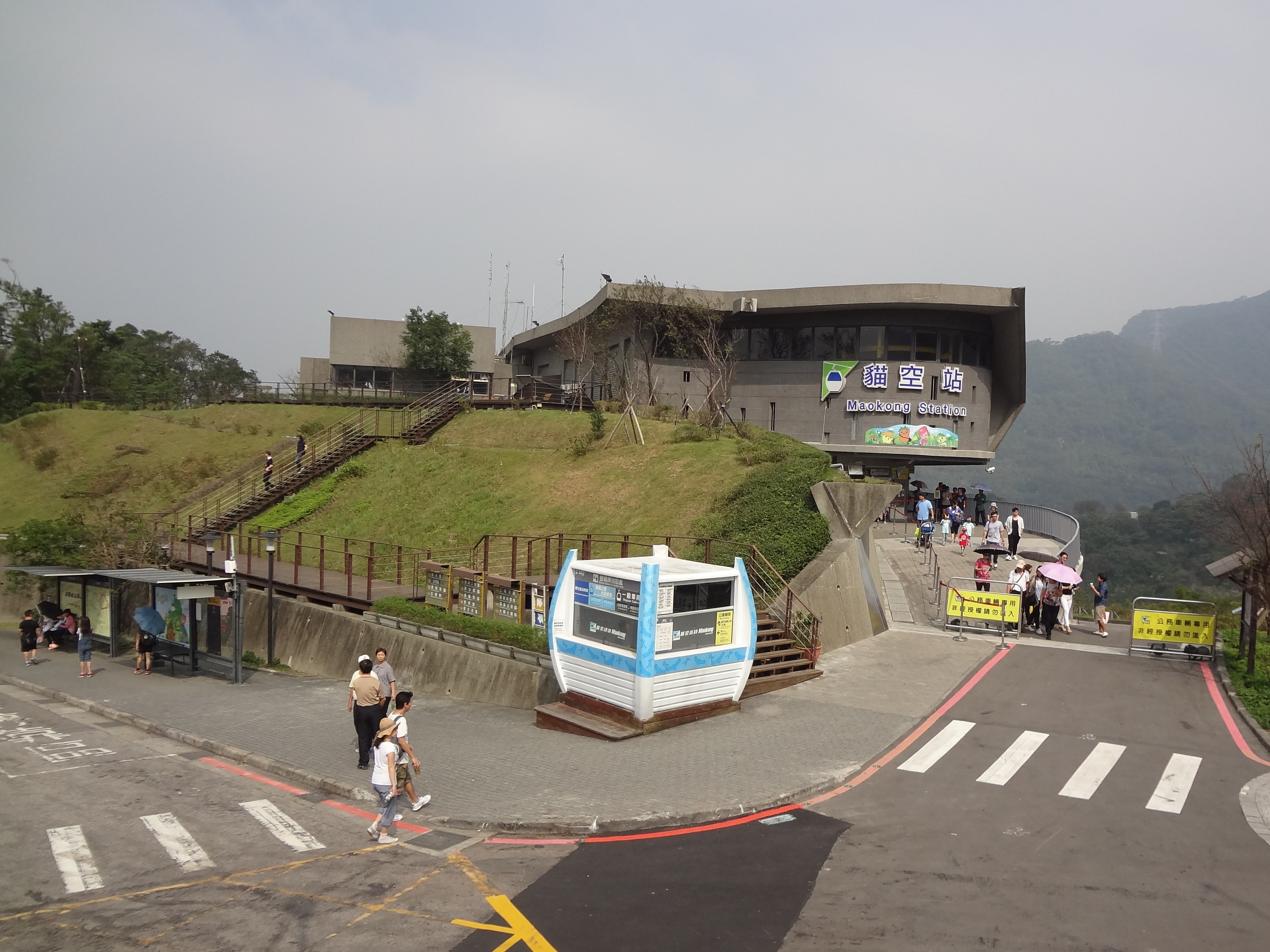
Maokong gondola station

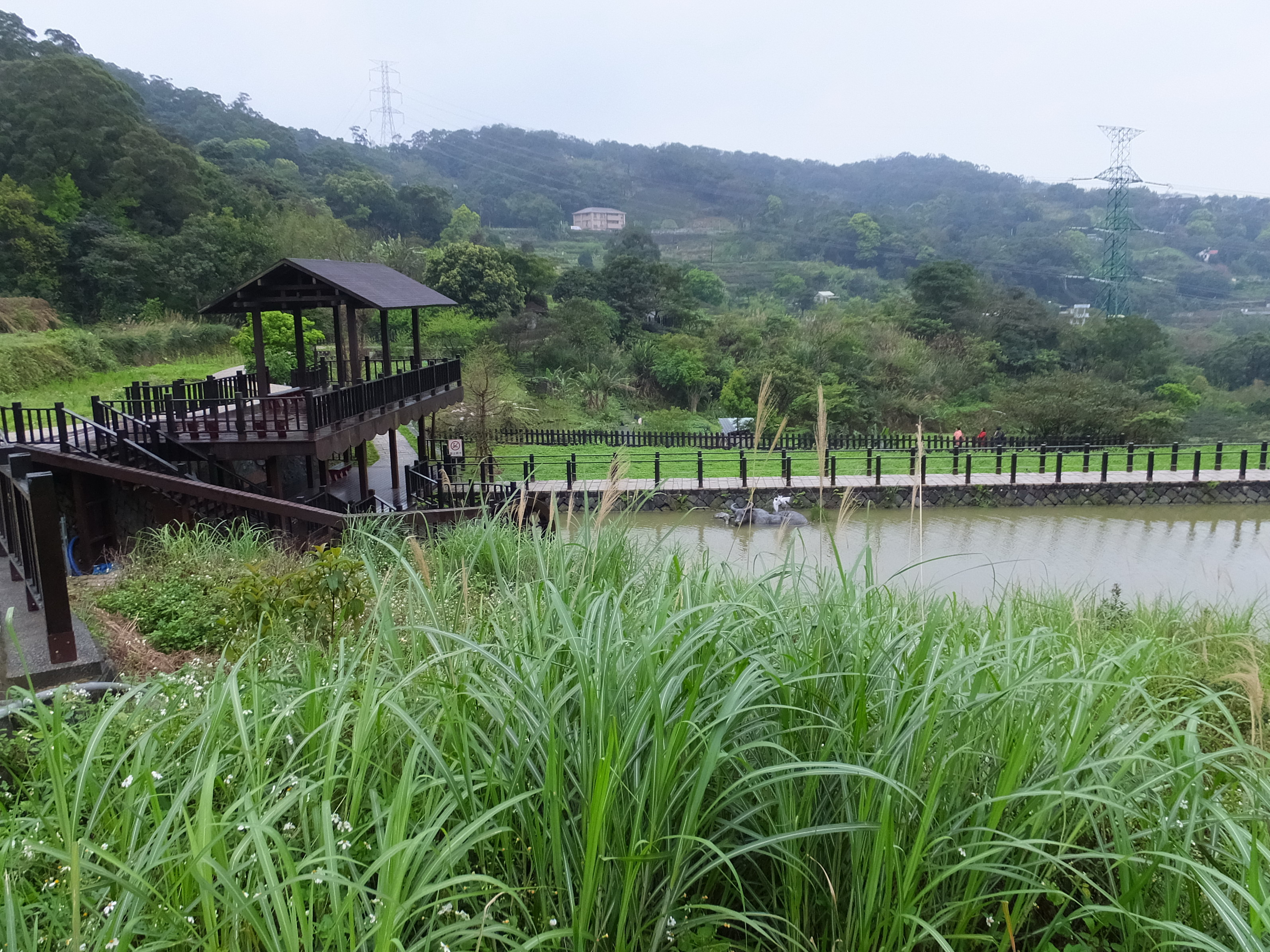
Camphor Tree Trail and Caiyun Pavilion

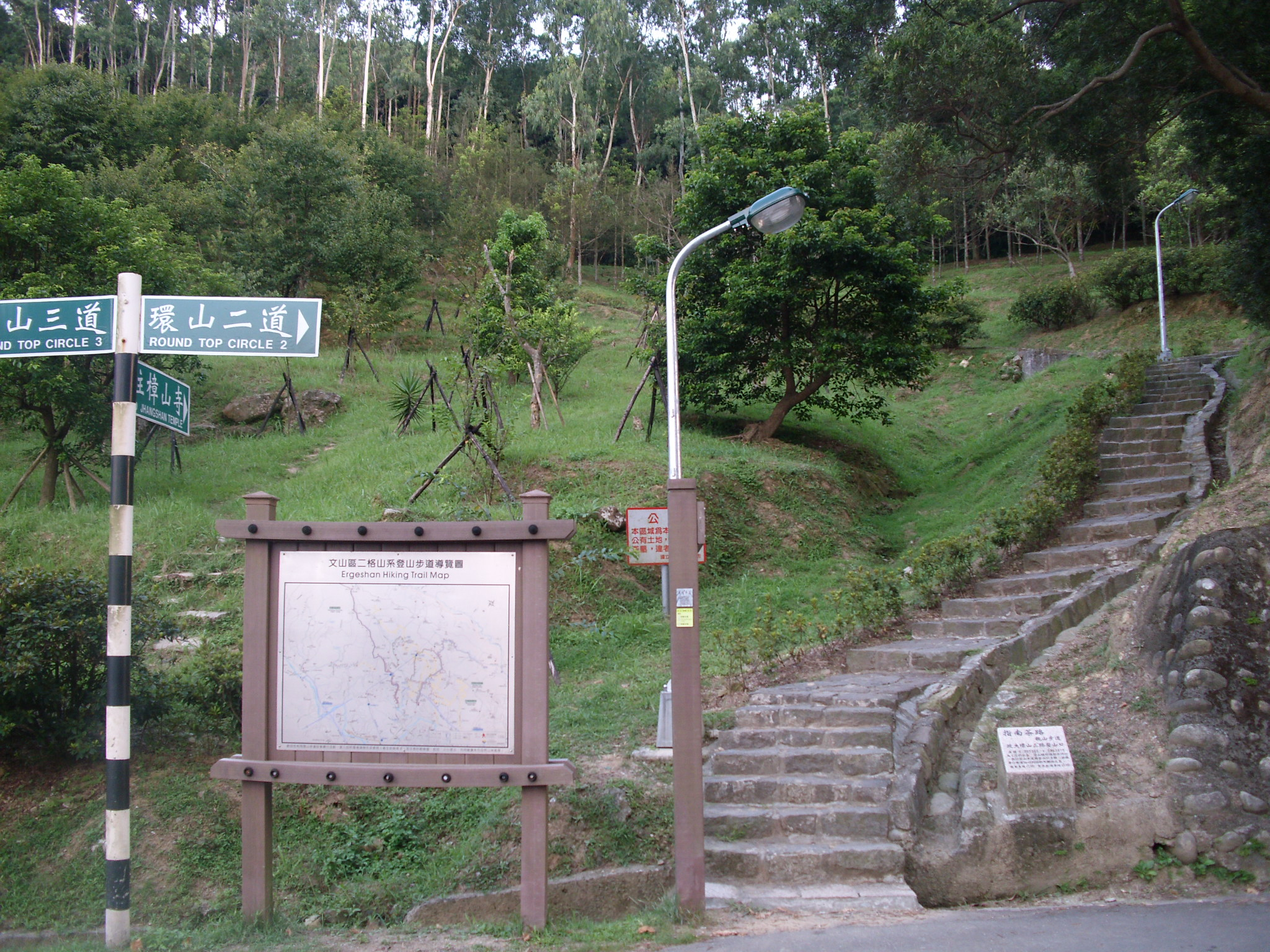
Feilong Trail Back Mountain Trail entrance of National Chengchi University

Section 8 (MRT Zoo Station - MRT Guandu Station)

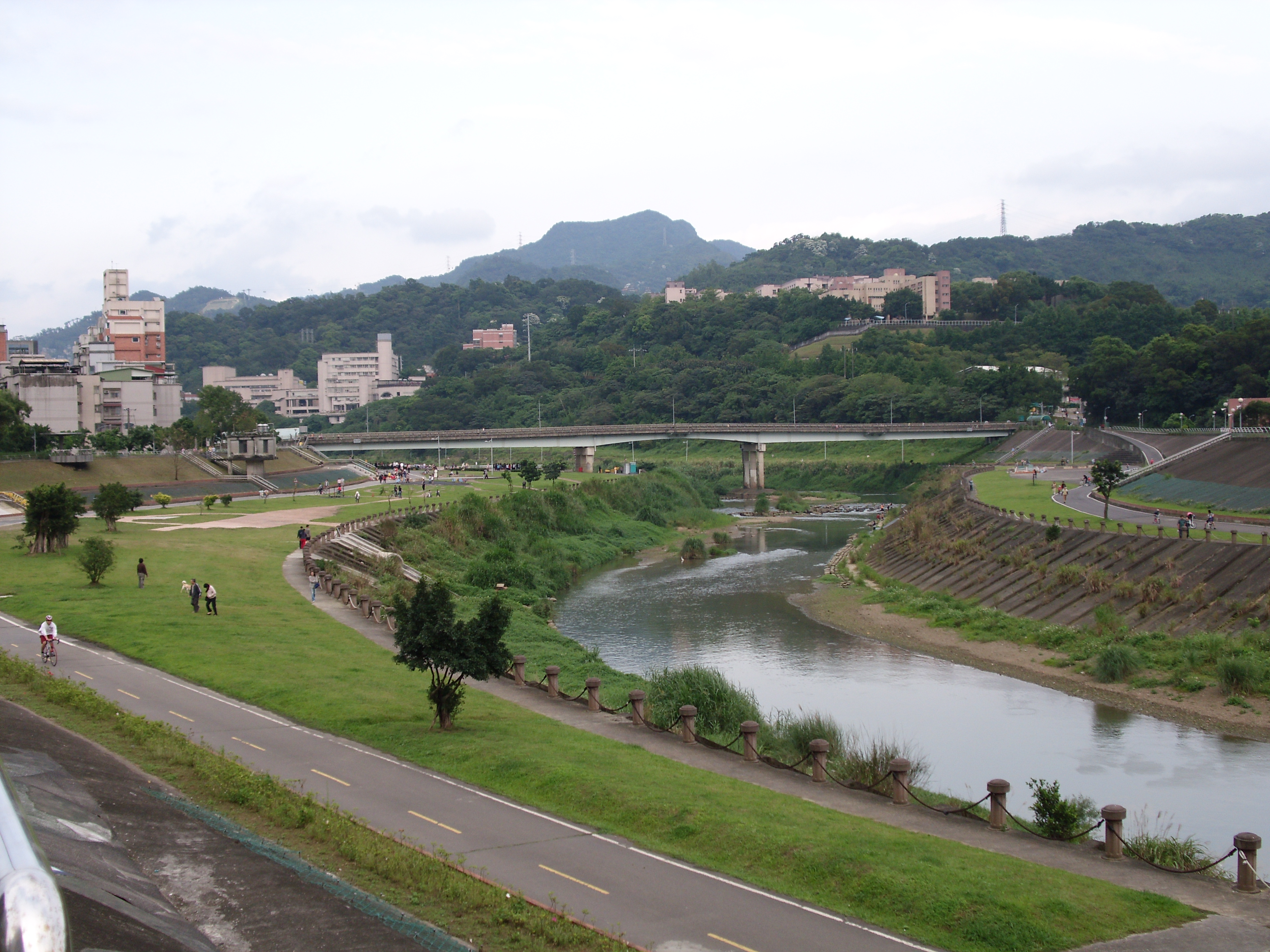
Donan Riverside Park

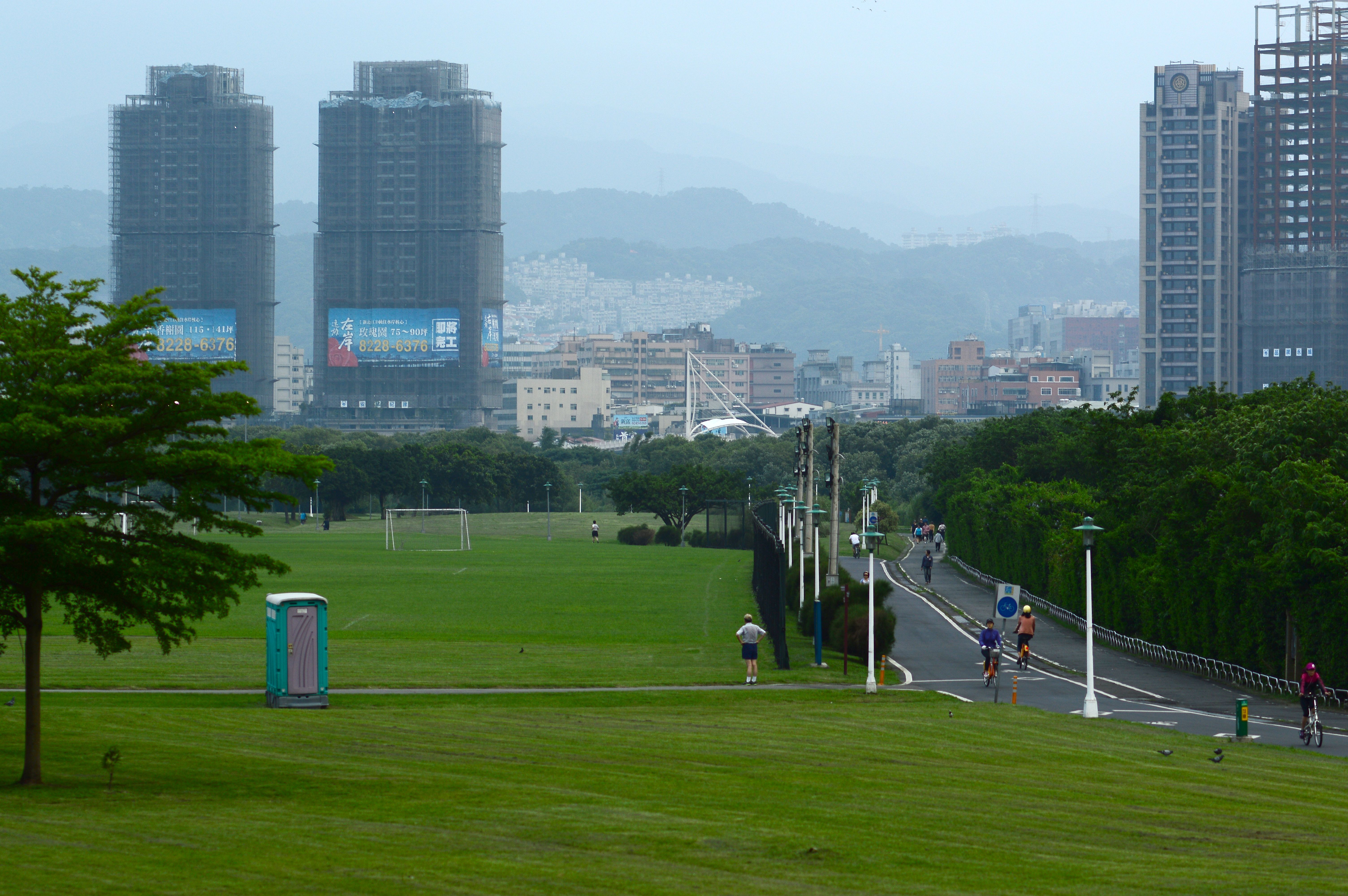
Guting Riverside Park

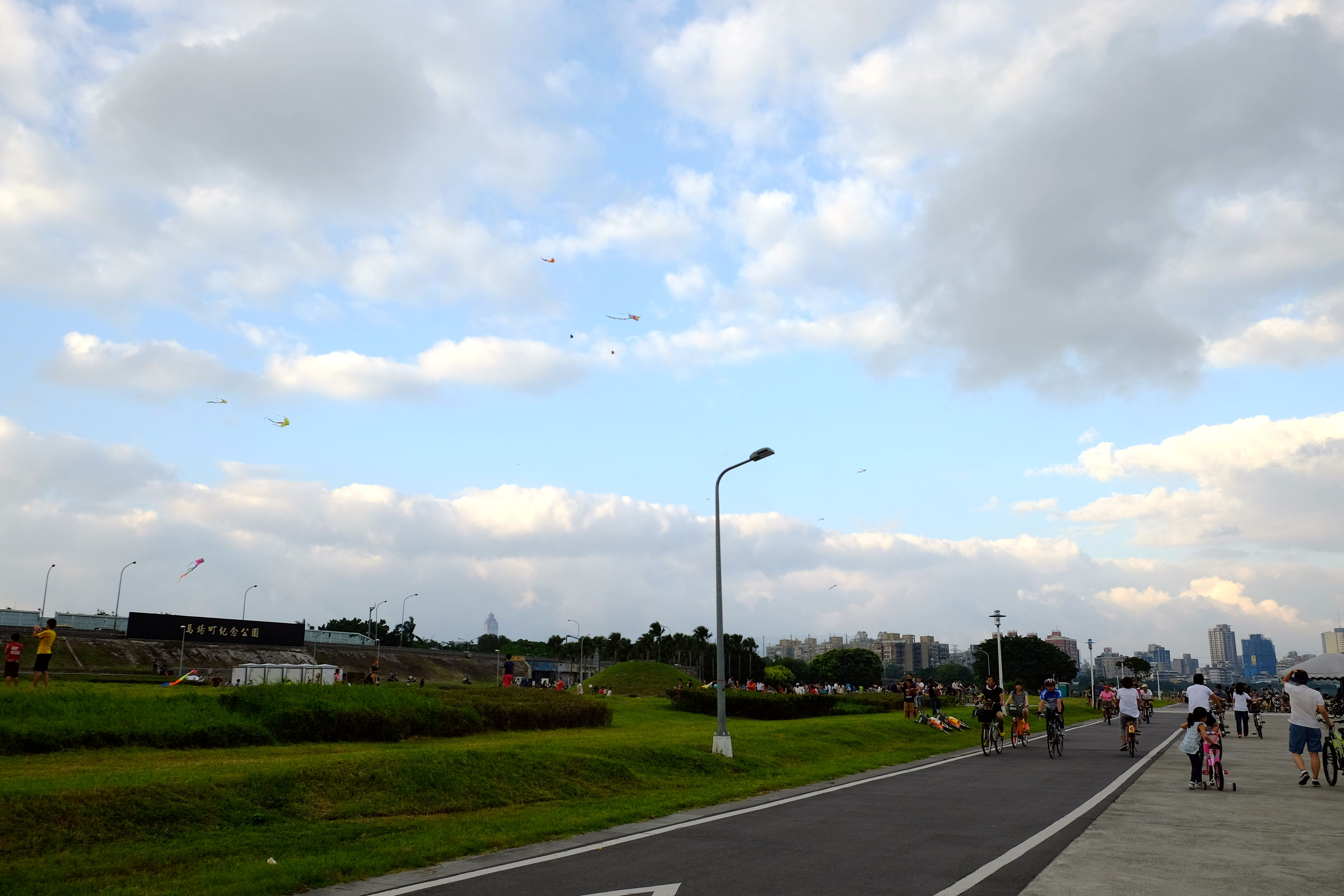
Machangding Memorial Park

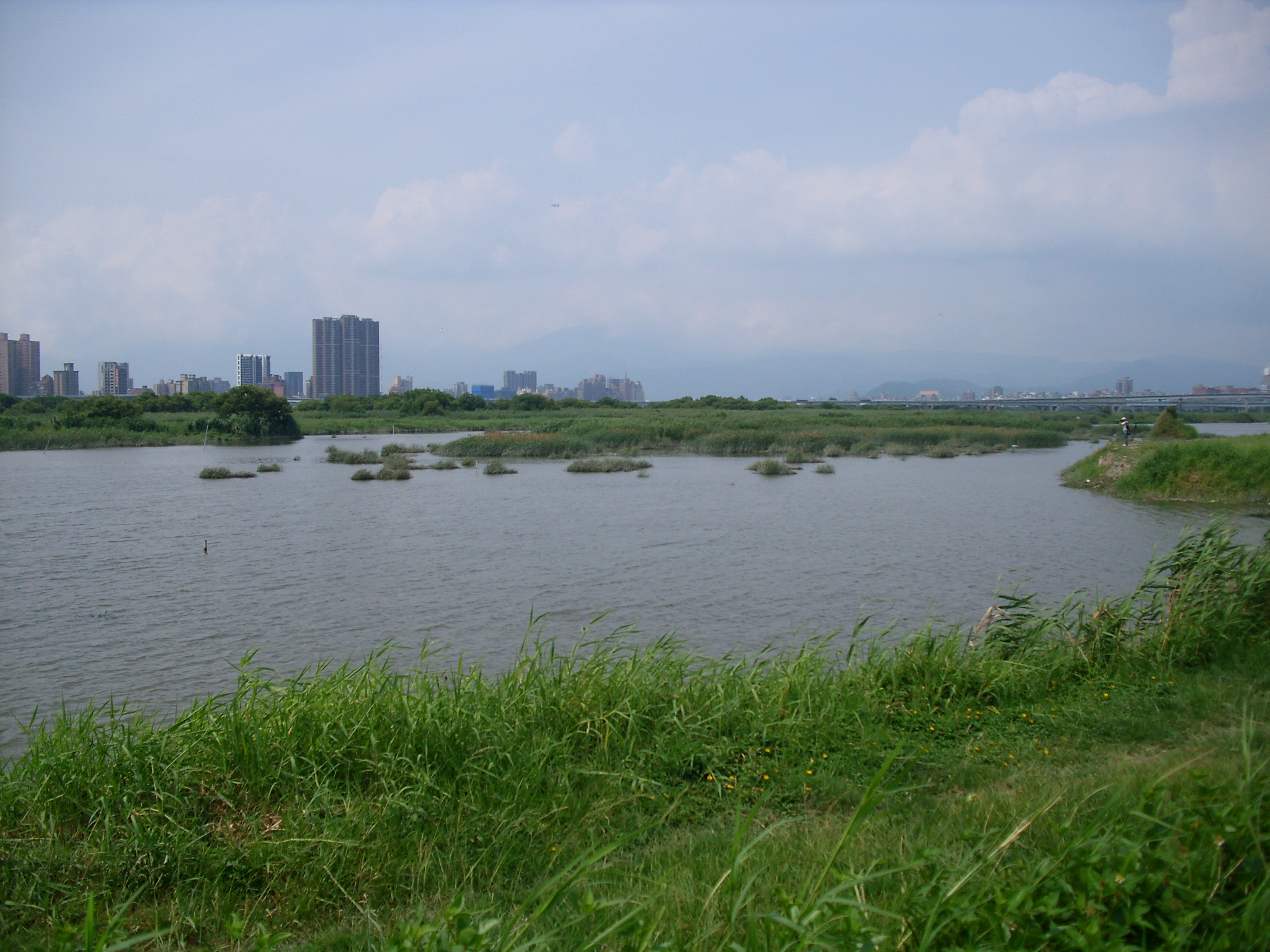
Taipei Wild Goose Reserve

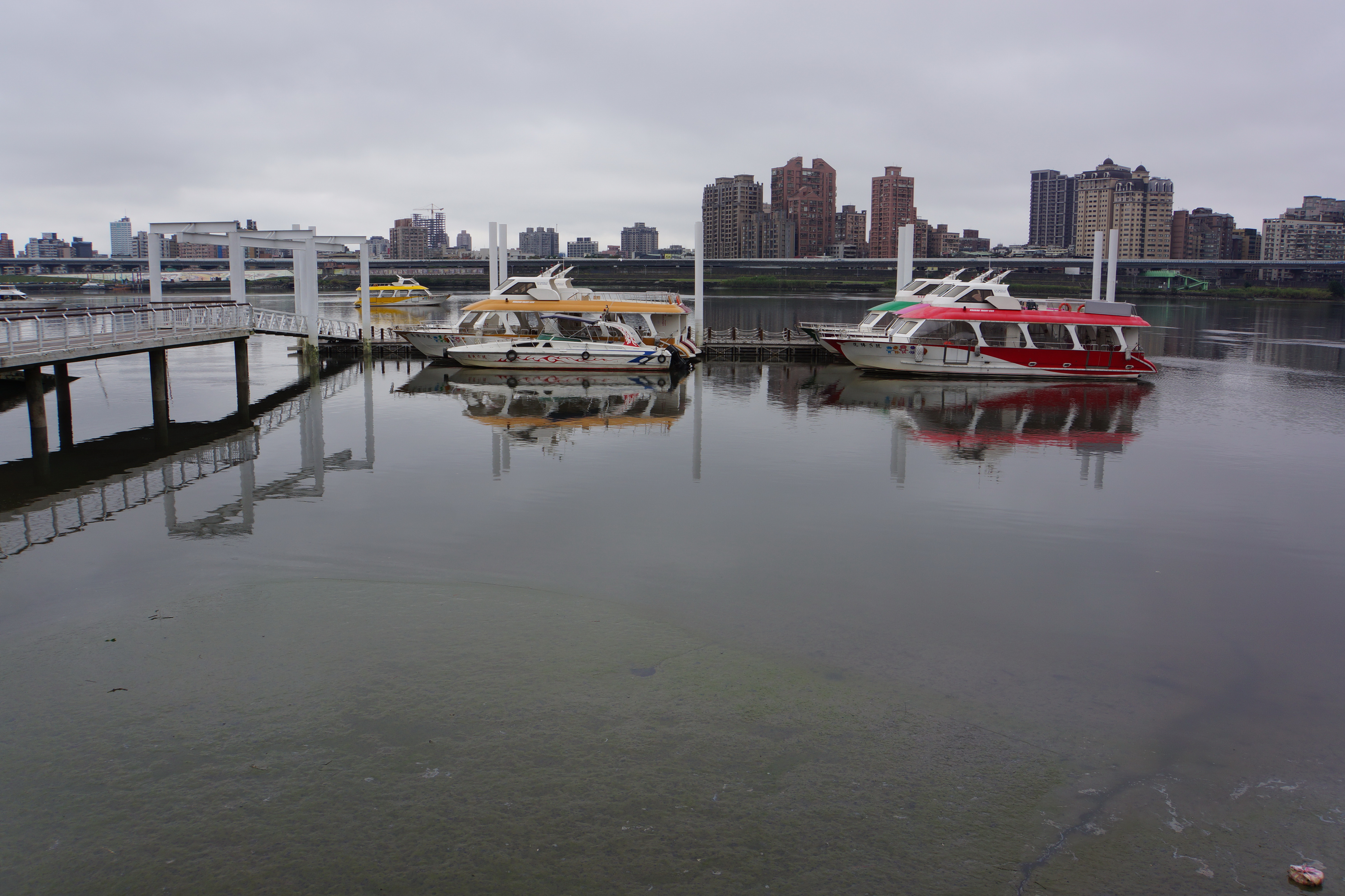
Dadaocheng

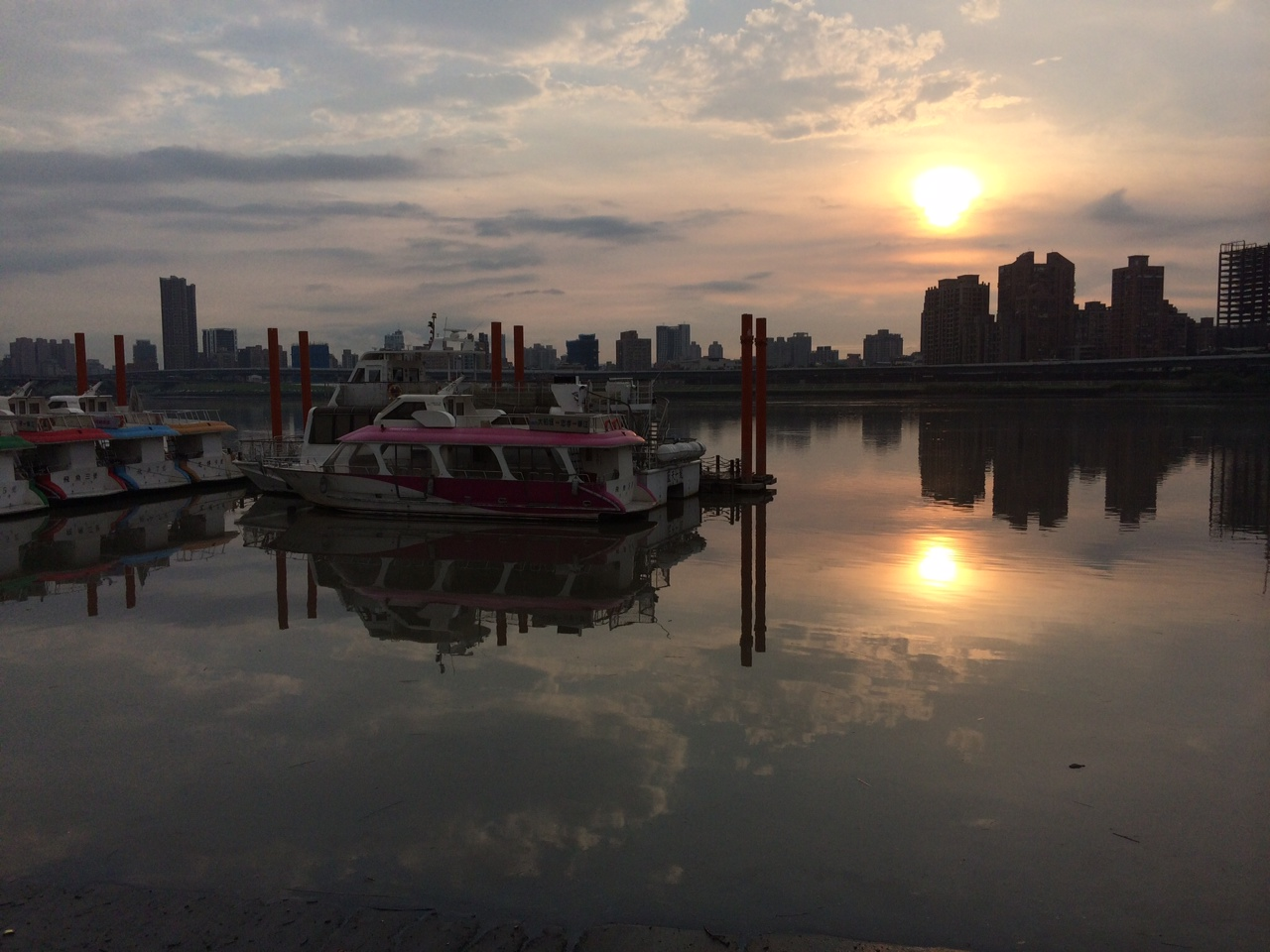
Sunset at Dadaocheng Pier

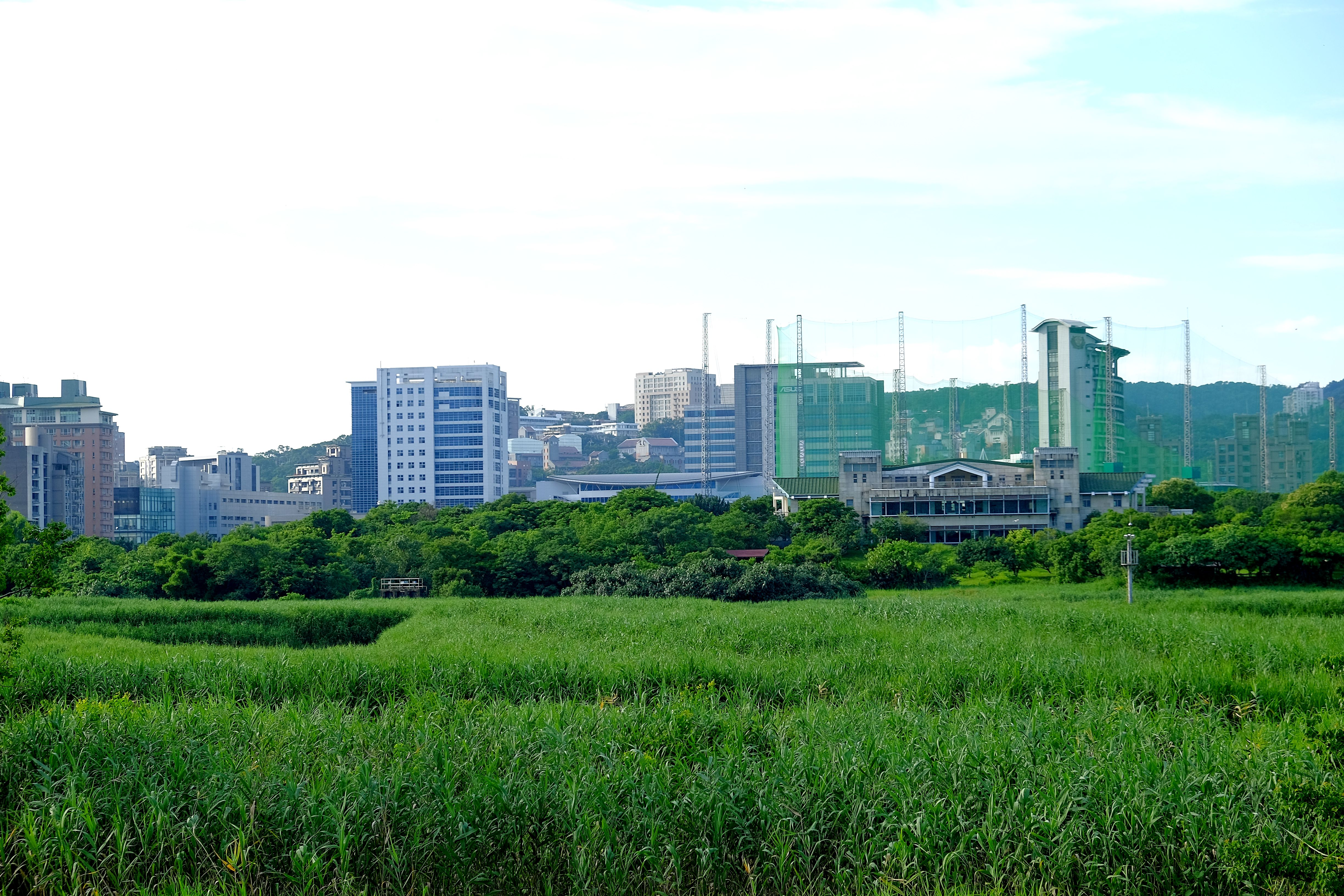
Guandu Nature Park
