= Bailing Sport Park =

Sport venue in Taipei, Taiwan

- 百齡運動公園
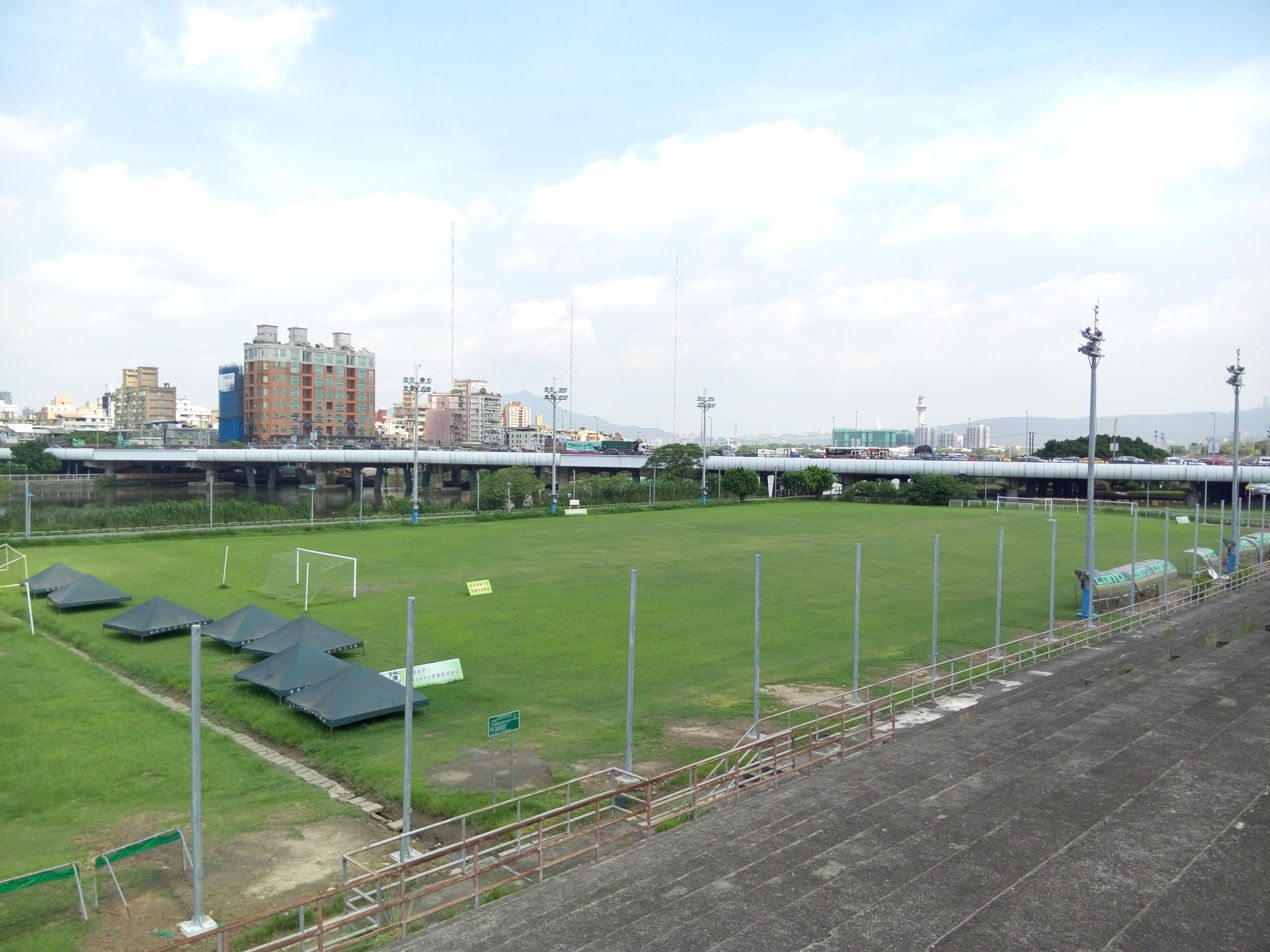
- Interactive map of Bailing Sport Park
- Type: Park
- Location: Shilin, Taipei, Taiwan
- Coordinates: 25°04′52″N 121°31′01″E
- Area: 28 hectares (69 acres)
- Opened: 1989

Bailing Sport Park (Chinese: 百齡運動公園; pinyin: Bǎilíng Yùndòng Gōngyuán) is a multi-use sport venue located in Shilin District, Taipei, Taiwan. The park has been open since 1989. It resides along Shilin and Shezi shores of the Keelung River, with around 2,900 meters (9,500 ft) in length and 60–100 meters (200–330 ft) in width. Total surface area is around 280,000 m^{2}.

== Facilities ==
- 5 basketball courts
- 5 baseball and softball fields
- 1 croquet court
- 2 football pitches
- 3 rugby fields
- 1 roller skating rink
- 7 tennis courts

== See also ==
- List of parks in Taiwan
