= Shezi =

Shezi is a surname. Notable people with the surname include:

- Khulekani Shezi (born 2001), South African soccer player
- Mthokozisi Shezi (born 1987), South African cricketer and umpire
- Mthuli ka Shezi (1947–1972), South African playwright and political activist
- Nkosentsha Shezi (1976–2026), South African politician
