= Chungcheng =

Alternatively romanized ("Tongyong Pinyin") street sign

Chungcheng (Chinese: 中正) is a common name for places, roads, schools or organizations in Chinese-speaking areas, predominantly in Taiwan. The majority of these places and things were named after Chiang Chung-cheng, the preferred given name of Chiang Kai-shek. Most streets, buildings, and schools named "Chungcheng" were renamed during the "de-Chiang-ification" campaign of the early 2000s.

== Origin ==
The majority of these places and institutions are named after Chiang Kai-shek per Republican Chinese precedent (ex: Chungshan for Sun Yat-sen).

== Standard romanizations in Mandarin ==
- Wade-Giles: Chungcheng
- MPS II: Jungjeng
- Tongyong Pinyin: Jhongjheng
- Hanyu Pinyin: Zhongzheng

== Usage ==
=== Administrative divisions ===
- Zhongzheng District (中正區), Taipei
- Zhongzheng District (中正區), Keelung
- Taoyuan Zhongzheng Arts and Cultural Business District (桃園中正藝文特區), Taoyuan
- There are numerous "Zhongzheng Villages" (中正里) in Taiwan.

=== Roads ===
- Many cities in Taiwan have one or more major streets called "Zhongzheng Road" or "Zhongzheng Street".
- Many cities in mainland China previously had one or more major streets called "Zhongzheng Road":
  - Zhongzheng Road was a major east–west artery road of Shanghai, now renamed Yan'an Road.

=== Schools ===
- National Chung Cheng University (國立中正大學) is a university in Taiwan.
- Chung-Cheng Armed Forces Preparatory School (中正預校) is a military cadet school in Taiwan
- Chung Cheng High School (中正中學) is a high school in Singapore.
- There are numerous such elementary schools, and junior and senior high schools in Taiwan (中正國小, 中正國中 and 中正高中 respectively):
  - Taipei Municipal Zhong-zheng Senior High School in Taipei

=== Parks ===
- There are numerous Zhongzheng Parks in Taiwan:
  - Zhongzheng Park in Keelung
  - Zhongzheng Park in Jinhu Township, Kinmen County
- There were previously such parks in many cities in mainland China.

=== Mountains ===
- The Zhongzheng Mountain is a peak in the northern part of the Taipei basin.

=== Aviation ===
- Taiwan Taoyuan International Airport was formerly known as (officially) "Chiang Kai-shek International Airport" or (directly translated) "Chung-cheng International Airport".
- Chung Cheng Aviation Museum is an aviation museum located at Taoyuan International Airport.

=== Ships ===
- ROCS Chung Cheng is the name of several ships of the Republic of China Navy.

=== Awards ===
- Order of Chiang Chung-Cheng
- The Chung-cheng Sword was awarded by Chiang Kai-shek to graduates of the Whampoa Military Academy.

== See also ==
- Romanization of Chinese in the Republic of China
- Chung Shan (disambiguation)
