= Hell Valley =

Hell Valley or Valley of Hell may refer to:

- Höllental (Black Forest), a deep valley in the state of Baden-Württemberg, Germany
  - Hell Valley Railway, a line that runs through the valley
- Höllental (Franconian Forest), a protected nature reserve in Bavaria, Germany
- Höllental (Lower Austria), a valley in the Alps along the River Schwarza
- Höllental (Wetterstein), a mountain path up the Zugspitze on the German-Austrian border
- Val d'Enfer, a valley in Provence, France
- The Valley of Hell (film), a 1927 American Western
- Thermal Valley, Taiwan

== See also ==
- Heil Valley, Victoria Land, Antarctica
- Hill Valley (disambiguation)
