= Taipei Public Library Beitou Branch =

- 臺北市立圖書館北投分館
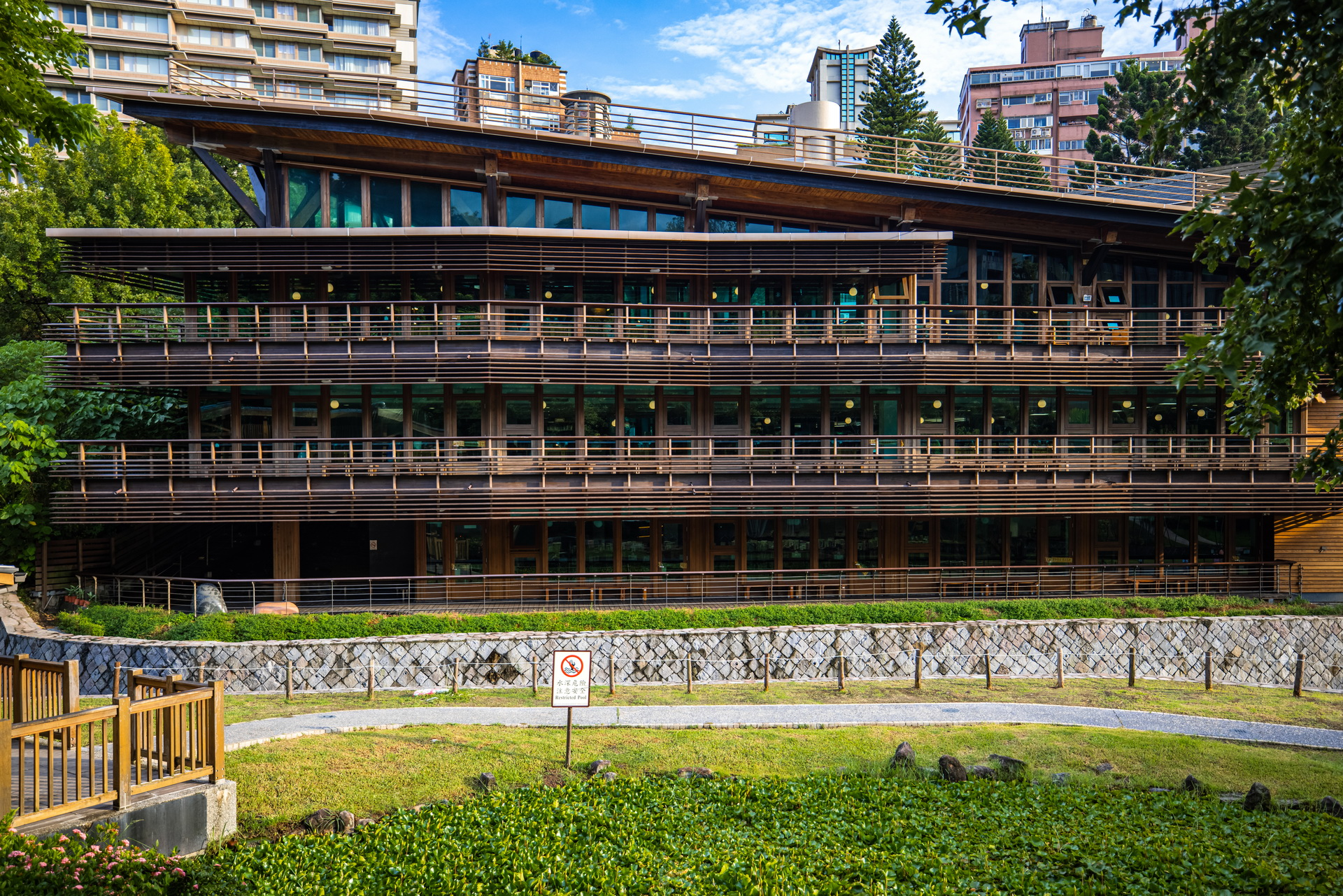
- 25°8′11″N 121°30′23″E
- Location: Beitou, Taipei, Taiwan, Republic of China (Taiwan)
- Type: Public library
- Established: November 2006
- Branch of: Taipei Public Library

Taipei Public Library Beitou Branch (Chinese: 臺北市立圖書館北投分館; pinyin: Táiběi Shìlì Túshūguǎn Běitóu Fēnguǎn) is a public library in Beitou Park, located within Beitou District, Taipei, Taiwan. It is Taiwan's first green library.

== History ==
The library was opened in November 2006.

== Architecture ==
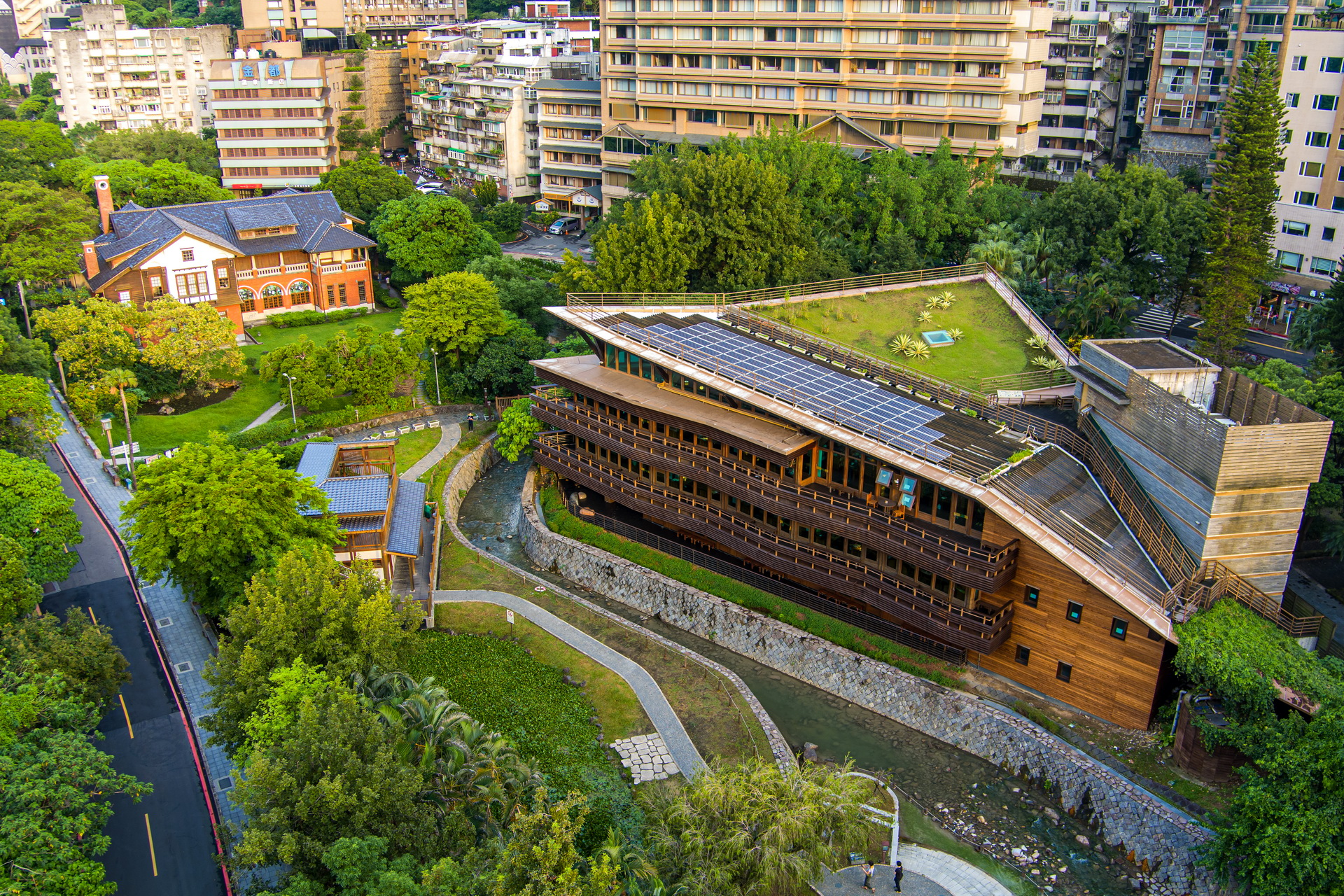
Aerial photo of the library and Beitou Hot Spring Museum

It is a two-story building and it is notable as being constructed to be an eco-friendly green building, in which the building was designed to curb water and electricity consumption. It was designed by Bio-Architecture Formosana. The building uses large windows to reduce the consumption of lighting electricity. The roof was designed to be partially covered with photovoltaic cells to generate electricity and also designed to capture rain water to be stored and used to flush toilets.

== Transportation ==
The library is accessible within walking distance East from Xinbeitou Station of the Taipei Metro.

== See also ==
- List of libraries in Taipei
