= Thermal Valley =

Valley in Beitou, Taipei, Taiwan

- 地獄谷
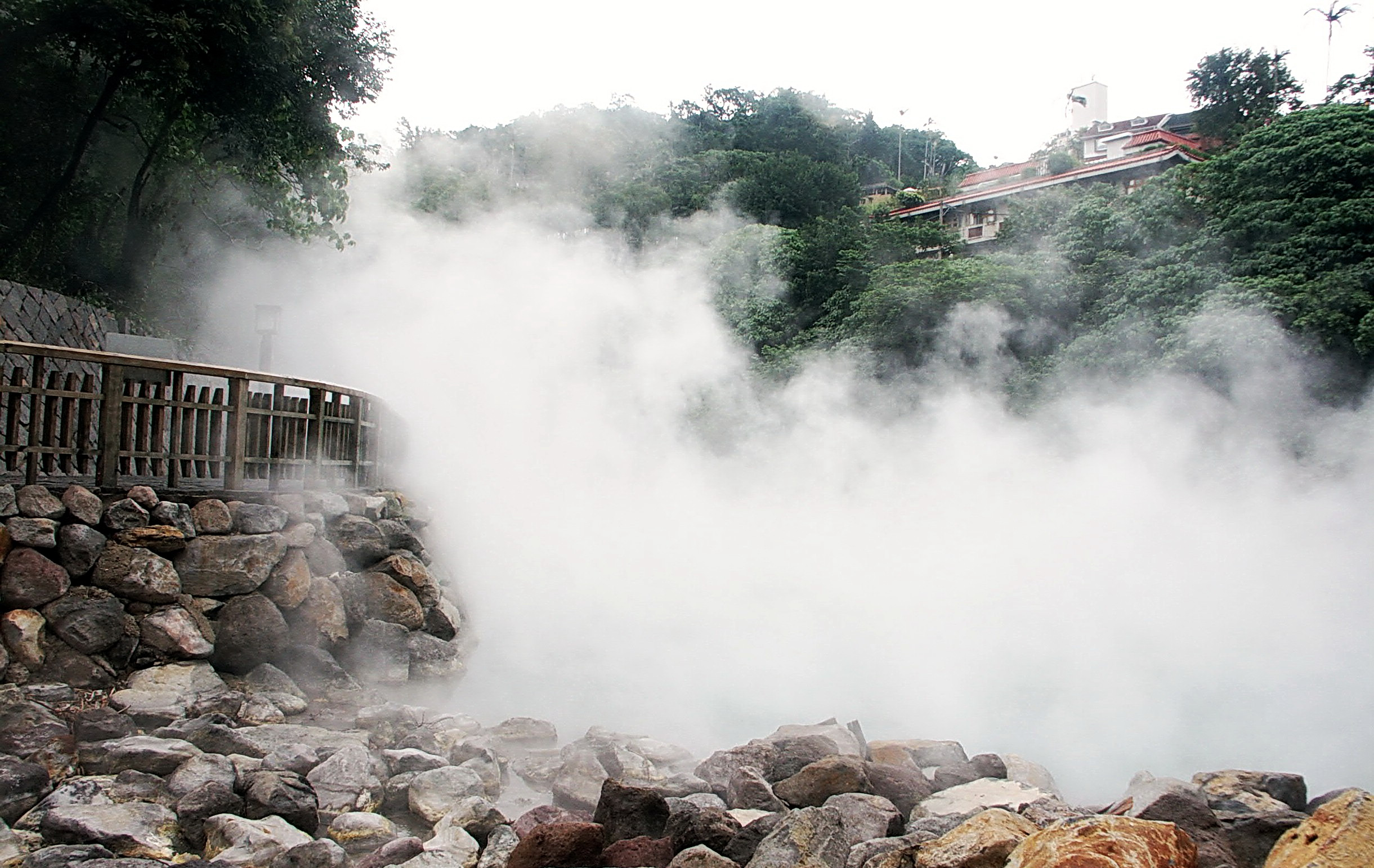

Geology
- Type: valley

Geography
- Location: Beitou, Taipei, Taiwan
- Interactive map of Thermal Valley

The Thermal Valley (traditional Chinese: 地獄谷; simplified Chinese: 地狱谷; pinyin: Dìyù Gǔ) is a valley located on the foothill of Yangmingshan National Park in Beitou District, Taipei, Taiwan. This makes Thermal Valley one of the sources of acidic sulfur hot spring in the area. Locals also sometimes refer to it as Hell Valley. The formula of this mineral water contains Plaster, Alunite, Jarosite, Realgar, Sulfur, and Radium. pH value is between 1.4~1.6, the highest temperature could be reached to 90 Celsius. It was one of the eight attractions and twelve scenic spots in Taiwan during the Japanese colonial period.

== Access ==
Thermal Valley is accessible within walking distance east from Xinbeitou Station of the Taipei Metro.

== See also ==
- Beitou Hot Spring Museum
- Taiwanese hot springs
