= Taipei Municipal Fuxing Senior High School =

Coordinates: 25.1436°N 121.5018°E

Taipei Municipal Fuxing Senior High School 臺北市立復興高級中學
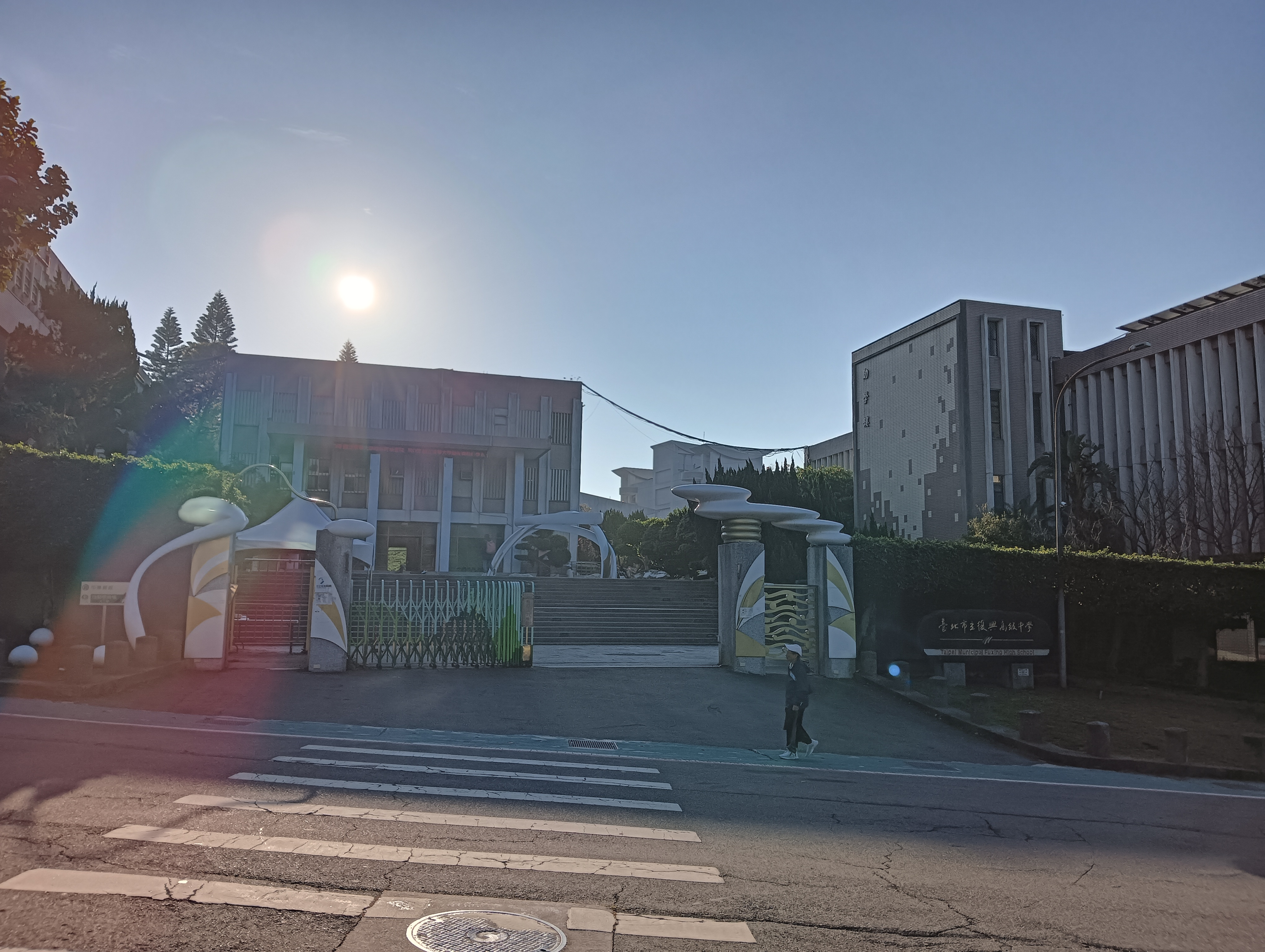

Location
- No.70, Fuxing 4th Road, Beitou District, Taipei City, Taiwan, R.O.C.

Information
- Type: Municipal High School
- Established: 1953
- School district: Beitou District, Taipei, Taiwan
- Website: http://www.fhsh.tp.edu.tw/

The Taipei Municipal Fuxing Senior High School (Chinese: 臺北市立復興高級中學; pinyin: Táiběi Shìlì Fùxīng Gāojí Zhōngxué) is a high school in Beitou District, Taipei, Taiwan.

== History ==
The school was established in 1953.

== Transportation ==
The school is accessible within walking distance north of Xinbeitou Station of Taipei Metro.

== See also ==
- Education in Taiwan
