= Beitou Museum =

Museum in Beitou, Taipei, Taiwan

- 北投文物館
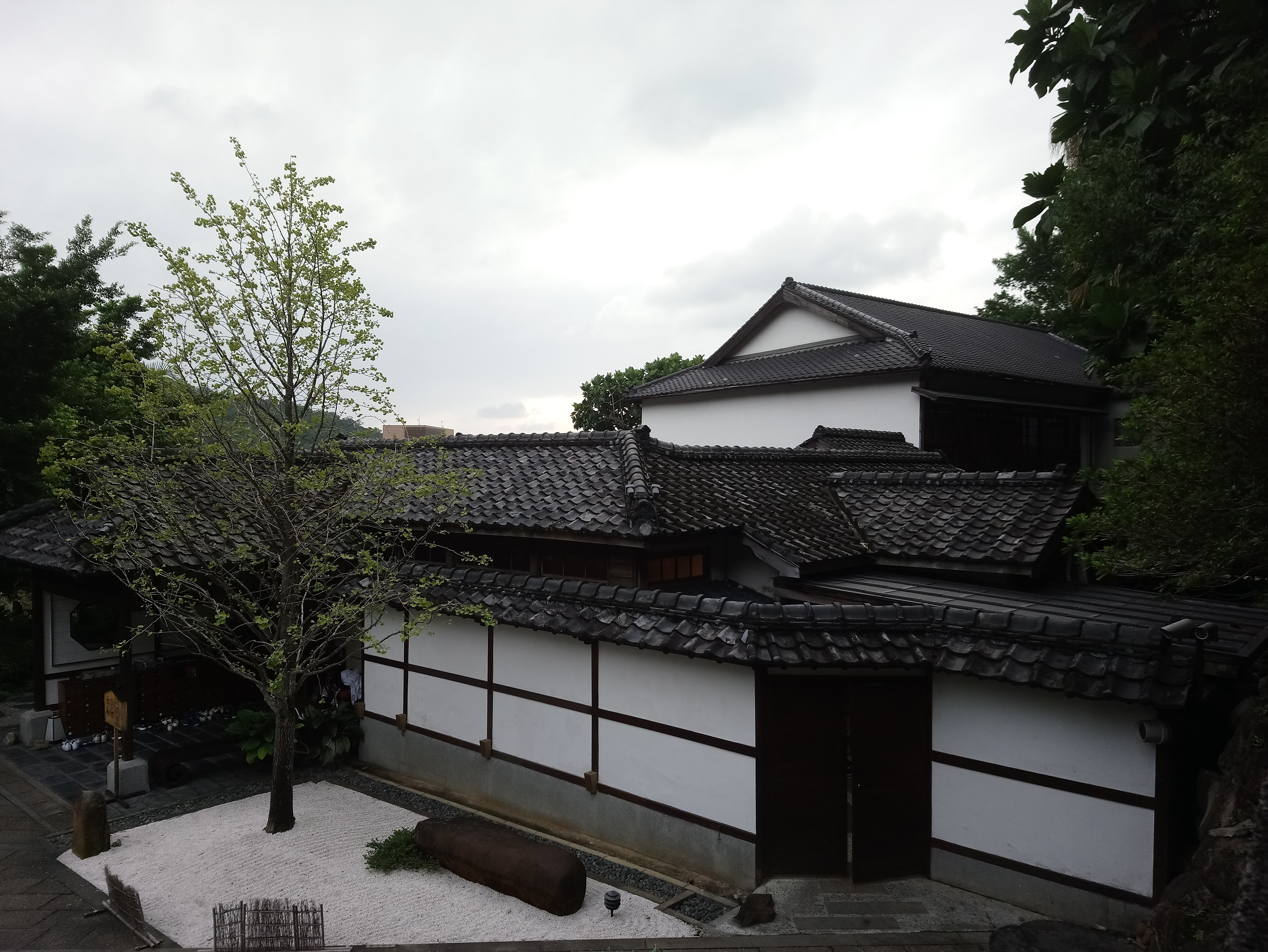
- Former name: Kazan Hotel
- Established: 2008
- Location: Beitou, Taipei, Taiwan
- Coordinates: 25°08′17″N 121°30′52″E
- Type: museum
- Public transit access: Xinbeitou Station
- Website: Official website

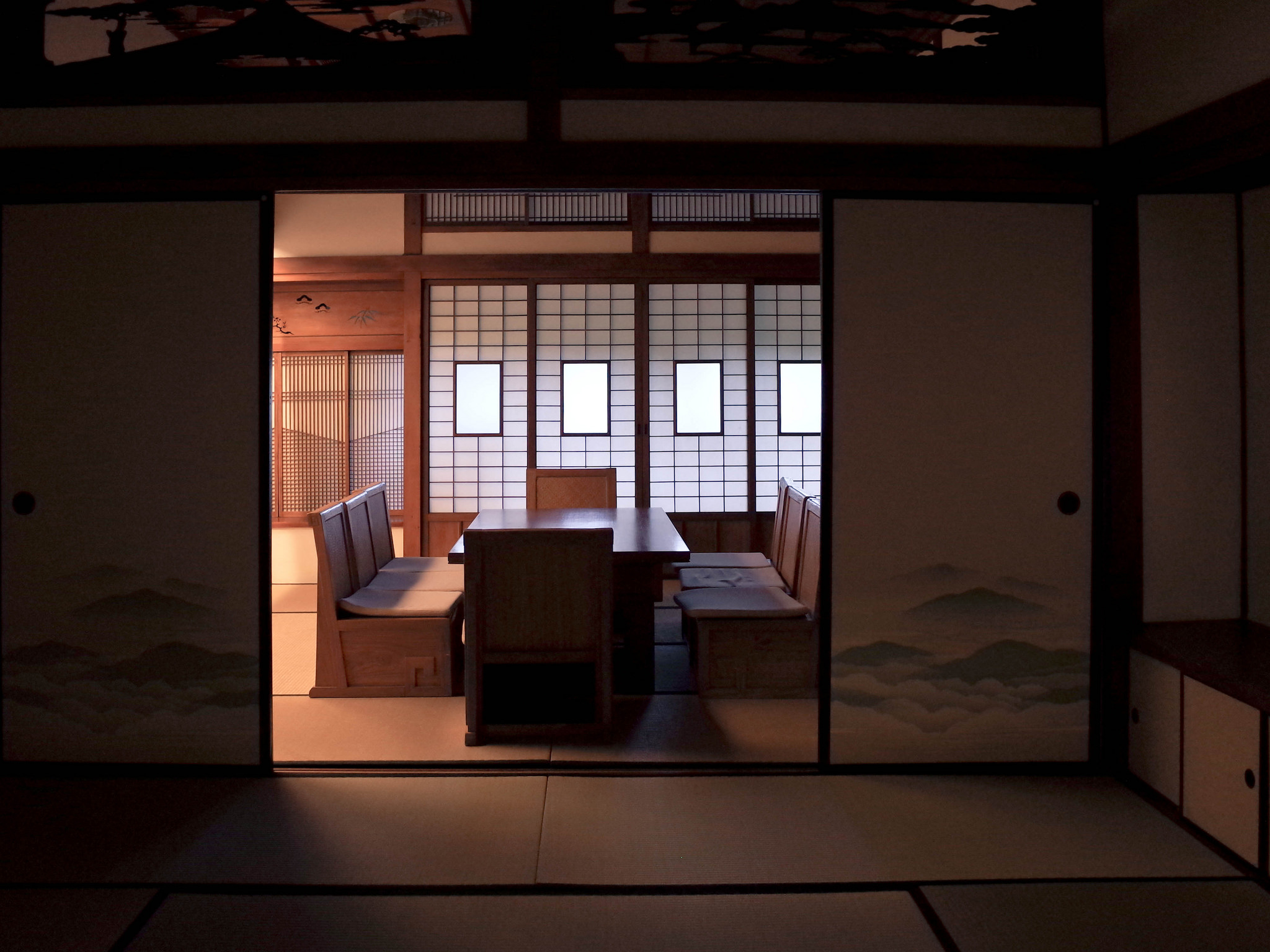
Shōji room

The Beitou Museum (traditional Chinese: 北投文物館; simplified Chinese: 北投文物馆; pinyin: Běitóu Wénwùguǎn) or sometimes called Taiwan Folk Arts Museum is a museum in Beitou District, Taipei, Taiwan.

== History ==
=== Empire of Japan ===
The museum building was originally built in 1921 as Kazan Hotel, the best hot spring hotel during the Japanese rule. During WWII, the hotel was used by Japanese Kamikaze squadron pilots, and the tatami room on the second floor was where they would have their last meal before the final flight of their lives.

=== Republic of China ===
After the handover of Taiwan to the Republic of China (ROC) in 1945, the ROC Ministry of Foreign Affairs took over the building and converted it into a dormitory. It was then later be given the name Old Moon Manor due to its use as the set for a traditional costume drama. The building was subsequently taken over by the museum founder and the Taiwan Folk Art and Antique House was established there, dedicated to preserving folk relics and aboriginal art from earlier times. The name was later changed to the current name Beitou Museum.

In 1998, the museum building was designated a historic site by the Taipei City Government. It is one of the largest freestanding wooden structures remaining in Taiwan from the Japanese colonial era. Restoration was made to the building starting 2002 for five years and the building was reopened to the public in 2008.

== Collections ==
- Taiwan Folk Art
- Taiwan Aboriginal Art
- Early Clothing and Textiles of Taiwan

== Transportation ==
The museum is accessible within walking distance east from Xinbeitou Station of the Taipei Metro.

== See also ==
- List of museums in Taiwan
