= Beitou District =

District in Taipei, Taiwan

Coordinates: 25.1167°N 121.5°E

Beitou 北投區 Hokutō
- District
- Beitou District
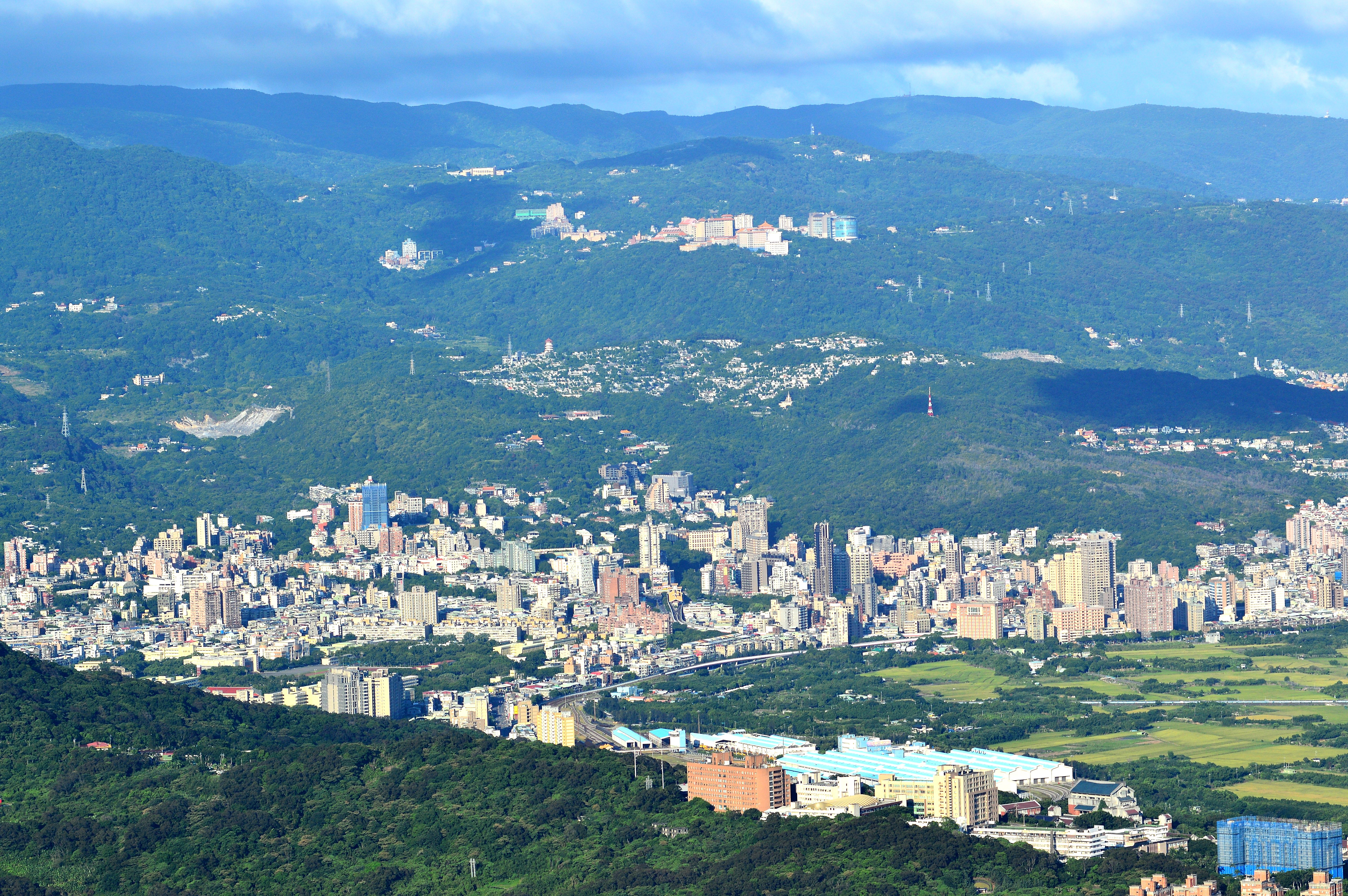
- View of Beitou from Mount Guanyin

- Country: Republic of China (Taiwan)
- Region: Northern Taipei
- Divisions: List: 42 villages; 825 neighborhoods

Area
  - Total: 56.8216 km^{2} (21.9389 sq mi)
  - Rank: Ranked 2nd of 12

Population (January 2023)
  - Total: 241,250
  - Rank: Ranked 5th of 12
  - Density: 4,245.7/km^{2} (10,996/sq mi)
- Postal code: 112
- Website: btdo.gov.taipei (in Chinese)

Beitou District
- Traditional Chinese: 北投區
Transcriptions
Standard Mandarin
- Hanyu Pinyin: Běitóu Qū
- Wade–Giles: Pei^{3}-t'ou^{2} Ch'ü^{1}
Southern Min
- Hokkien POJ: Pak-tâu-khu

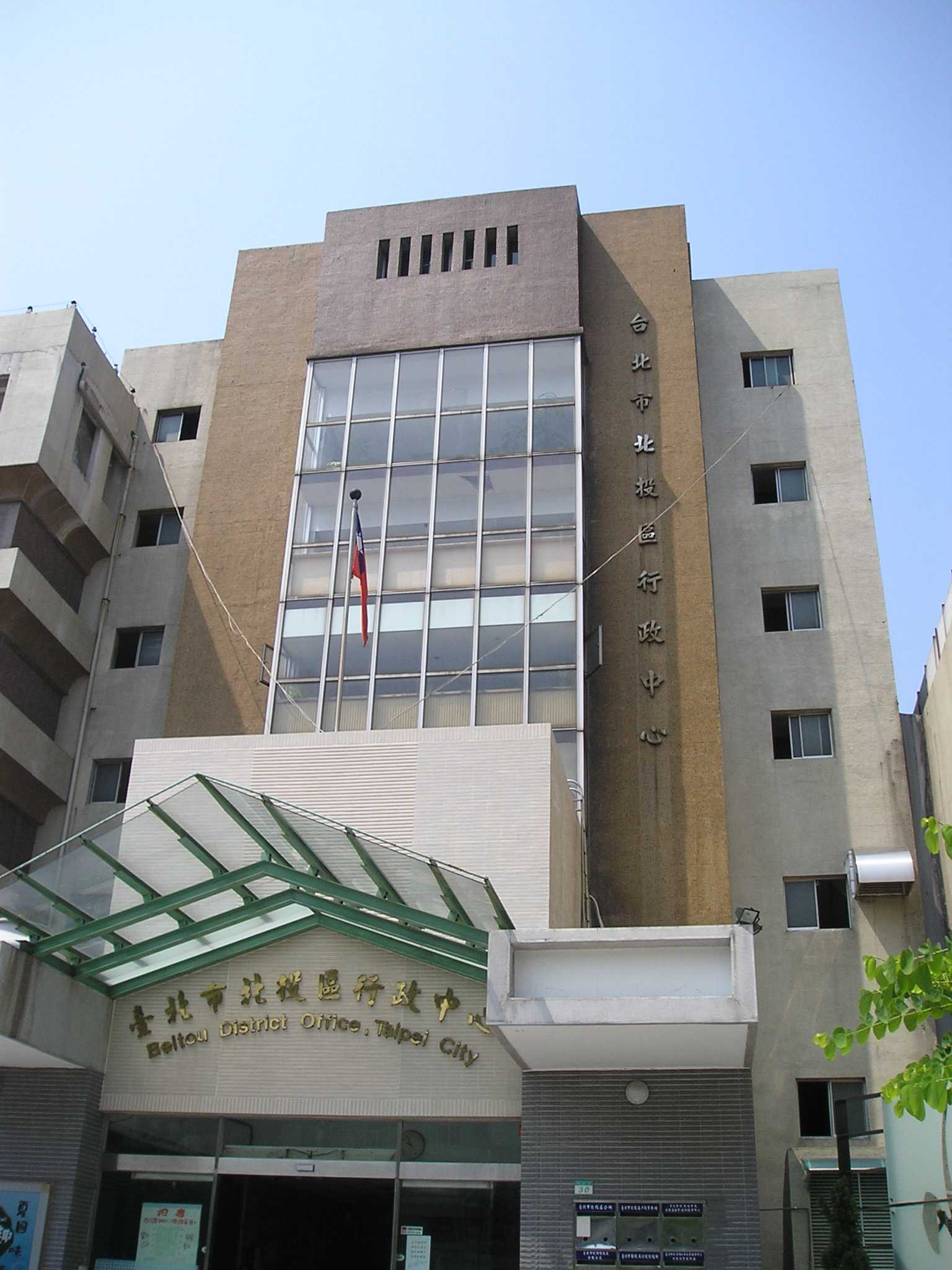
Beitou District office

Beitou District is the northernmost of the twelve districts of Taipei City, Taiwan. The historical spelling of the district is Peitou. The name originates from the Ketagalan word Kipatauw, meaning witch. Beitou is the most mountainous and highest of Taipei's districts, encompassing a meadow with rivers running through the valley which have abundant steam rising from them; the result of geothermal warming. The valley is often surrounded by mist shrouding the trees and grass. Beitou is famous for its hot springs. In March 2012, it was named one of the Top 10 Small Tourist Towns by the Tourism Bureau of Taiwan.

== History ==
The area's hot springs had long been enjoyed by the aboriginal people of Taiwan. Shortly before the Japanese period a German sulfur merchant established the first hot spring club in Beitou.

During early Japanese rule, Hokutō (Pak-tâu) was a village at the entrance of the well-known North Formosa sulfur district. Three Japanese extracting plants in this district produced about 200 short tons (180,000 kg) of sulfur monthly. The Japanese had already recognized the value of the village as a sanitary resort and constructed a Japanese inn with hot mineral baths provided by the sulfur springs. The hot springs have been developed to include aroma therapy, massage, acupuncture, hydrotherapy, and excellent cuisine which complement the entire spa experience. The mineral waters stream from the numerous geothermal vents that occur naturally in the region and are famous for their health benefits.

In 1896, Japanese anthropologist Inō Kanori surveyed the three Ketagalan settlements in the area, finding that the indigenous group had adopted the language and culture of the majority Han Chinese, although Ketagalan women still wore their hair in a traditional style. in his 1896 visit, Inō observed that most residents of the northernmost Ketagalan settlement had converted to Christianity. By the 1910s, the northernmost settlement had been disestablished to make extraction of white clay easier. The central Ketagalan settlement was cleared for a horse racing track in the late 1930s.

Between 1920 and 1941, Hokutō Village (北投庄) was governed under Shichisei District, Taihoku Prefecture. It was upgraded to a Hokutō Town in 1941.

After the handover of Taiwan from Japan to the Republic of China in 1945, it was renamed as Peitou urban township (北投鎮), belonging to Taipei County. Beginning in 1949, Peitou and Shilin were administered by the newly formed Yangmingshan Administrative Bureau. Both of them were merged into Taipei City on 1 July 1968 as districts. In 1974, Yangmingshan Administrative Bureau underwent restructuring and Beitou District was placed under direct jurisdiction of Taipei City.

== Economy ==
Aside from tourism Taiwanese electronics companies such as Asus as well as their former subsidiaries Pegatron and ASRock have their headquarters in Beitou. Additionally, the Taiwanese headquarters of Nvidia are planned to be constructed in Beitou

== Institutions ==
- National Research Institute of Chinese Medicine

== Education ==
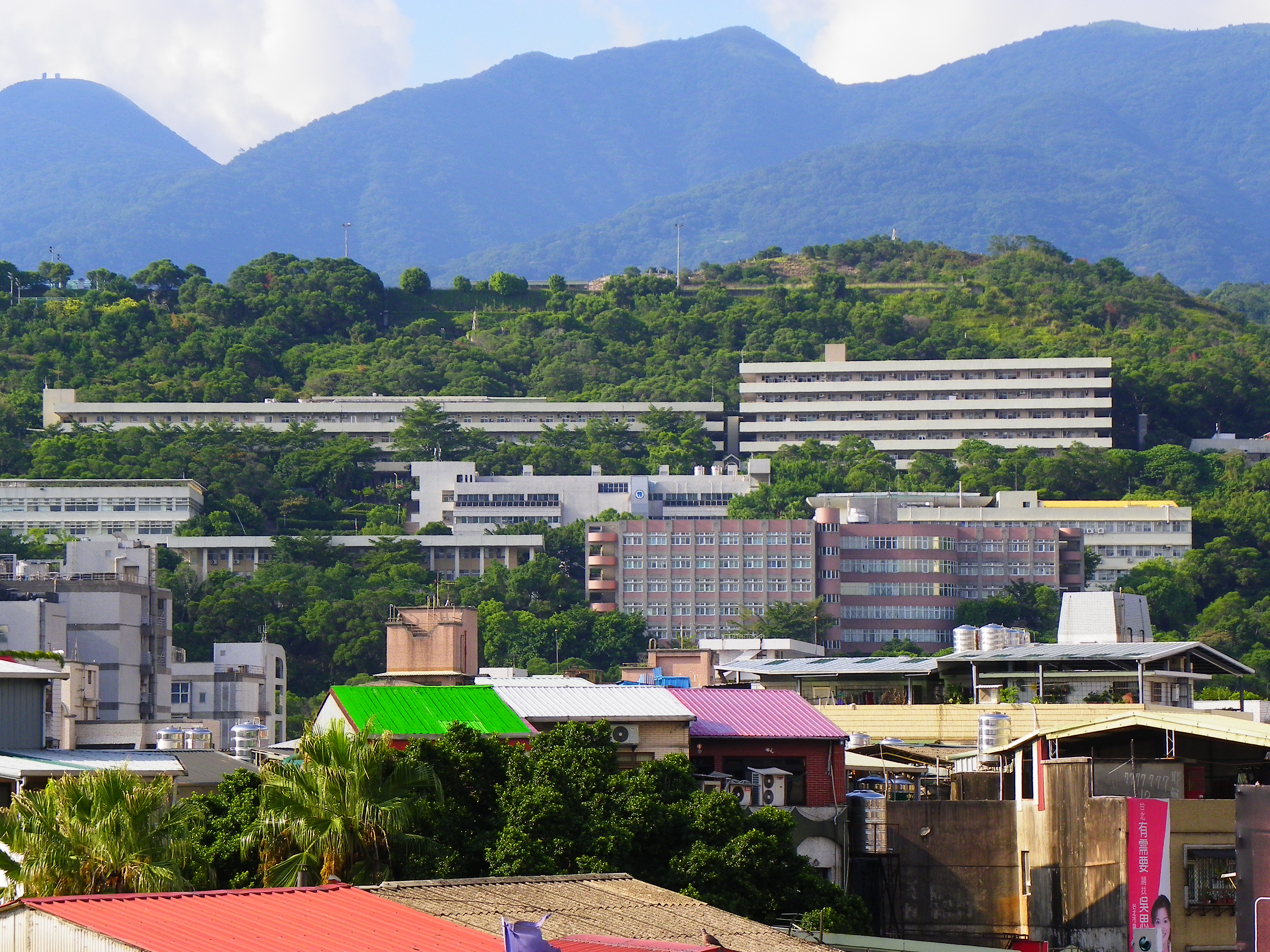
Yangming Campus of National Yang Ming Chiao Tung University

Universities and colleges:

- Dharma Drum Mountain Community University - Beitou Campus
- Fu Hsing Kang College
- National Defense University
- National Taipei University of Nursing and Health Science
- National Yang Ming Chiao Tung University
- Taipei City University of Science and Technology
- Taipei National University of the Arts

Junior and Senior High Schools:

- Taipei Municipal Zhong-zheng Senior High School
- Taipei Municipal Fuxing Senior High School
- Taipei Xin-Min Junior High School
- Taipei Beitou Junior High School
- Taipei Mingde Junior High School

== Infrastructure ==
- Beitou Refuse Incineration Plant
- Beitou-Shilin Technology Park

== Tourism ==
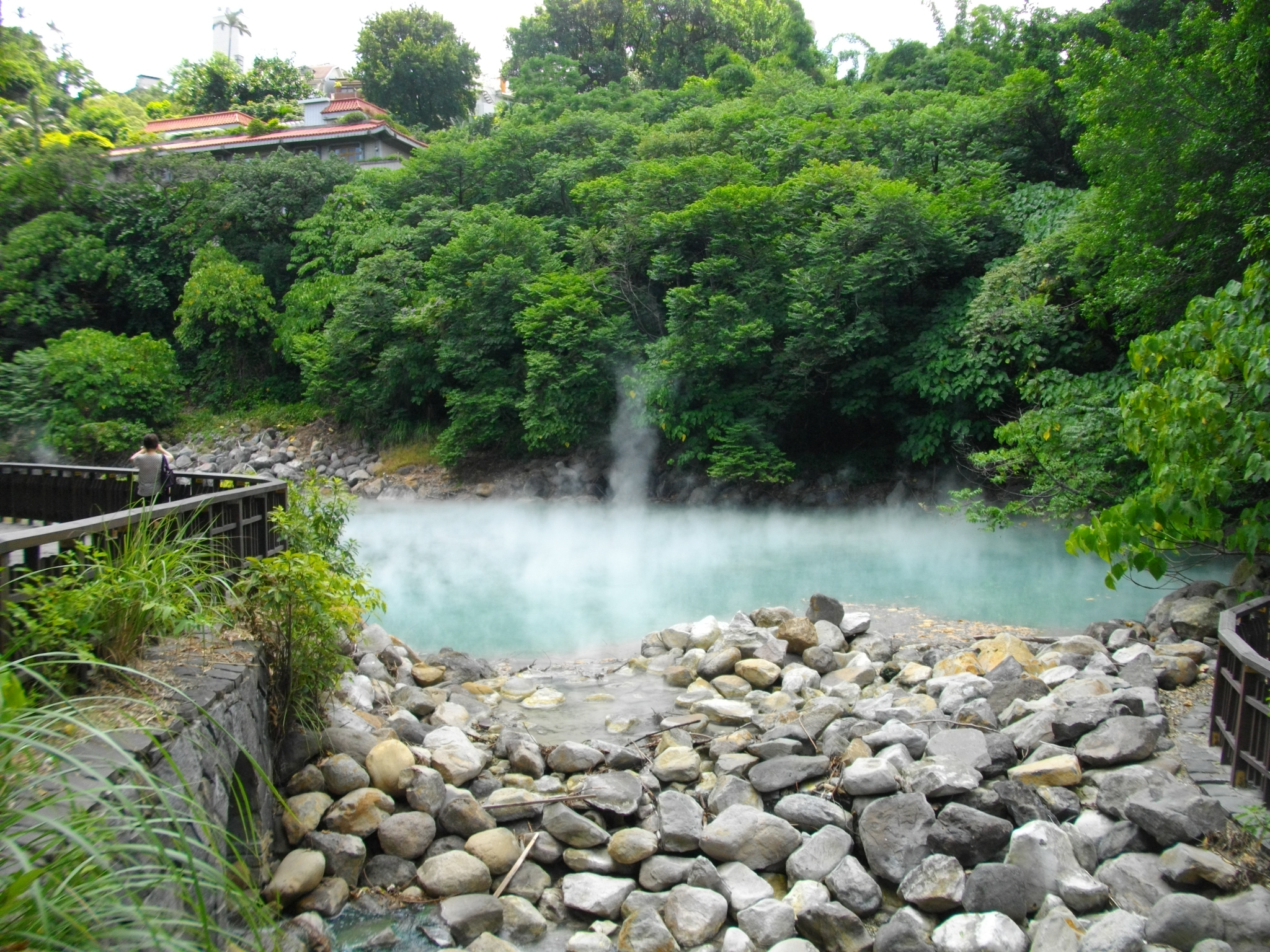
Hot Spring Valley in Beitou

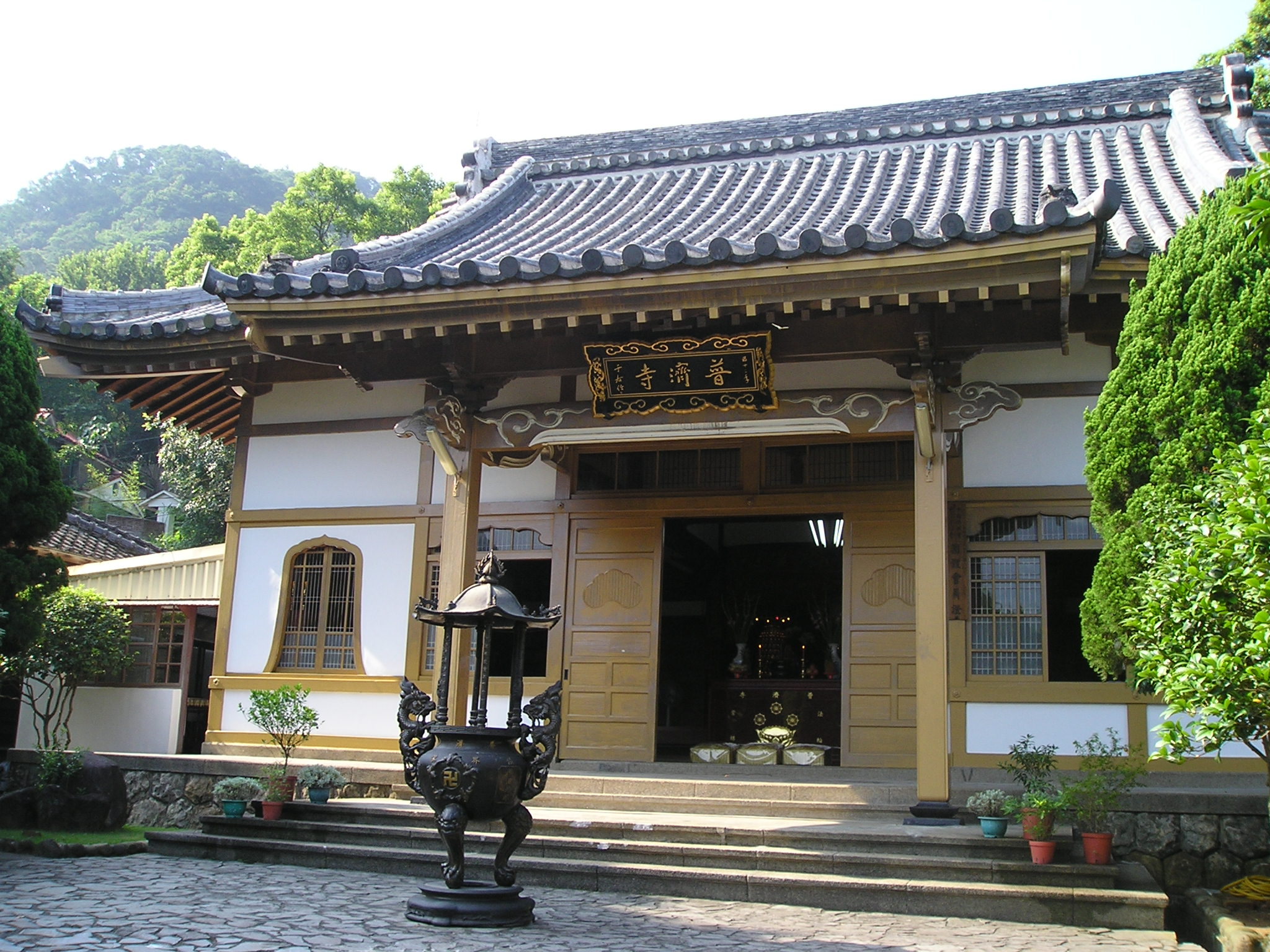
Puji Temple

Beitou has one of the largest concentrations of hot springs and spas in the world. Once a small park where locals used to relax in the hot springs, the Beitou Valley has evolved today to include over thirty resorts; a 20-minute subway ride north of Taipei takes you to Beitou. The resorts and spas are regarded by many locals and international tourists as among the most relaxing and rejuvenating places in the country. The spas consist of different degree pools (from cool to very hot) and minerals. However, residents of this district note that sulfuric fumes from the hot springs do ruin their electric appliances in the long term.

=== Tourist attractions ===
- Beitou Hot Spring Museum
- Beitou Museum
- Beitou Park
- Beitou Plum Garden
- Beitou Presbyterian Church
- Grass Mountain Chateau
- Guandu Nature Park
- Guandu Temple
- Hong-Gah Museum
- Ketagalan Culture Center
- Kuandu Museum of Fine Arts
- Lady Zhou's Memorial Gate
- Nung Chan Monastery
- Taipei Public Library Beitou Branch
- Thermal Valley
- Tittot Glass Art Museum
- Yangmingshan National Park
- Zhongxing Guesthouse
- Zhuzihu Ponlai Rice Foundation Seed Field Story House
- Hot Springs in Xin Beitou and Xingyi Road
- Beitou Cape: Lighthouse and seaside resort
- Puji Temple
- Zhongzheng Mountain

== Transportation ==
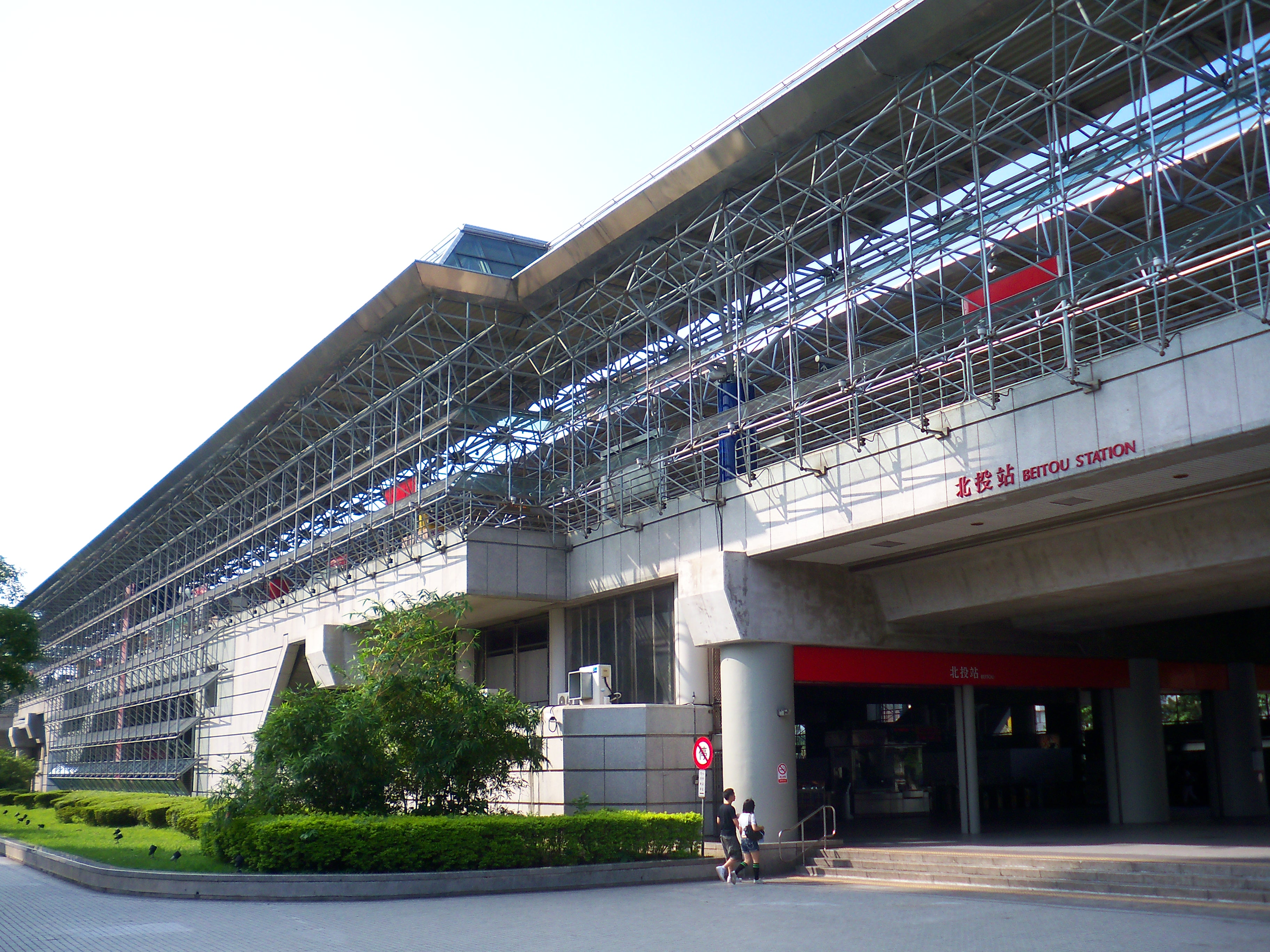
Beitou Station

The district is served by Beitou Station, Xinbeitou Station, Zhongyi Station, Qiyan Station, Fuxinggang Station, Guandu Station, Qilian Station, Mingde Station and Shipai Station of the Taipei Metro.

== Notable people ==
- Ashin – singer, songwriter and author
- Gingle Wang – actress and writer
- Tai Chih-yuan – comedian, actor and show host
- Chen Ming-chang – folk/pop singer-songwriter

== See also ==
- Shipai, Taipei
