= Guanziling Hot Spring =

Hot spring in Baihe, Tainan, Taiwan

- 關子嶺溫泉
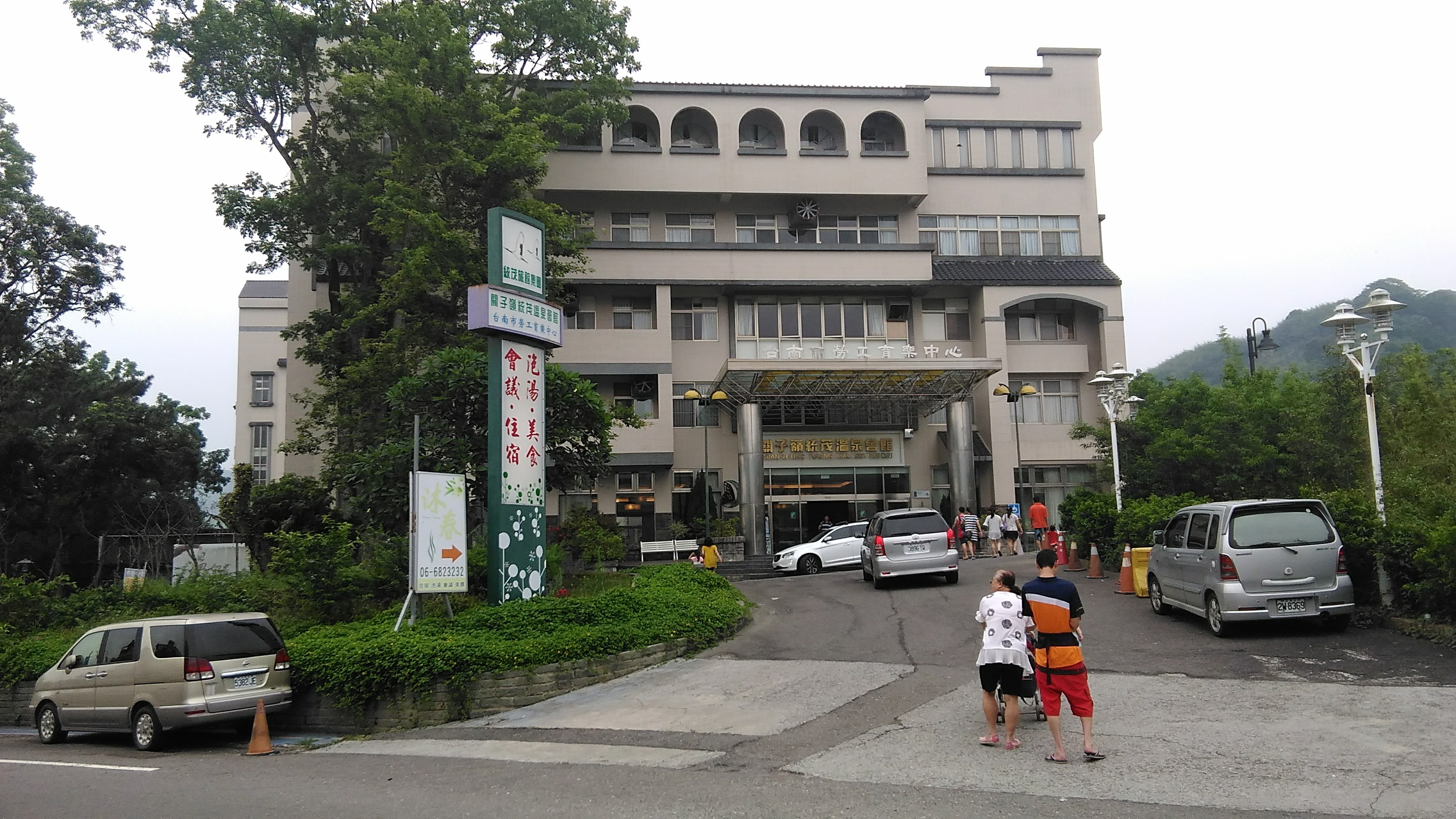

- Location within Tainan
- Interactive map of Guanziling Hot Spring
- Location: Baihe, Tainan, Taiwan
- Coordinates: 23°20′0″N 120°30′0″E
- Elevation: 270 m (890 ft)
- Type: hot spring

Guanziling Hot Spring (Chinese: 關子嶺溫泉; pinyin: Guānzilǐng Wēnquán; Wade–Giles: Kuan^{1}-tzu^{1}-ling^{3}) is a hot spring in Baihe District, Tainan, Taiwan. The hot spring was discovered by the Japanese troops in the area and it was named Taiwan's No. 1 Hot Spring in 1920. The hot spring is located at an altitude of 270 meters above sea level. This rare spring releases methane, which has been burning constantly for around three centuries.

== Transportation ==
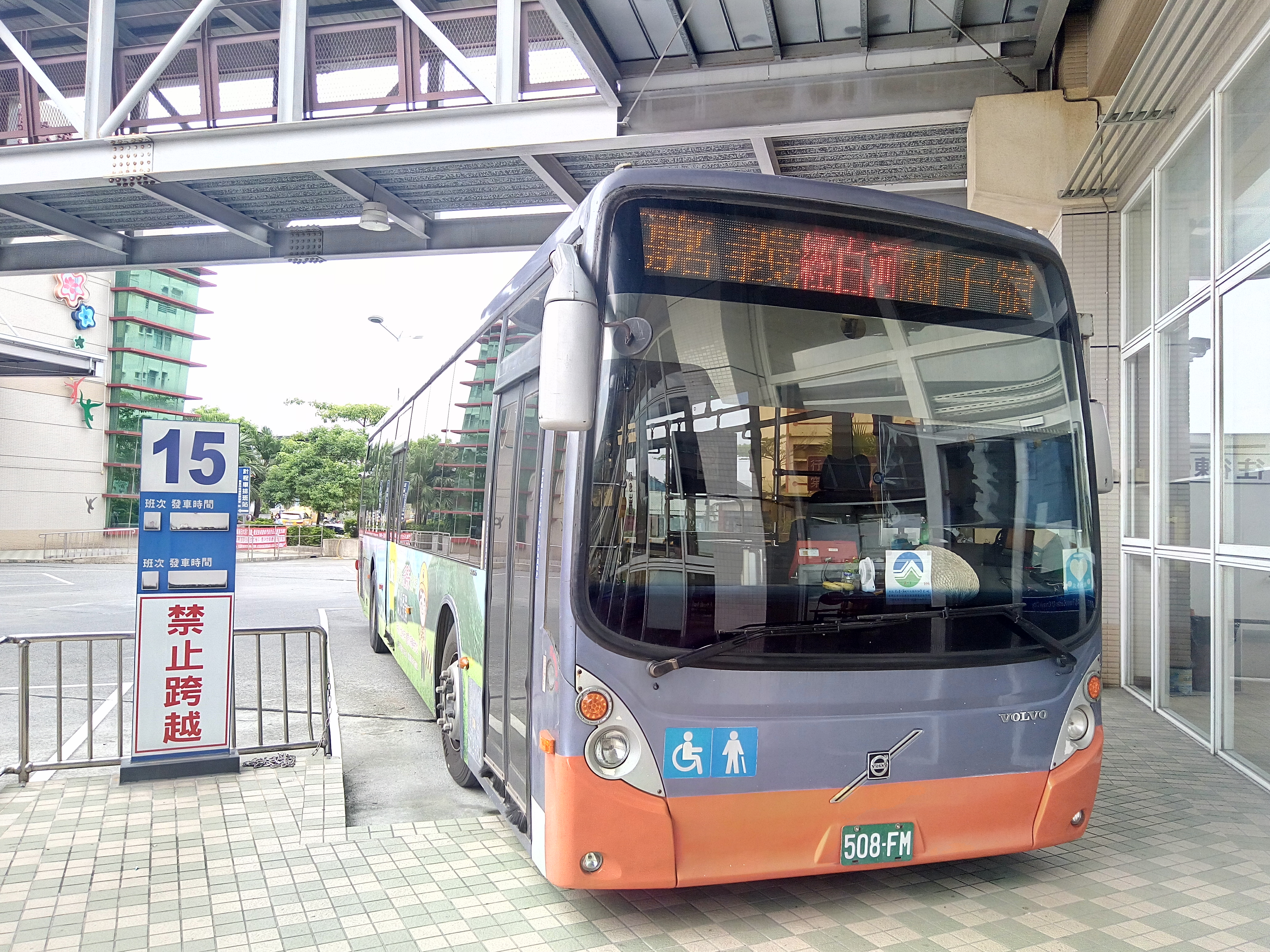
Chiayi Bus 7214 to Guanzihling at platform15 of Transit Center of Chiayi City

- Chaiyi Bus
  - 【7214】 Chiayi Train Station－Guanzihling
- Xinging Bus
  - 【33】 HSR Chiayi Station－Baihe Bus Station－Guanzihling
  - 【Dongshan Coffee】 Guanzihling－Henglu Rest Area
  - 【Y12】 Xinying Train Station－Baihe Bus Station－Guanzihling
  - 【Y12-2】 Guanzihling－Guanzihling（Circular Line）
  - 【Y13】 Baihe Bus Station－Guanzihling－Nanliao－Siangong Temple

== See also ==
- Taiwanese hot springs
