= Zhaori Hot Spring =

Hot spring in Lüdao, Taitung County, Taiwan

- 朝日溫泉
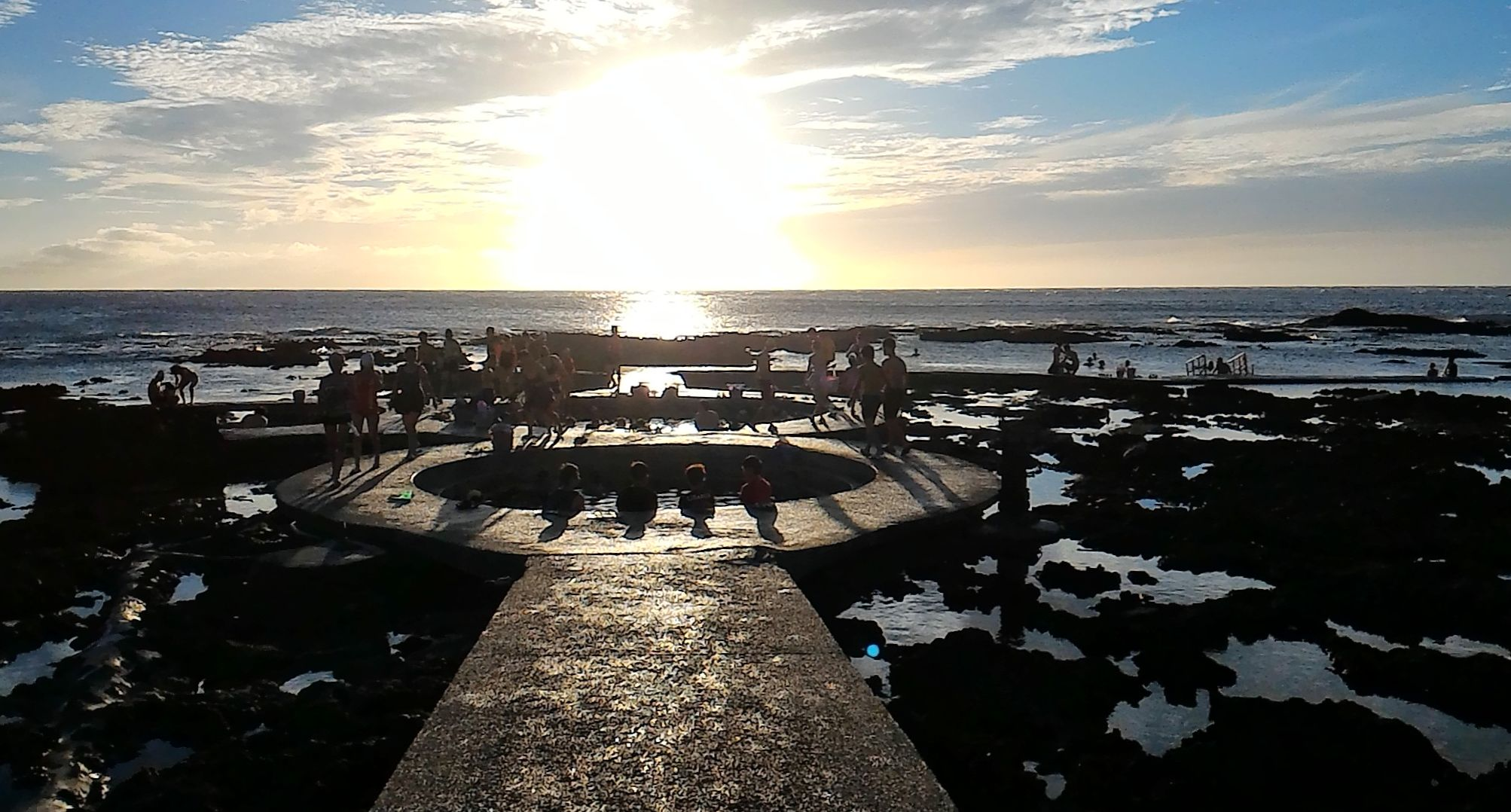

- Location within Taitung County
- Interactive map of Zhaori Hot Spring
- Location: Lüdao, Taitung County, Taiwan
- Coordinates: 22°38′12.5″N 121°30′16.6″E
- Type: saltwater hot spring
- Temperature: 60–70 °C (140–158 °F)

The Zhaori Hot Spring (traditional Chinese: 朝日溫泉; simplified Chinese: 朝日温泉; pinyin: Zhāorì Wēnquán) is a hot spring in Green Island, Taitung County, Taiwan.

== History ==
During the Japanese rule of Taiwan, the hot spring was named Asahi Hot Spring.

== Geology ==
The water spring is the only one of three saltwater hot springs in the world. The water source of the hot spring comes from the sea and underwater of the island heated by lava. The temperature of the hot spring ranges between 60 and 70°C.

== Architecture ==
The hot spring consists of three open-air pools, a spa pool and five terrace-like pools.

== See also ==
- List of tourist attractions in Taiwan
- Taiwanese hot springs
