= Beitou Plum Garden =

Former residence in Beitou, Taipei, Taiwan

- 北投梅庭
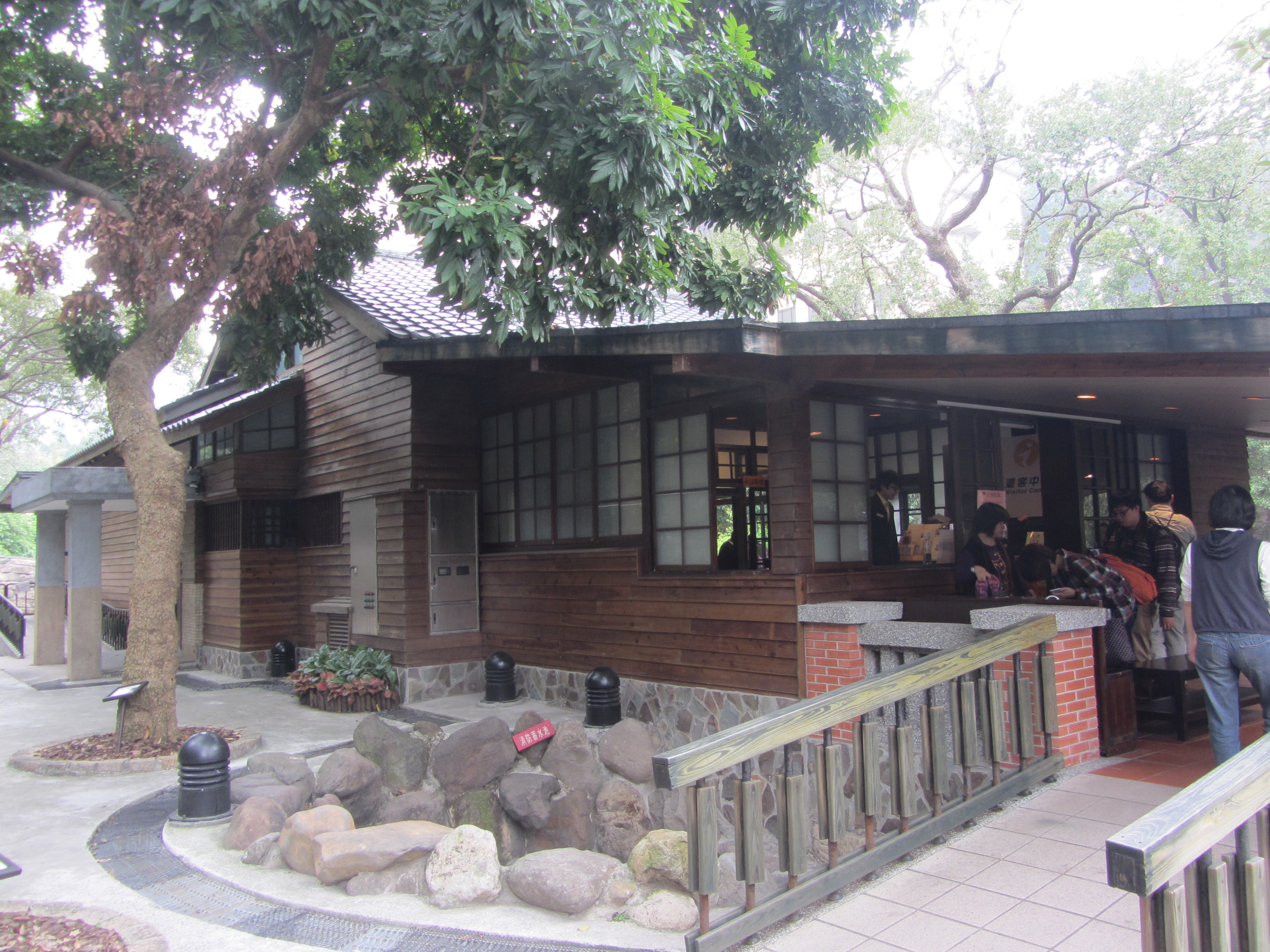
- Interactive map of the Beitou Plum Garden area

General information
- Type: former residence
- Architectural style: Japanese, Western
- Location: Beitou, Taipei, Taiwan
- Coordinates: 25°8′13.3″N 121°30′31.2″E
- Completed: 1930s
- Opened: 2010
- Renovated: January-June 2015

Technical details
- Floor count: 2

Beitou Plum Garden

Open veranda of the Beitou Plum Garden

Interior of the Beitou Plum Garden

The Beitou Plum Garden (Chinese: 北投梅庭; pinyin: Běitóu Méitíng) is a museum in the former residence of calligrapher Yu Youren in Beitou District, Taipei, Taiwan.

== History ==
The building was constructed in the late 1930s as the summer getaway home of calligrapher Yu Youren. In 2006, the building was listed as a historical site by the Taipei City Government and was opened to the public in 2010. In 2015, the building was closed for renovation from January until 27 June.

== Architecture ==
The wooden building was constructed using a mixture of Japanese and Western architectural styles with two floors. The ground floor was constructed as an air raid shelter which is heavily shielded with steel rods and reinforced concrete. Most of the floors uses deep polished wooden boards.

== Exhibitions ==
The building houses various calligraphy works done by Yu Youren and history of local architecture. It also regularly host various musical events.

== Transportation ==
The building is accessible within walking distance east of Xinbeitou Station of Taipei Metro.

== See also ==
- List of tourist attractions in Taiwan
