= Beitou Park =

Park in Beitou, Taipei, Taiwan

- 北投公園
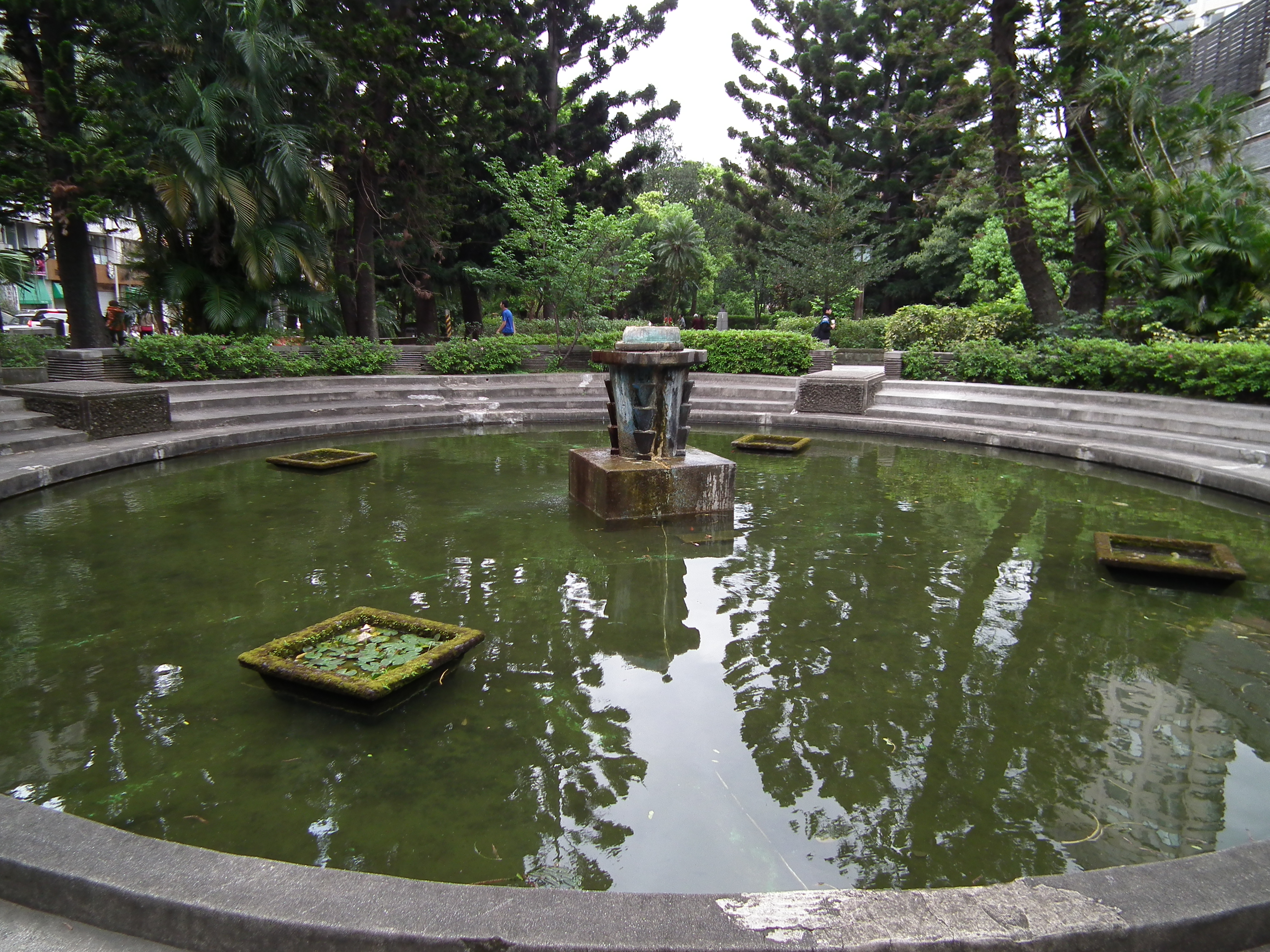
- Interactive map of Beitou Park
- Type: park
- Location: Beitou, Taipei, Taiwan
- Coordinates: 25°08′11.4″N 121°30′22.8″E
- Area: 6 hectares (15 acres)
- Established: 1913
- Public transit: Xinbeitou Station

The Beitou Park (traditional Chinese: 北投公園; simplified Chinese: 北投公园; pinyin: Běitóu Gōngyuán) is a park in Beitou District, Taipei, Taiwan.

== History ==
The park was created in 1913 during the Japanese rule of Taiwan, making it the third oldest park in Taipei and the first hot spring park on the island. It was constructed to welcome the visit of Prince Hirohito to Taiwan. The construction included the overhaul works of the area around it into the park. Soon after, a water fountain was constructed at the center of the park. Years later, the downspouts were removed from the park but was then restored in 2013 by the Taipei City Government.

== Geography ==
The park spans over an area of six hectares [14.8 acres] and is located along the Beitou River. The park features the Beitou Hot Spring Museum and Taipei Public Library Beitou Branch. It also has five small waterfalls with hot springs.

== Transportation ==
The park is accessible within walking distance east of Xinbeitou Station of Taipei Metro.

== See also ==
- List of parks in Taiwan
