= National Taipei University of Nursing and Health Science =

University in Beitou, Taipei, Taiwan

National Taipei University of Nursing and Health Sciences
- 國立臺北護理健康大學
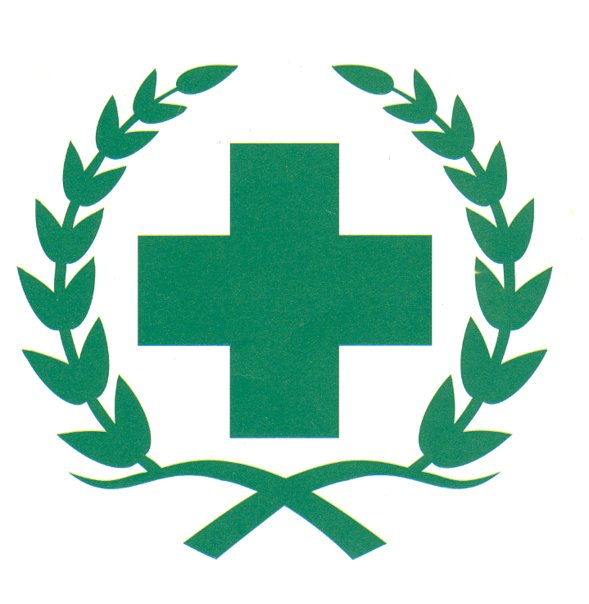
- Motto: 樂育親仁(Pe̍h-ōe-jī: Lo̍k-io̍k Chhin-jîn)
- Type: Public
- Established: 1954 (as Taiwan Provincial Junior College of Nursing); August 2010 (as NTUNHS)
- Location: Beitou, Taipei, Taiwan; 25°07′04.2″N 121°31′11.6″E
- Website: Official website

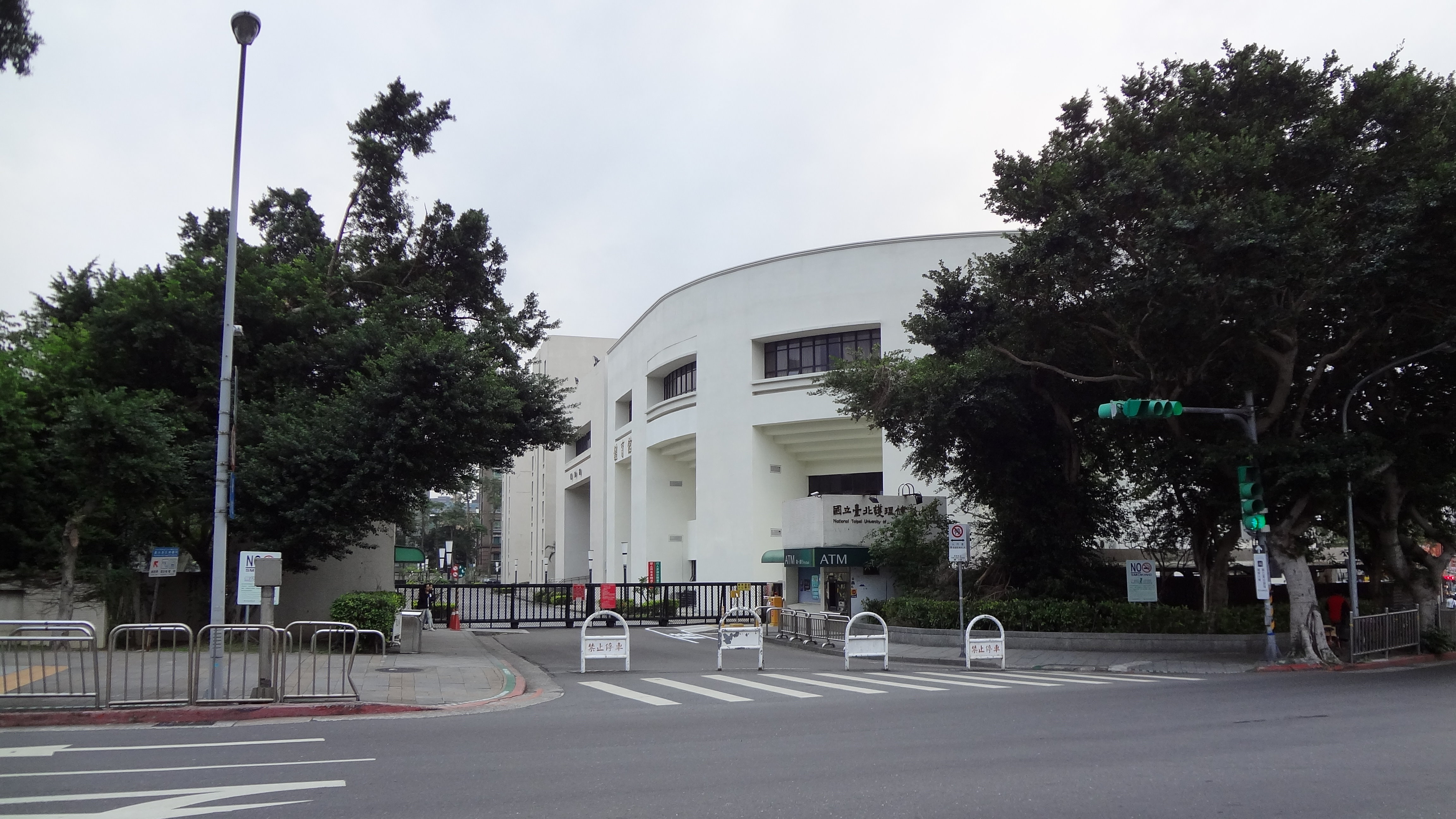
National Taipei University of Nursing and Health Sciences

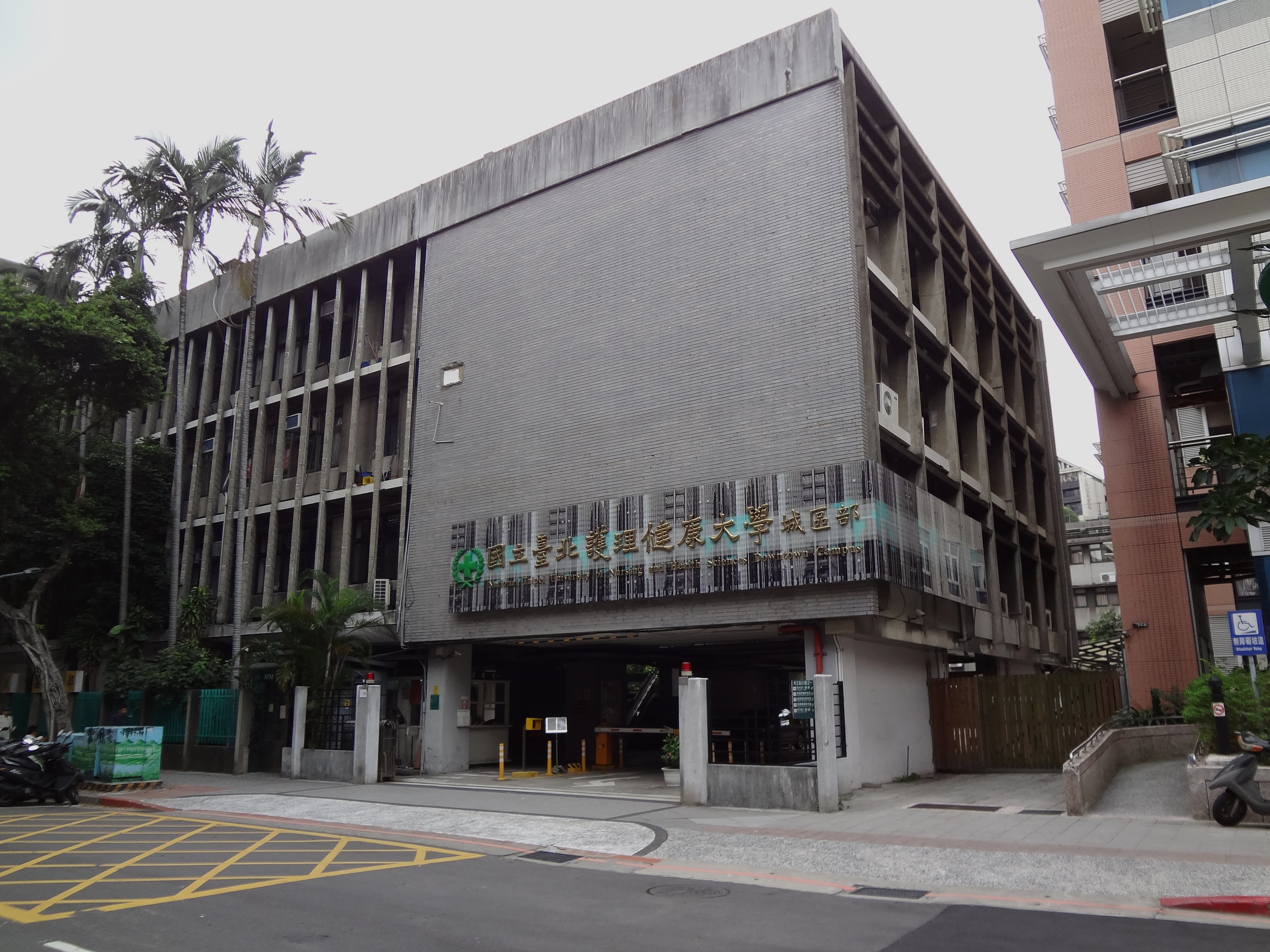
NTUNHS Downtown Campus

The National Taipei University of Nursing and Health Sciences (Chinese: 國立臺北護理健康大學; Pe̍h-ōe-jī: Kok-li̍p Tâi-pak Hō͘-lí Kiān-khong Tāi-ha̍k) is a public Medical School located in Beitou District, Taipei, Taiwan.

== History ==
Founded in 1954 as Taiwan Provincial Junior College of Nursing, National Taipei University of Nursing and Health Sciences (NTUNHS) has undergone various transformations in its history. In 1963, the college consolidated with Taipei Senior Vocational School of Medicine, and was renamed Taiwan Provincial Vocational School of Nursing and Midwifery, a five-year junior college. Reformed again from a state-run institution in 1994, the school changed its name to National Taipei College of Nursing. This title continued until August 2010, when the School was formally renamed National Taipei University of Nursing and Health Sciences. Since 1994, NTUNHS has established the Department of Medical & Nursing Management and the Department of Infant & Child Care. In 1999, NTUNHS started its master's program in Nursing and Health Care Management, Long-Term care, Nursing-Midwifery, Health Allied Education, and Speech & Hearing Disorders and Sciences. In 2002, NTUNHS further established the Department of Exercise & Health Science and Department of Information Management. Upon approval by the Ministry of Education in 2005, NTUNHS established a doctoral program in nursing; this was the first doctoral nursing program in the nation provided by a technological and vocational school. In 2007, the Department of Nursing began recruiting international students to its master's program, inaugurating its English-based international nursing program at the school. In August 2010, NTUNHS was formally renamed the National Taipei University of Nursing and Health Sciences, comprising the College of Nursing, College of Healthcare Administration and Management, College of Human Development and Health, and Center of General Education. At present, NTUNHS is made up of three colleges, including five departments, twelve graduate programs, and one center.

== Campus ==
Main Campus
Address: No. 365, Ming-te Road, Beitou District, Taipei, Taiwan Zipcode 112303

Downtown Campus
Address: No. 89, Neijiang Street, Wanhua District, Taipei, Taiwan

== School ==
- College of Nursing
- College of Health Technology
- College of Human Development and Health

== Bachelor's Degree ==
=== Under the College of Nursing ===
- Nursing
- Gerontologist Health Care
- Nurse-Midwifery and Women Health
- Allied Health Education and Digital Learning

=== Under the College of Health Technology ===
- Speech Pathology and Audiology
- Health Care Management
- Information Management
- Long-Term Care
- Healthcare Management
- Leisure Industry and Health Promotion

=== Under the College of Human Development and Health ===
- Thanatology and Health Counseling
- Infant and Child Care
- Exercise and Health Science

== Partner University ==
=== Africa ===
- Burkina Faso：Ecole Nacionale De Sante Publique of Burkina Faso

=== North America ===
- United States: University of Southern California
- United States: San Diego State University
- United States: University of Maryland, College Park
- United States: University of the Incarnate Word
- United States: University of Washington
- United States: Southern California University of Health Sciences
- United States: University of Miami
- United States: University of Michigan–Flint
- United States: Oklahoma City University
- United States: Eastern Michigan University

=== Asia ===
- Singapore: National University of Singapore
- South Korea: Seoul Women's College of Nursing
- China: Beijing University of Chinese Medicine
- Malaysia: Universiti Tunku Abdul Rahman
- Mongolia: The Global Leadership University
- Mongolia: Govi-Altai school of Health Sciences University of Mongolia
- Mongolia: Otoch Manramba University
- Thailand: College of Asian Scholars
- Thailand: Chiang Mai University
- Vietnam: Hue University of Medicine and Pharmacy
- Vietnam: Tra Vinh University
- Indonesia: Aisyiyah Health Sciences College of Indonesia
- Indonesia: Muhammadiyah University of Surakarta
- Indonesia: Muhammadiyah Midwifery Academy of Cirebon
- Indonesia: University of Muhammadiyah Purwokerto
- Indonesia: University Muhammadiyah of Jakarta
- Indonesia: Universitas Muhammadiyah Semarang
- Indonesia: Muhammadiyah University of West Sumatra
- Indonesia: Muhammadiyah Health Sciences Institute of Gombong
- Indonesia: University of Muhammadiyah of Tangerang
- Indonesia: Aisyiyah Midwifery Academy of Banten
- Indonesia: Aisyiyah Health Sciences College of Surakarta
- Indonesia: Aisyiyah Midwifery Academy of Pontianak
- Indonesia: Prima Nusantara Health College, Bukit Tinggi
- Indonesia: Dehasen Health Sciences College, Bengkulu, Sumatera
- Indonesia: Health Sciences College of Indonesia, Padang, Sumatera
- Bahrain: Royal College of Surgeons in Ireland–Medical University of Bahrain

=== Europe ===
- United Kingdom: Ulster University
- United Kingdom: Queen's University Belfast
- United Kingdom: University of Bedfordshire
- Czech Republic: University of Ostrava

=== Oceania ===
- Australia: University of Canberra
- Australia: Queensland University of Technology
- Australia: Griffith University
- Australia: Deakin University
- New Zealand: Manukau Institute of Technology
- New Zealand: University of Auckland

== See also ==
- List of universities in Taiwan
