= Taipei Municipal Zhong-zheng Senior High School =

Coordinates: 25°06′15.75″N 121°30′59.55″E

- 臺北市立中正高級中學
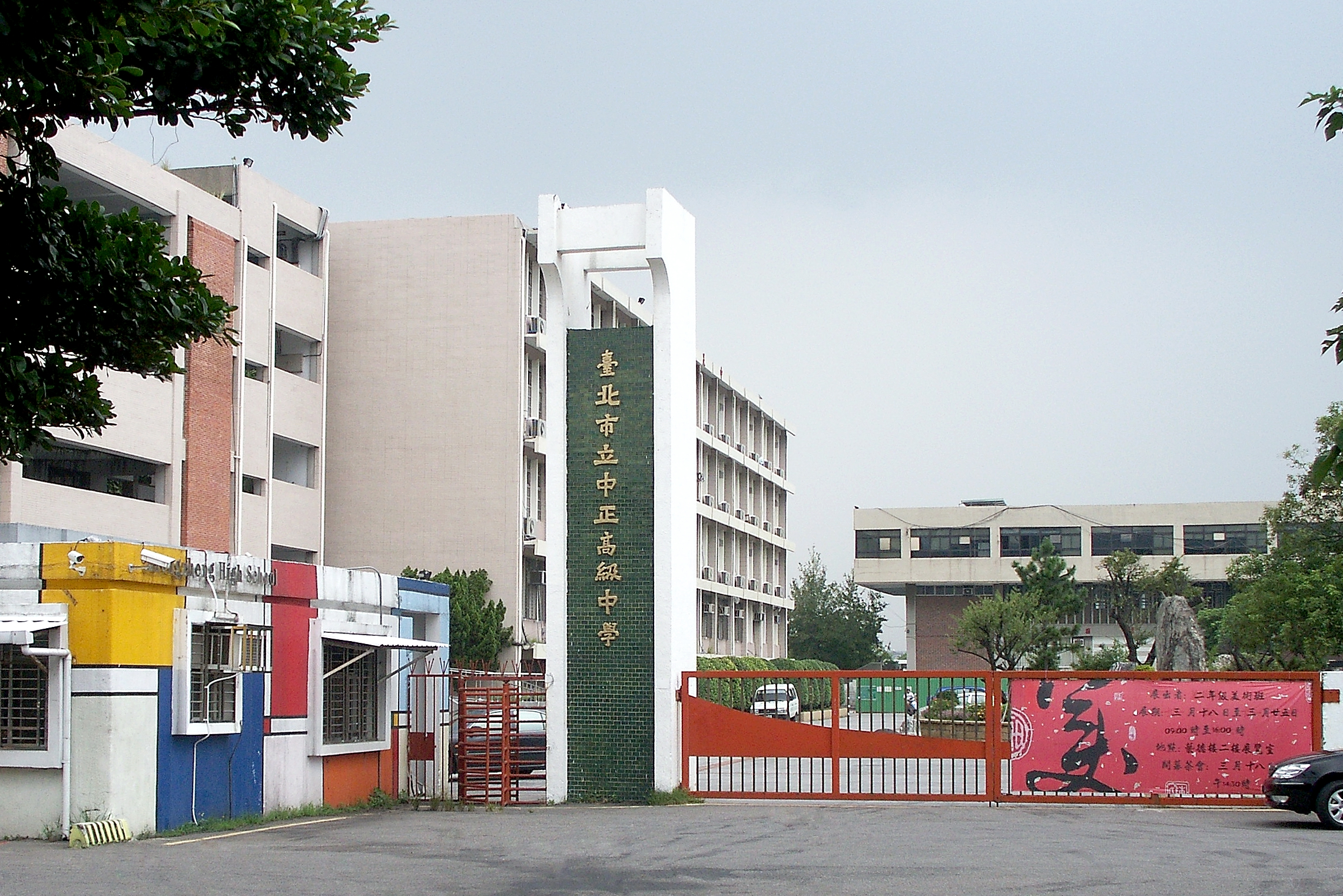

Location
- No.77 Wunlin N. Rd., Beitou District, Taipei City, Taiwan, R.O.C. 11287

Information
- Type: Municipal High School
- Motto: 公 誠 弘 毅
- Established: 1945
- School district: Beitou District, Taipei City, Taiwan
- Campus Area: 76,560 square meters
- Website: www.ccsh.tp.edu.tw

Zhong-zheng Senior High School (ZZSH or CCSH; Chinese: 臺北市立中正高中; Hanyu Pinyin: Táiběi Shìlì Zhōngzhèng Gāozhōng; Tongyong Pinyin: taibei shihli jhong jheng gaojhong; Wade–Giles: t'aipei shihli chung cheng kaochung) is a public 3-year high school in Taipei City, Taiwan, Republic of China.

== History ==
Taipei Municipal Zhong-zheng Senior High School, formerly the Taipei County Shih-lin Junior High School, was established in 1945 and began to enroll new students the next year. The first principal was Mr. Su Jin-zhuan, and after the tenures of the following principals, Mr. Ho Jiang-shan, Mr. Hsieh Da-huang and Ms. Shao Meng-lan, the school expanded and enjoyed a growing reputation.

In 1964, the senior high school was added on a trial basis and with good results, this school was converted into a complete high school in 1966, under the jurisdiction of the Yangmingshan Management Bureau. In 1968, the Yangmingshan Management Bureau was formally taken over by the Taipei City Government. In July, this school was separated into two schools—Taipei Municipal Shih-lin Senior High School and Junior High School. By order of the government, the campus was assigned as the junior high school in 1972 and the senior high school was moved to the present site, Shi-pai, on February 25, 1975.

In August 1975, this school was renamed as Taipei Municipal Zhong-zheng Senior High School. In the same year, Ms. Shao Meng-lan announced her retirement. After Ms. Shao were Mr. Yu Wei-lu, Ms. Ding Ya-wen and Mr. Lin Shi-de. The current principal, Mr. Liu Zheng-ming, assumed office in August 2003.

Taipei Municipal Zhong-zheng Senior High School was recognised as an International Baccalaureate World School to offer the Diploma Programme on 28 April 2023.

Covering a campus of about 23,000 pings, this school was completed with all the necessary facilities in 1975. With the completion of Yi-teh Building in 1987, artistic education was included to help students of talent for arts, music and dancing.

== Location ==
Taipei Municipal Zhong-zheng Senior High School is located in the northwest of the Taipei Basin.

== See also ==
- Education in Taiwan
