= Hill Valley =

Hill Valley may refer to:

- Hill Valley (Back to the Future), the fictional town in the Back to the Future film series
- Hill Valley, the fictional town in the animated cartoon series The Oblongs
- Hill Valley Gardens, the fictional home town of the traveling family in the stop-motion series Glenn Martin, DDS
- Red Hill Valley, a valley in eastern and south-eastern Hamilton, Ontario, Canada
- Red Hill Valley Parkway, a municipal expressway running through Hamilton, Ontario, Canada
