= Zhongzheng Mountain =

Mountain in Taiwan

Coordinates: 25°09′28″N 121°30′57″E

Zhongzheng Mountain (Traditional Chinese: 中正山), originally named Mituo Mountain and also known as Shiba Fen Mountain or Daganlin Mountain, is a peak in the northern part of the Taipei Basin within the Datun Volcano Group in Taiwan. With an elevation of 646 meters, it is located in Beitou District, Taipei City, within the Yangmingshan National Park. Formed by volcanic rocks on the southern side of Mt. Datun, it is referred to as Maitreya Mountain by the abbot of Fahua Temple at the foot of the mountain.

In the early 1950s, during the early years of the Nationalist government in Taiwan, the mountain was renamed Zhongzheng Ridge to celebrate the birthday of President Chiang Kai-shek. Later, it was changed to Zhongzheng Mountain. The Kuomintang (KMT) and its affiliated organizations, starting from the 1950s, established birthday altars on the mountain on President Chiang Kai-shek's birthday. They organized mass ascents for the "Birthday Ascent," and in the 1960s, they expanded it to a "Ten Thousand People Ascent" symbolizing boundless longevity. Participants chanted praises to the "World Renowned Leader" and the "Savior of the Nation," shouting cheers in his honor. Even after his passing, annual "Memorial Ascents" continued for over a decade.

In 1956, the Forestry Bureau, in collaboration with the Presidential Office, carried out afforestation with the image of the characters "中正" (Zhongzheng) on the southern slope of the mountain facing the direction of Taipei City. Each character was about one hundred meters wide and visible from Beitou City when the weather was clear, serving as a landmark for Beitou. However, by the 1990s, the characters became increasingly indistinct, and by 2003, aerial photos showed that they were difficult to recognize. This deterioration was attributed to the infestation of pine wood nematodes over the years and the passing of volunteers who had been pruning the trees since 2007. As of now, the characters are no longer discernible.
