= ROCS Chung Cheng =

ROCS Chung Cheng (Chinese: 中正) may refer to one of the following ships of the Republic of China Navy, all three named after President Chiang Kai-shek (formal name Chiang Chung-cheng):

- ROCS Chung Cheng (LST-224), the former American LST-542-class tank landing ship USS Lafayette County (LST-859); acquired by the Republic of China Navy in 1958; fate unknown
- ROCS Chung Cheng (LSD-191) (1960), the former American Ashland-class dock landing ship USS White Marsh (LSD-8); acquired by the Republic of China Navy in 1960; scrapped, 1985
- ROCS Chung Cheng (LSD-191) (1984), the former American Casa Grande-class dock landing ship USS Comstock (LSD-19); acquired by the Republic of China Navy in October 1984 and sunk as an artificial reef in 2015
