= Heil Valley =

Valley in Antarctica

Heil Valley (77°11′38″S 160°04′23″E) is an ice-free valley, 1.5 nautical miles (2.8 km) long, that indents the northern part of V-shaped Mount Littlepage in the Head Mountains of Victoria Land. Named by the Advisory Committee on Antarctic Names in 2007 after Joseph J. Heil III, supervisor of the communications center at McMurdo Station for 11 austral summers from 1993; he served 18 summers and two winters in support of the United States Antarctic Program from 1987 to 2007.
