= Beitou Hot Spring Museum =

Museum in Beitou, Taipei, Taiwan

- 北投溫泉博物館
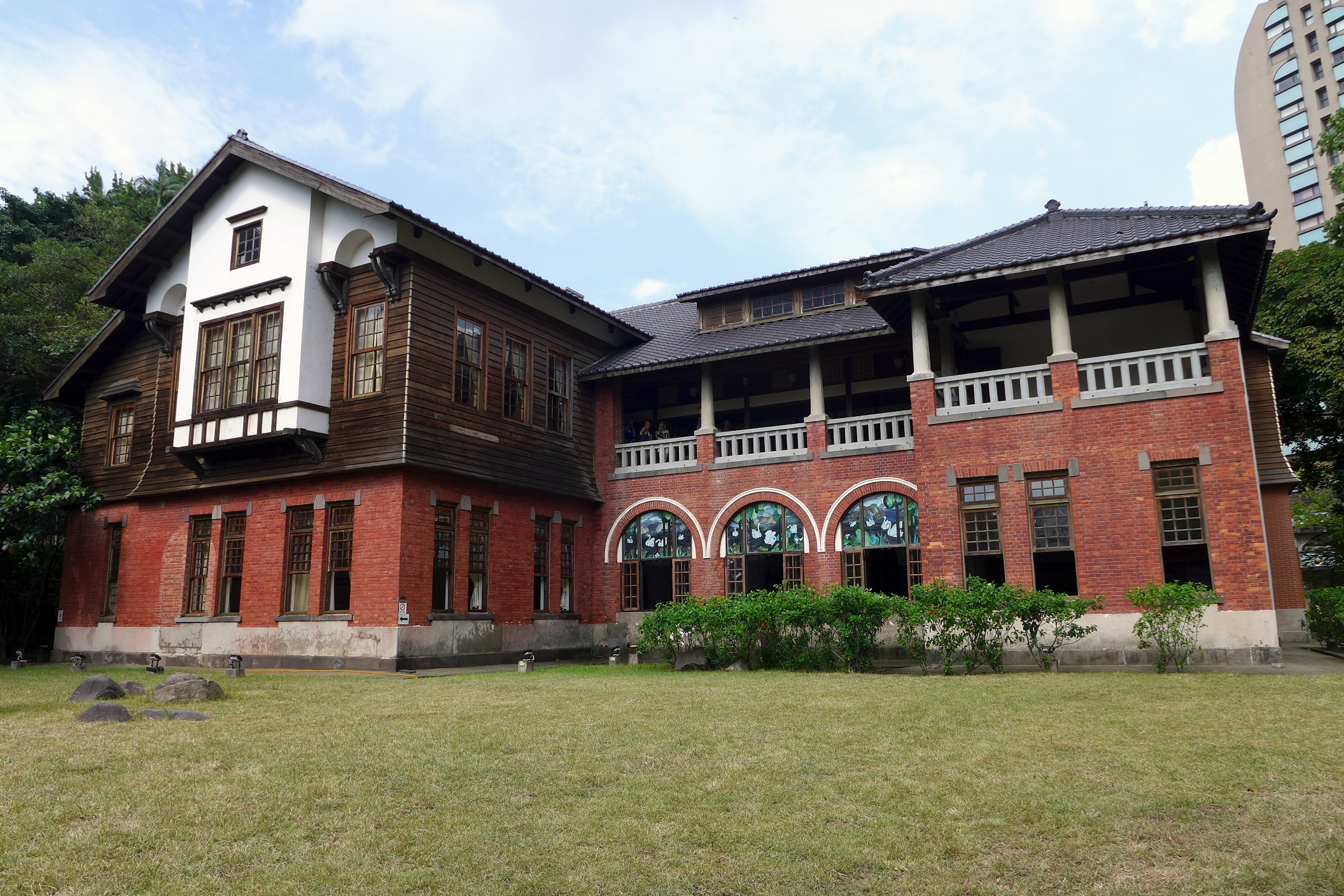
- Former name: Beitou Public Bathhouse
- Established: 31 October 1998
- Location: Beitou, Taipei, Taiwan
- Coordinates: 25°08′12″N 121°30′26″E
- Type: museum
- Public transit access: Xinbeitou Station
- Website: Official website

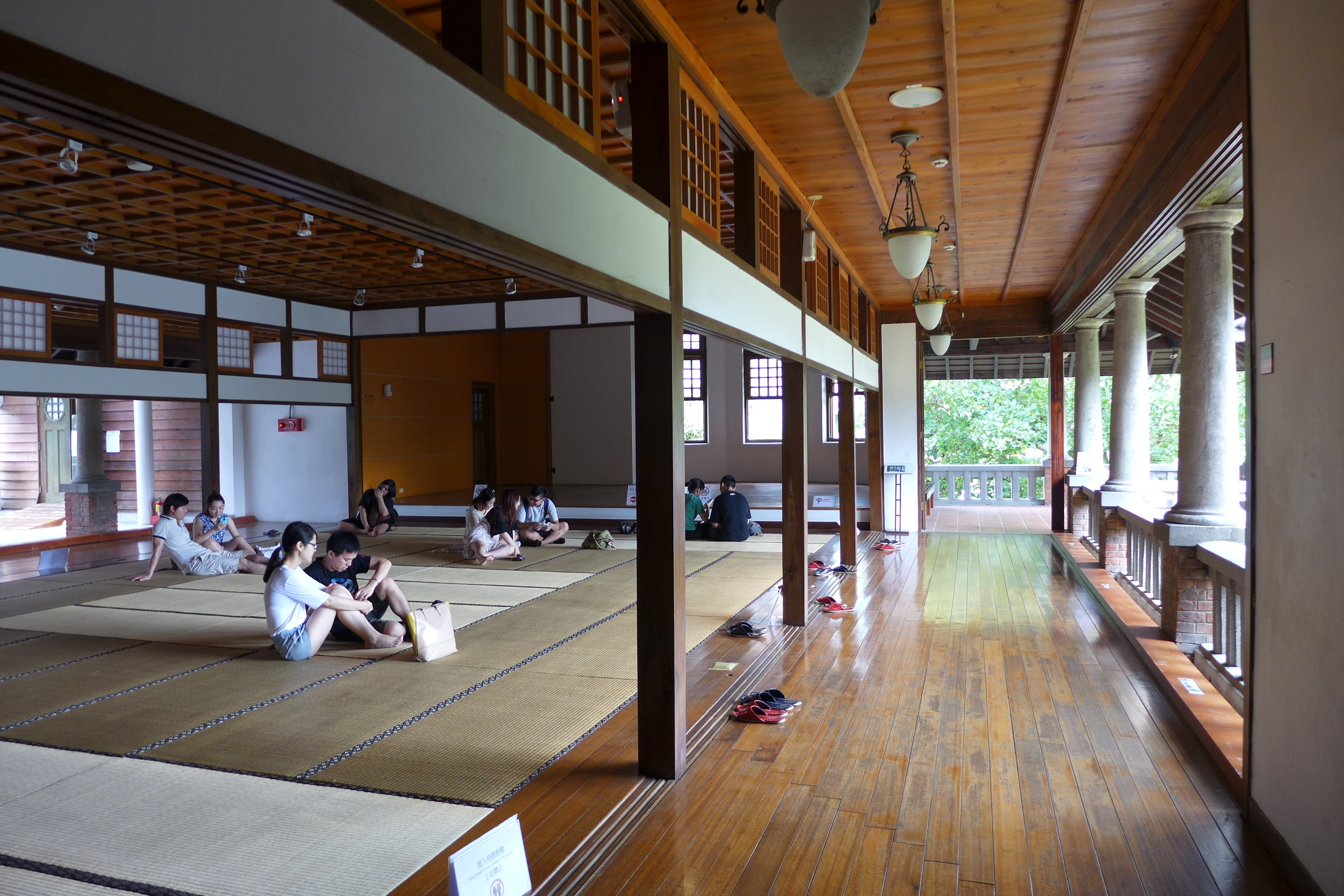
Tatami Lobby

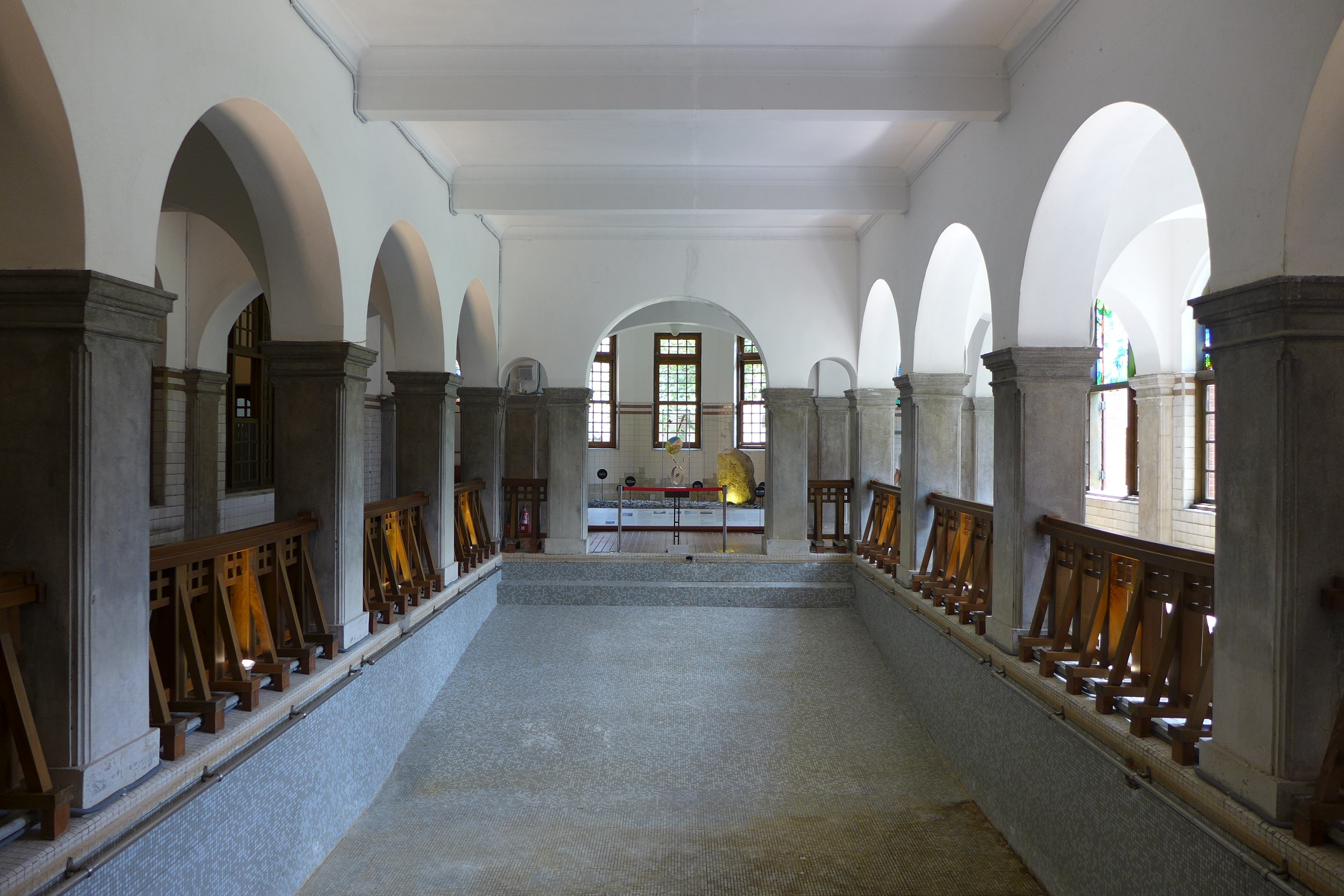
Big Bath

The Beitou Hot Spring Museum (traditional Chinese: 北投溫泉博物館; simplified Chinese: 北投温泉博物馆; pinyin: Běitóu Wēnquán Bówùguǎn) is a museum about hot spring in Beitou Park, Beitou District, Taipei, Taiwan.

== History ==
The construction of the building started in 1911 and completed in 1913 during the Japanese rule of Taiwan. It was initially built as Hokutō Public Bathhouse, the largest bathhouse in East Asia at that time.

After the handover of Taiwan from Japan to the Republic of China in 1945, the facility underwent several transformations, from police station, Kuomintang headquarter, to a reception house for local county administration called the Zhongshan House. However, the building was eventually closed and abandoned due to the corrosion caused by the hot springs and lack of proper maintenance. The building was declared a class 3 historical site by the Ministry of the Interior in February 1995. In March 1998, an overall makeover was initiated and completed with the official opening on 31 October 1998 as Beitou Hot Spring Museum.

== Architecture ==
The museum is a Edwardian-style building which was built with red bricks and wooden weatherboards.

== Exhibitions ==
The museum is divided into two stories. The first floor houses the public bath which is no longer in use along with the introduction of hot springs history, hot spring facilities, appliances used in hot springs, Beitou stones, and the bathing space. The second floor houses six different exhibition areas, including Beitou history, a lookout balcony, Taiwanese Hollywood, exhibition area B, a multimedia room, and a tatami floor recreational area.

== Access ==
The museum is accessible within walking distance east from Xinbeitou Station of the Taipei Metro.

== See also ==
- List of museums in Taiwan
- Taiwanese hot springs
