= Hot springs in Taiwan =

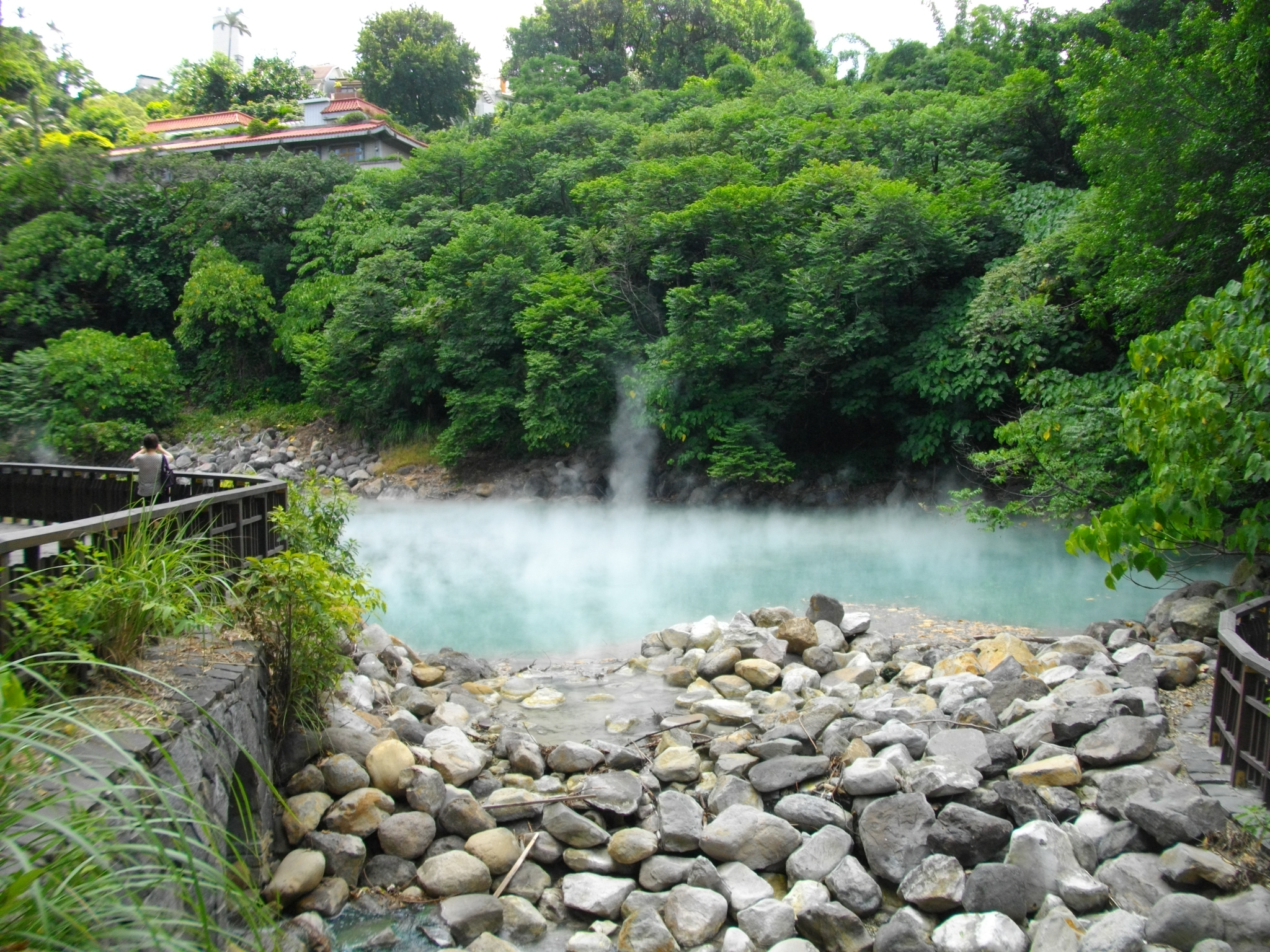
Hot spring in Beitou Hell Valley

Taiwan is part of the collision zone between the Yangtze Plate and Philippine Sea Plate. Eastern and southern Taiwan are the northern end of the Philippine Mobile Belt.

Located next to an oceanic trench and volcanic system in a tectonic collision zone, Taiwan has evolved a unique environment that produces high-temperature springs with crystal-clear water, usually both clean and safe to drink. These hot springs are commonly used for spas and resorts.

Soaking in hot springs became popular in Taiwan around 1895 during the 50-year long colonial rule by Japan.

== History ==
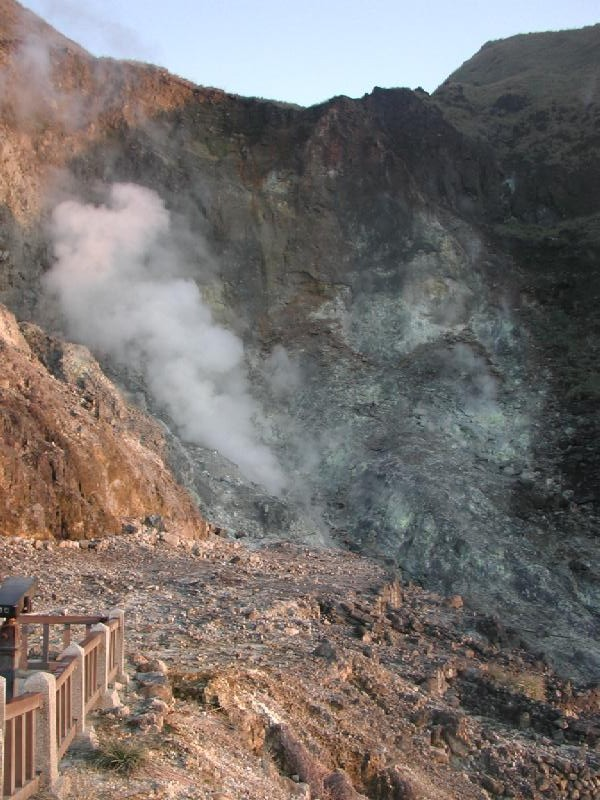
Closer view of hot springs on Seven Star Mountain located in Yangmingshan

The first mention of Taiwan's hot springs came from a 1697 manuscript, Beihai Jiyou, but they were not developed until 1893, when a German businessman discovered Beitou and later established a small local spa.

Under Japanese rule, the government constantly promoted and further enhanced the natural hot springs. The Japanese rule brought with them their rich onsen culture of spring soaking, which had a great influence on Taiwan.

In March 1896, Hirado Gengo from Osaka, Japan opened Taiwan's first hot spring hotel, called Tenguan (天狗庵). He not only heralded a new era of hot spring bathing in Beitou, but also paved the road for a whole new hot spring culture for Taiwan. In the Japanese onsen culture, hot springs are claimed to offer many health benefits. As well as raising energy levels, the minerals in the water are commonly suggested to help treat chronic fatigue, eczema or arthritis.

During Japanese rule, the four major hot springs in Taiwan were in modern-day Beitou, Yangmingshan, Guanziling and Sichongxi. However, under Republic of China administration starting from 1945, the hot spring culture in Taiwan gradually lost momentum. It was not until 1999 that the authorities again started large-scale promotion of Taiwan's hot springs, setting off a renewed hot spring fever.

In recent years, hot spring spas and resorts on Taiwan have gained more popularity. With the support of the government, the hot spring has become not only another industry but also again part of Taiwanese culture.

Taiwan has one of the highest concentrations (more than 100 hot springs) and greatest variety of thermal springs in the world varying from hot springs to cold springs, mud springs, and seabed hot springs.

== Geology ==
Taiwan is located on a faultline where several continental plates meet; the Philippine Sea Plate and the Eurasian Plate intersect in the Circum-Pacific seismic zone.

== Types of springs ==
- Sodium carbonate springs
- Sulfur springs
- Ferrous springs
- Sodium hydrogen carbonate springs
- Mud springs

(spring water contains alkaline and iodine, is salty and has a light sulfuric smell)

- Salt or hydrogen sulfide springs

== Partial list of hot springs in Taiwan ==
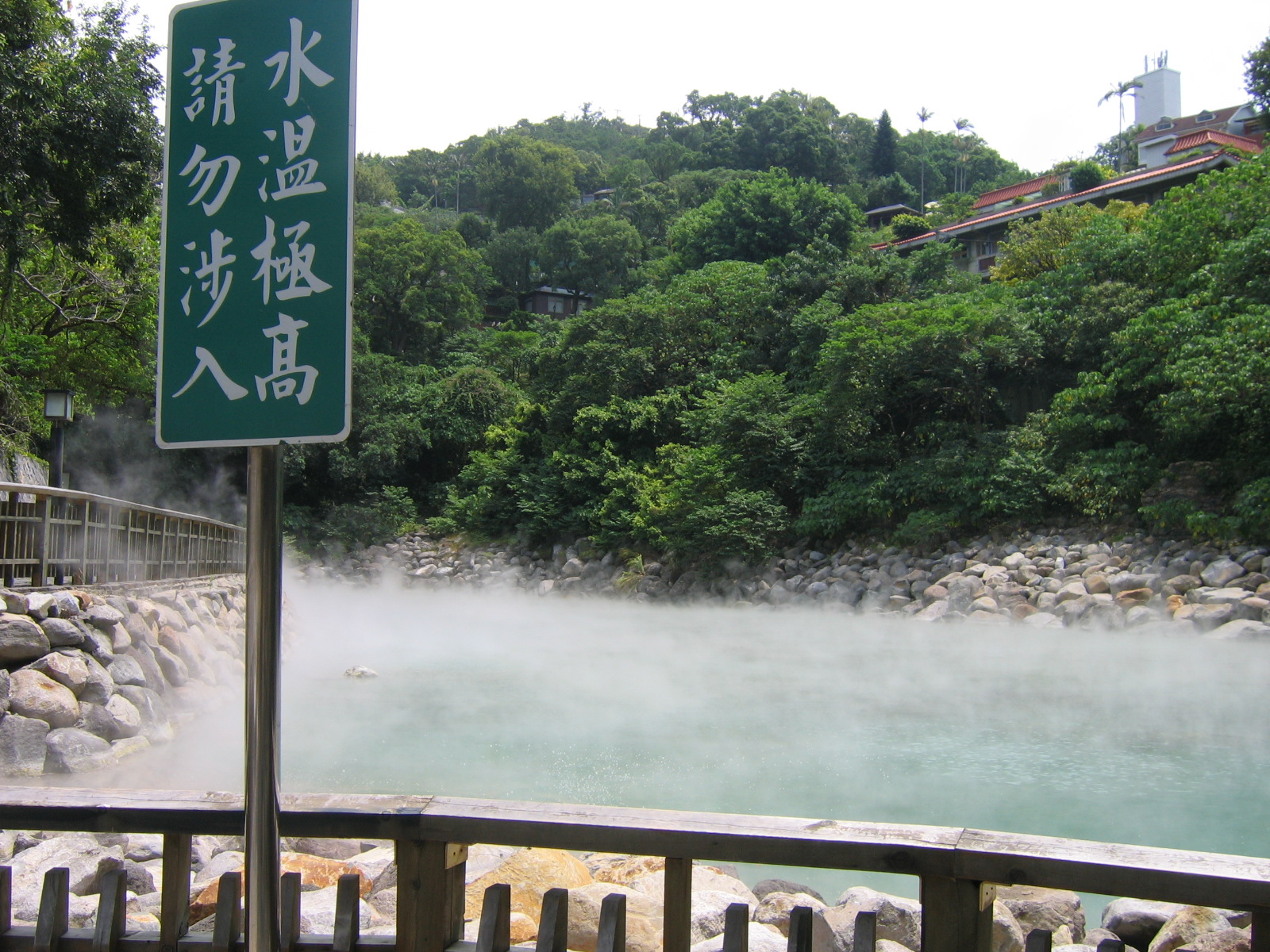
Hot Spring Valley in Beitou

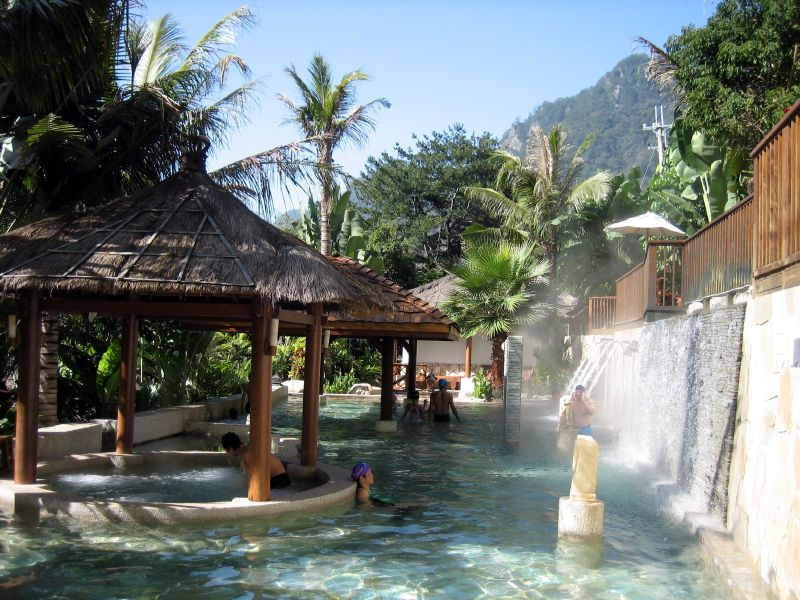
Guguan Hot Springs

- Jiaoxi
- Beitou – considered the "hot spring capital of Taiwan"
- Zhiben
- Tai-an – odorless and colorless alkaline carbonate hot spring
- Yangmingshan
- Guguan
- Guanziling – known for its mud baths.
- Sichongxi
- Wulai
- Ruisui, Hualien – has high iron content, giving the water a brownish tint.
- Zhaori

== See also ==
- Culture of Taiwan
- List of hot springs
- Hailuogou Hot Spring
- Onsen
