= Xinbeitou metro station =

Metro station in Taipei, Taiwan

Xinbeitou 新北投
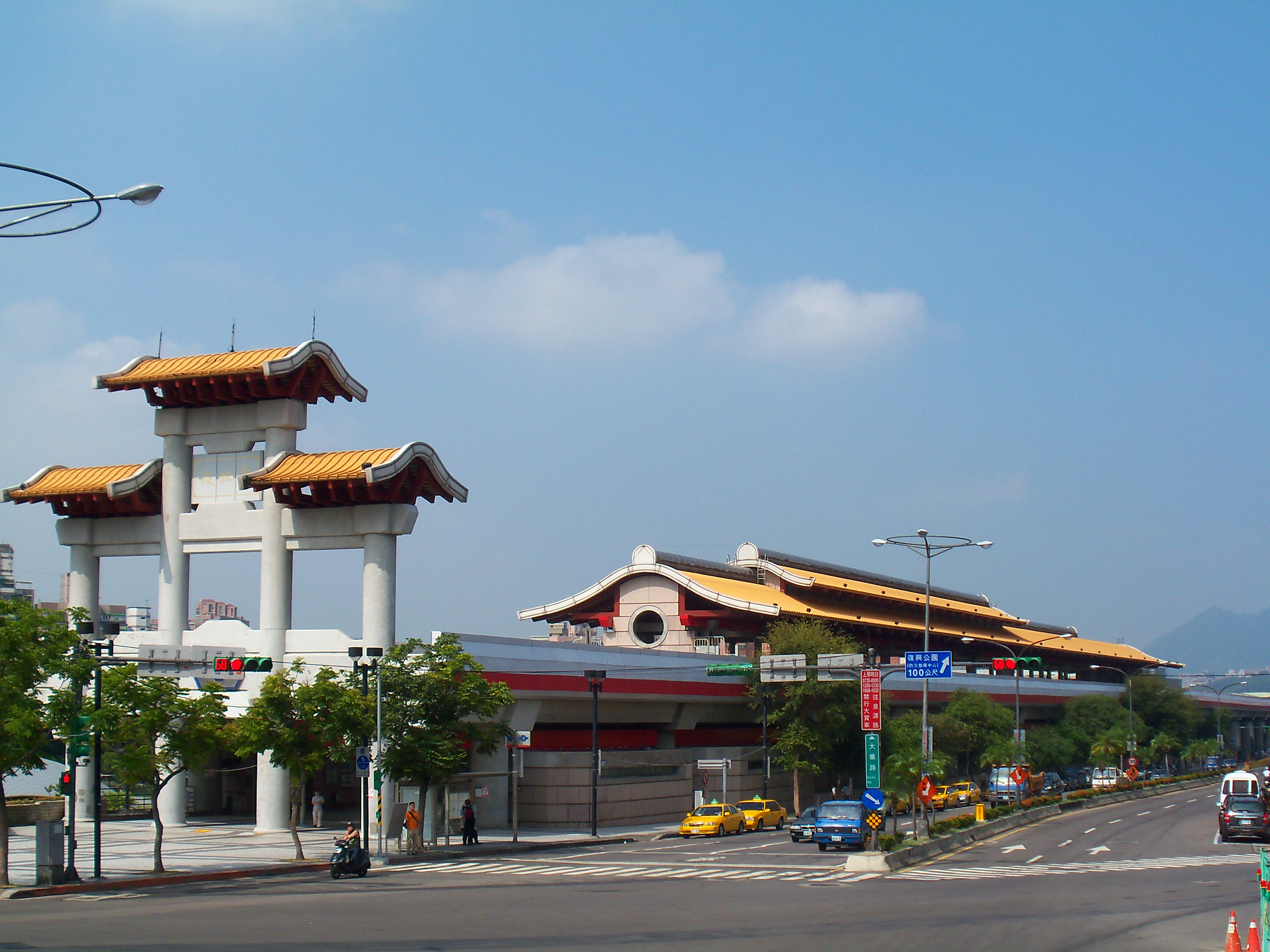
- Xinbeitou station exterior

General information
- Location: No. 700, Daye Rd. Beitou, Taipei; Taiwan
- Coordinates: 25.136956°N 121.502368°E
- Operator: Taipei Metro
- Line: Xinbeitou branch line (R22A)
- Platforms: 2 (1 island platform)
- Tracks: 2
- Connections: Bus stop

Construction
- Structure type: Elevated
- Platform levels: 1
- Accessible: Yes

Other information
- Station code: R22A

History
- Opened: April 1, 1916 (as TRA station)
- Closed: July 15, 1988 (as TRA station)
- Rebuilt: March 28, 1997 (as Taipei Metro station)
- Former names: Hsin Peitou (1997-2003)

Passengers
- daily (December 2024)
- Rank: 89 out of 109

Services
Preceding station	Taipei Metro	Following station
Beitou Terminus	Xinbeitou branch line	Terminus
Location

Xinbeitou metro station

Chinese name
- Chinese: 新北投
- Literal meaning: New Beitou
Transcriptions
Standard Mandarin
- Hanyu Pinyin: Xīnběitóu
- Bopomofo: ㄒㄧㄣ ㄅㄟˇ ㄊㄡˊ
- Wade–Giles: Hsin^{1} Pei^{3}-t'ou^{2}
Hakka
- Pha̍k-fa-sṳ: Sîn-pet-thèu
Southern Min
- Tâi-lô: Sin-pak-tâu

Japanese name
- Kanji: 新北投駅
- Kana: しんほくとうえき
Transcriptions
- Romanization: Shin-hokutō Eki

The Taipei Metro Xinbeitou station (formerly transliterated as Hsin Peitou station from 1997 until 2003) is the terminal station on the Xinbeitou branch line located in Beitou District, Taipei, Taiwan. This location used to be the terminal station for the now-defunct TRA Hsin Peitou Line.

== Station overview ==
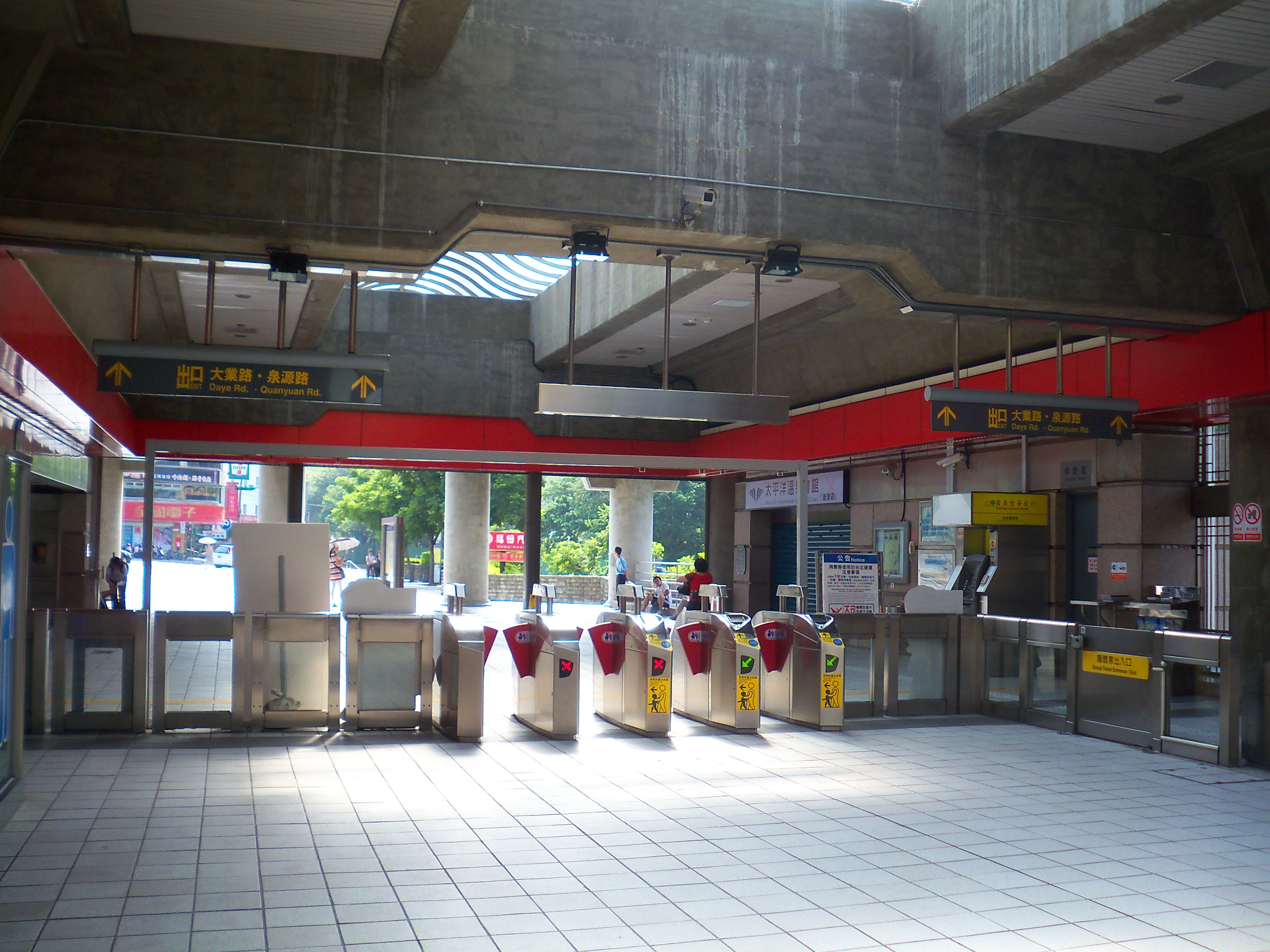
Xinbeitou station concourse

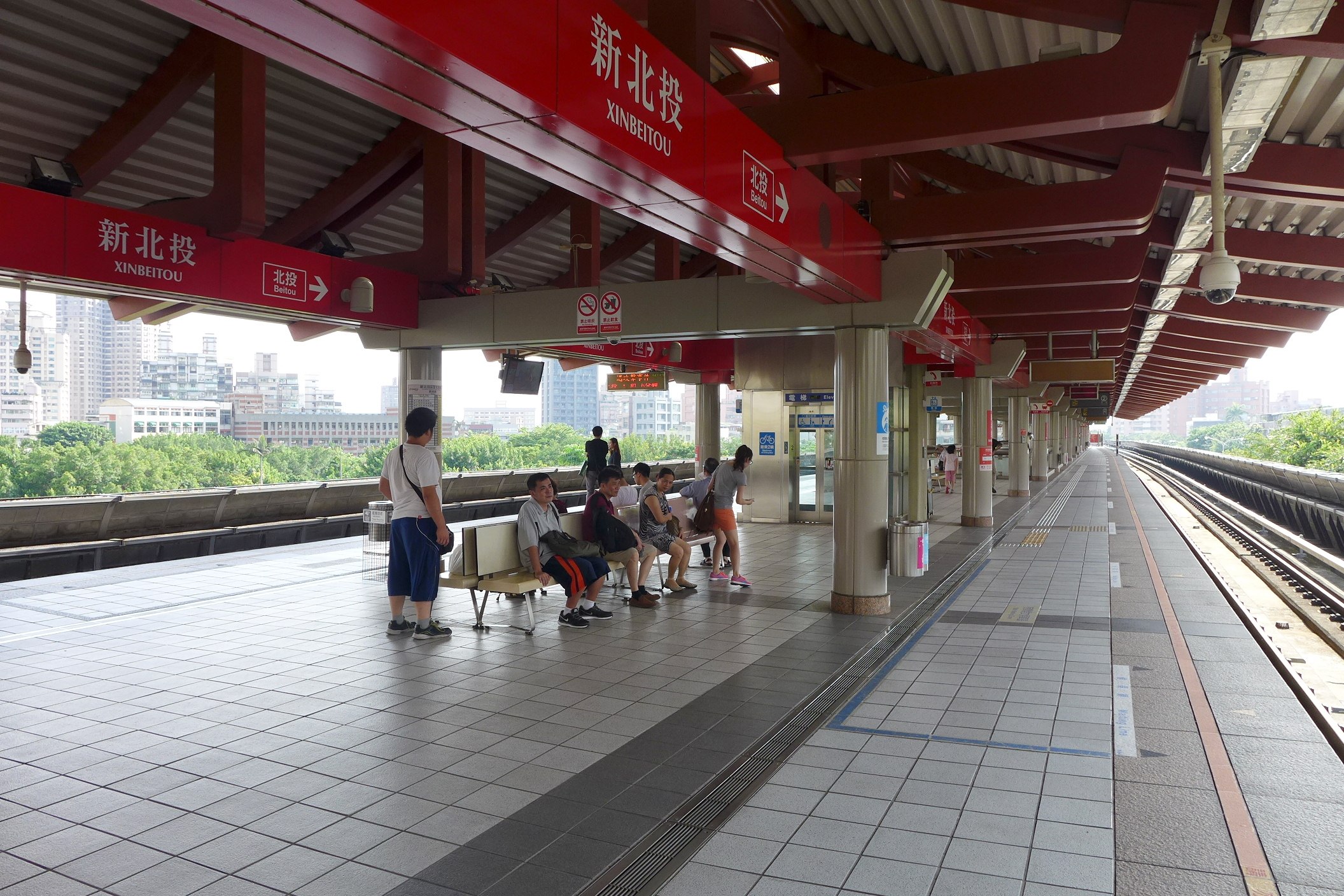
Xinbeitou station platform

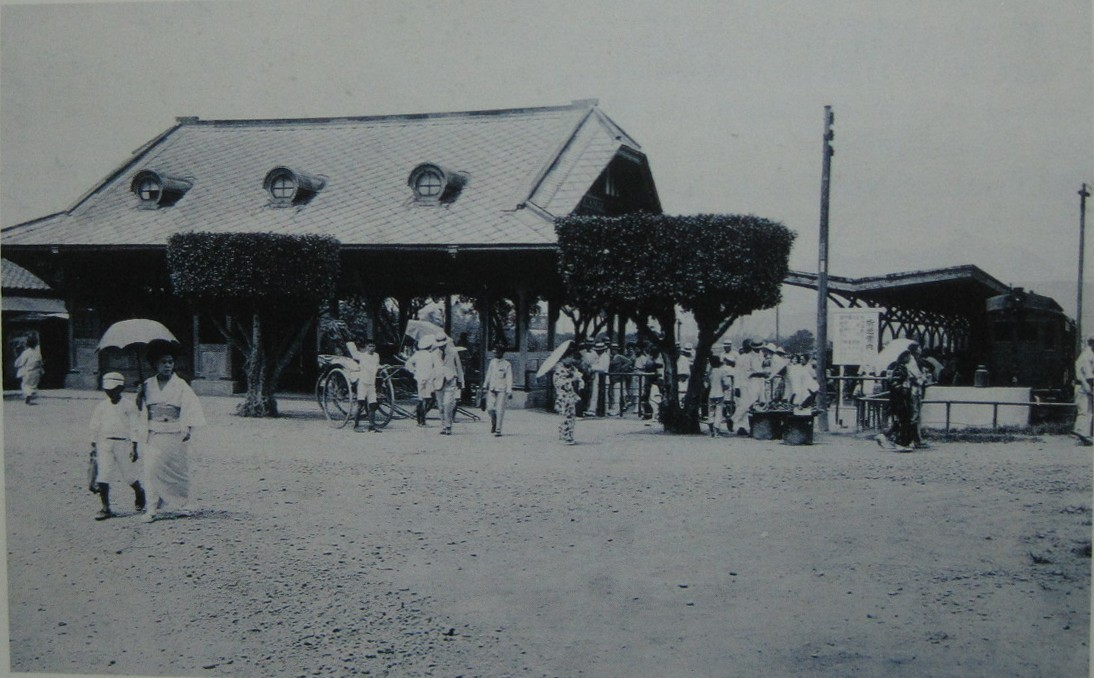
Former railway Shin-Hokutō/Hsin Peitou station building

Xinbeitou Historic Station

The two-level, elevated station features an island platform and two exits. The station is known for being the closest to the Beitou hot springs, such as Beitou Hot Spring Museum, Beitou Plum Garden, Ketaglan Culture Center, Beitou Hot Springs, Beitou Park and Sushi Express restaurant.

== History ==
The station originally opened as the terminus for the Shin-hokutō Line as Shin-Hokutō station (Japanese: 新北投驛) on April 1, 1916. It reopened on 1937 after renovation. The station and the tracks form a unique "T" configuration. On July 15, 1988, the service was ceased with the discontinuation of Tamsui and Hsin Peitou line.

== Station layout ==
2F	Platform 2	← Xinbeitou branch line toward Beitou (R22 Terminus) (backup platform)
2F	Island platform, doors will open on the left
2F	Platform 1	← Xinbeitou branch line toward Beitou (R22 terminus)
1F (street level)	Concourse	Entrance/exit, lobby, information desk, automatic ticket dispensing machines, one-way faregates Restrooms

After termination of TRA services, the original station building was disassembled and moved to Changhua for display at the Taiwan Folk Village. On April 1, 2017, the station building was returned and re-opened at nearby Qixing Park in Beitou.

It was reopened on March 28, 1997, with the opening of the Xinbeitou branch line.

There was a knife attack injuring one police officer on March 29, 2016.

== Around the station ==
- Beitou Park
- Beitou Plum Garden
