= Song Creek =

Creek in Taiwan

Song Creek (Chinese: 松溪）is a creek located in northern Taiwan, belonging to the Danshui River system and serving as a tributary of the Huang Creek. The river has a length of 2.93 kilometers and a watershed area of 4.5 square kilometers, situated at the border of Shilin District and Beitou District in Taipei City. Its source is on the southern side of Qixing Mountain, at an elevation of approximately 1,100 meters, near the Zhongshan Building in Yangmingshan. It flows southwest through the area between Shamao Mountain and Huakang, continuing through Banling and eventually joining the Huang Creek near Houdong.
