= Tatun Volcanic Group =

Group of volcanoes in Taiwan

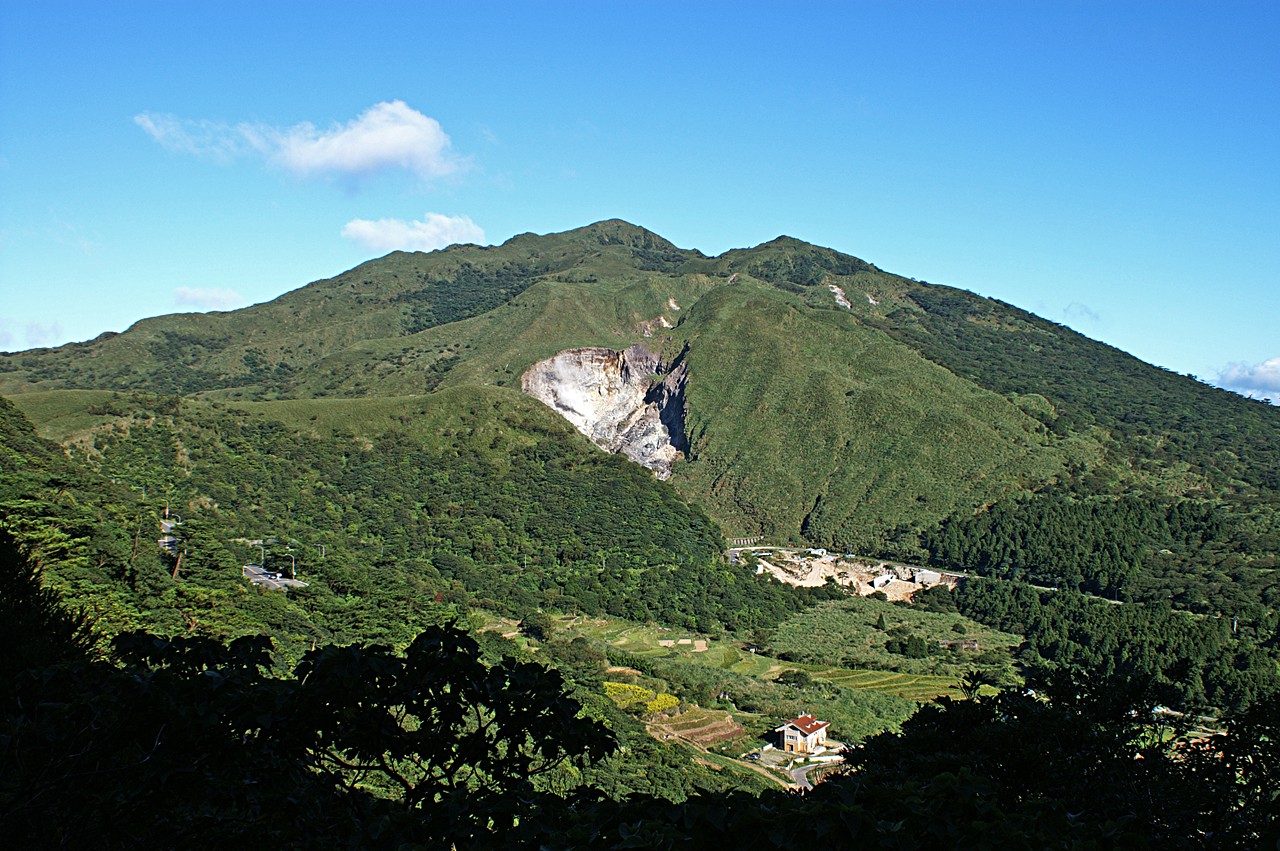
- Qixing Mountain, tallest of the TVG volcanoes

Highest point
- Elevation: 1,120 m (3,670 ft)
- Prominence: 1,059 m (3,474 ft)
- Listing: Ribu
- Coordinates: 25°10′17″N 121°33′18″E

Naming
- Etymology: Indigenous Taiwanese, Hokkien
- Native name: 大屯火山群 (Chinese)

Geography
- Location within Taiwan
- Location: Taipei City and New Taipei City

Geology
- Formed by: subduction zone volcanism
- Rock age(s): Pliocene and Pleistocene
- Mountain type: andesitic lava domes
- Volcanic arc: Ryukyu Arc
- Last eruption: Holocene

The Tatun Volcanic Group or Tatun Volcano Group (TVG) (Chinese: 大屯火山群; pinyin: Dàtún Huǒshān Qún) constitutes a group of volcanoes located in northern Taiwan. It is located 15 km north of Taipei, and lies to the west of Keelung. It just adjoins the northern coast of the Taiwan island. The volcanic group was a result of episodic volcanism between 2.8 and 0.2 Ma. Research in the 2020s suggest that there were eruptions more recently than 0.2 Ma. The last eruption occurred in the year 648.

As of 2005, some geothermal activity was occurring and gas fumaroles were active among these volcanoes. Observations of the Tatun Volcanic Group suggest that magma chambers probably still exist under the land surface of northern Taiwan. Data collected between 2019 and 2022 have shown that the group has a magmatic-hydrothermal system that is degassing. Fluid pressure from the system is causing microearthquakes.

The Taiwan Volcano Observatory (TVO) at Tatun in Yangmingshan National Park, affiliated with Academia Sinica’s Institute of Earth Sciences, monitors the group. The TVO has multi-volcano real-time monitoring systems and conducts analysis in earth-crust transformation, geochemistry, seismology, thermometry, and more.

In 2002 the TVG was listed as a potential World Heritage Site.

== History ==
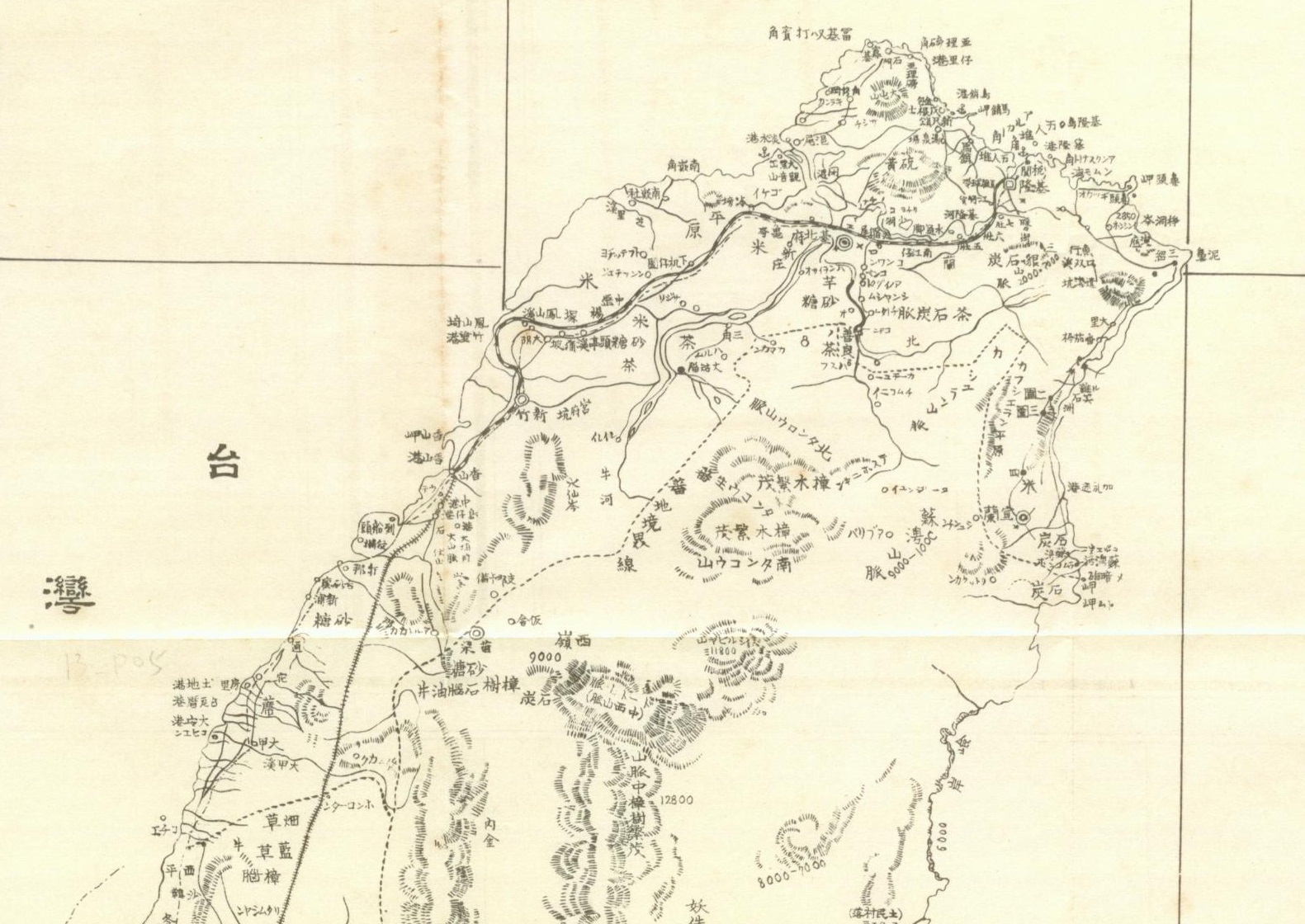
Northern Taiwan (1896)

The north of the island is where evidence of volcanic activity is most obvious. Taiwanese indigenous peoples, including those of the Yuanshan and Shihsanhang cultures, used to hunt and fish there under the volcanoes, where rainfall, creeks, flora, and fauna were and still are abundant. Several of the creeks drain into the Taipei Basin. Sulfur from the Tatun area was mined and traded during the Ming and Qing dynasties. Han Chinese began settling in the area in the 18th century. One etymology interpretation is that the name Tatun or Datun comes from an indigenous word and was transliterated in Chinese to "large" (大, Dà) "settlement" (屯, Tún); the third largest mountain in the group is called Datun Mountain (大屯山, Dà tún shān). Twa-tun is the name in Hokkien. Economic activities the settlers engaged in included charcoal making, farming, indigo dye production, and stone masonry. Hot spring clubs and resorts emerged in the vicinity in the late 19th century.

During the Japanese Colonial Period in Taiwan (Taihoku), public baths and parks opened. There were some inferences about volcanism at that time. James W. Davidson, Consul of the United States for Formosa, wrote about "...abundant evidence of volcanic action…" and "volcanic life" at the location in his book The Island of Formosa, Past and Present (1903), which has been called "...the major English language survey of Taiwan for its days…" In the early 20th century, the North Range of hills, also called Daitonzan from Japanese, had three craters between Tamsui and Kimpauli (approx. modern-day Jinshan). The North hill crater, over 210 metres (700 ft) in diameter and about 120 metres (400 ft) deep, was the most extensive and was sometimes filled with water. The Japanese encouraged the development of tea and rice farms in the region.

Following Japanese rule, there was a nearby red light district that eventually closed down in the late 1970s. Tourism for other activities, such as hiking, has picked up since then. For decades, geothermal energy investigation in the area was impeded because of acidic fluids, but progresses have been made with recent technologies. The Sihuangziping Pilot Geothermal Power Plant in Jinshan was commissioned in 2023.

Since a major eruption has not occurred in more than one thousand years, many residents believed the volcanoes were extinct. After scientists conducted studies that showed it may be an active volcano system, the Taiwan government and scientific bodies, like the Central Weather Administration (formerly Central Weather Bureau), started taking steps to more closely monitor the group and have an early warning system. Other organizations involved in the study of the group include Academia Sinica, the Central Geological Survey, Ministry of the Interior, and National Science and Technology Council. In 2024, a volcano exhibition with modern display technology and simulations was opened at a nature center in Yangmingshan National Park.

== Geology ==
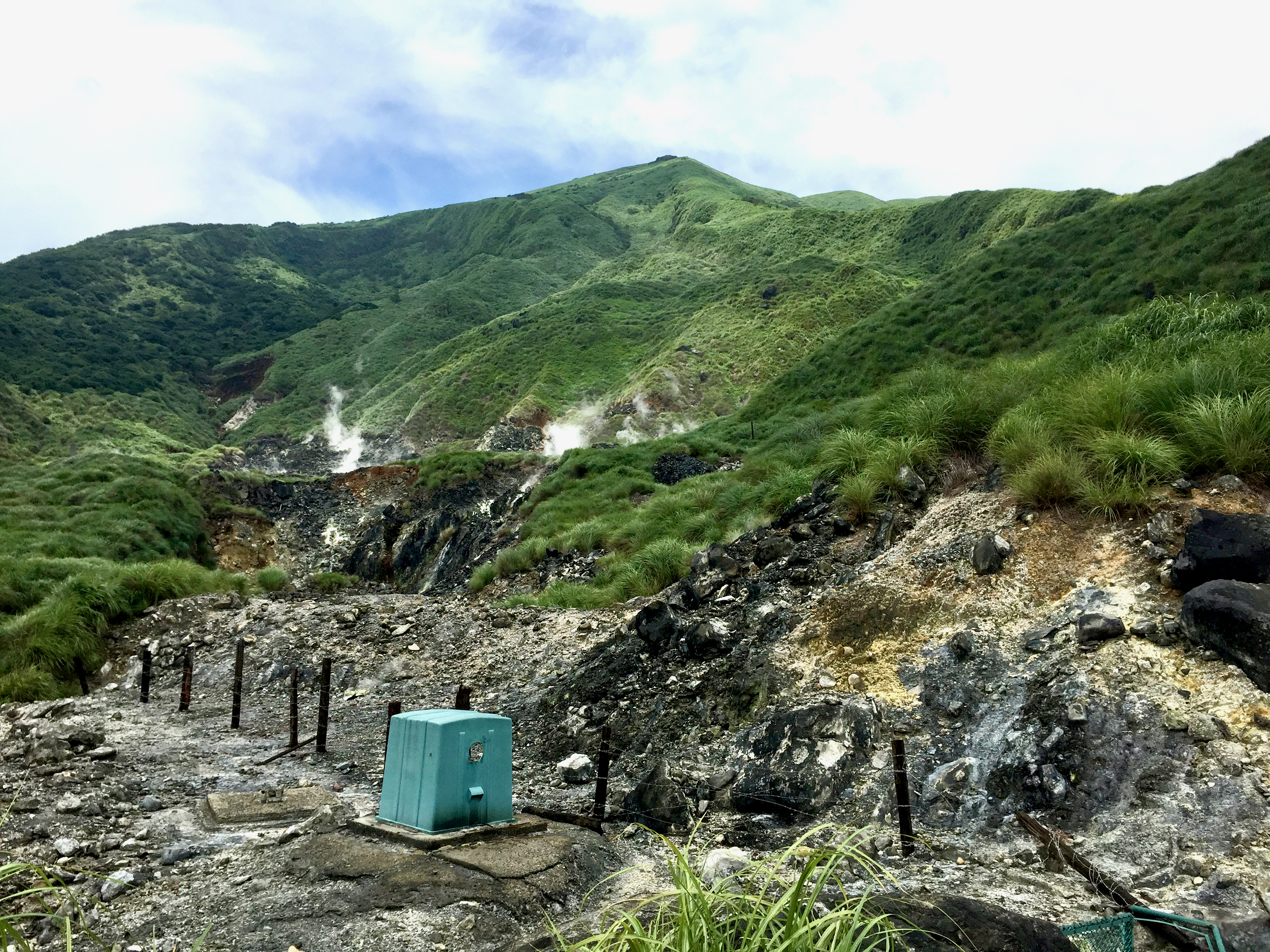
Tatun Volcanic gasses alteration zone

The group is a cluster or series of andesitic lava domes, including tuff cones, consisting of approximately or more than 20 volcanoes. It is at a subduction zone and the western end of the Ryukyu Arc. There is evidence of Pliocene, Pleistocene, and Holocene eruptions. Rock types include basaltic andesite and, to a lesser extent, basalt and picrite basalt. The highest and youngest volcano is Mount Qixing, which has a smaller volcano called Shamao Mountain on it.

There are volcanic vents at Dayoukeng and Siaoyoukeng (Xiaoyoukeng). microearthquakes, as well as volcanic gas emissions that kill vegetation, occur at or near them. Steam has been observed coming from vents in the Longfeng Valley. In addition to Qixing and Dayoukeng, Huangzuishan has been identified as a site of potential eruption. Possible Tatun Volcanic Group phreatic, magmatic, or phreatomagmatic eruptions, though probabilistically low, could produce lahars, pyroclastic density currents, volcanic ash, or other volcanic hazards and have human, economic, and geopolitical consequences given the group's proximity to population centers and infrastructure in Taipei City and New Taipei City. Consequently, there has been a call for enhanced volcanic disaster risk reduction in the two municipalities.

== Volcanic edifices ==
Volcanic edifices (i.e., andesitic lava domes) of the Tatun Volcanic Group include:

Volcanic edifices
Name	Chinese	Elevation (m)	Coordinates	Notes
Mt. Guanyin	觀音山	588 m	25.13581°N 121.42664°E	
Mt. Xiaoguanyin	小觀音山	1038 m	25.18883°N 121.54234°E	
Mt. Datun	大屯山	1082 m	25.17661°N 121.52193°E	
Mt. Datun West Peak	大屯山西峰	959 m	25.17124°N 121.5136°E	
Mt. Zhuzi	竹子山	1094 m	25.21457°N 121.56308°E	
Mt. Huangzui	磺嘴山	894 m	25.17675°N 121.60619°E	
Mt. Dajian	大尖山	818 m	25.16221°N 121.60163°E	
Mt. Dajianhou	大尖後山	867 m	25.17426°N 121.59203°E	
Shiti Ridge	石梯嶺	849 m	25.16135°N 121.58721°E	
Mt. Zhusong	竹嵩山	801 m	25.15841°N 121.57278°E	
Mt. Shamao	紗帽山	640 m	25.14831°N 121.54298°E	
Mt. Xiaocao	小草山	576 m	25.13439°N 121.5638°E	
Mt. Qixing	七星山	1120 m	25.17073°N 121.55338°E	
Mt. Qigu	七股山	889 m	25.17182°N 121.56569°E	
Mt. Xiangtian	向天山	929 m	25.1728°N 121.5028°E	
Mt. Bailaka / Mt. Balaka	百拉咔山 / 巴拉卡山	890 m	25.18818°N 121.51729°E	
Mt. Caigong / Mt. Caigongkeng	菜公坑山 / 菜公坑山	871 m	25.1916°N 121.52069°E	
Mt. Honglu	烘爐山 / 洪爐山	634 m	25.19397°N 121.51189°E	

== See also ==
- Qixing Mountain (Taipei)
- Yangmingshan National Park
- Yellowstone Caldera
- Valley of Geysers
