= Guesthouses of Chiang Kai-shek =

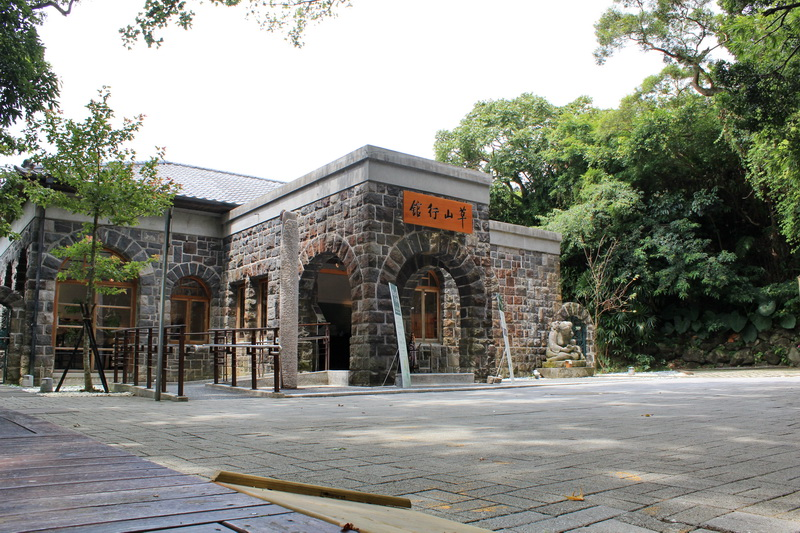
Grass Mountain Chateau, summer residence of President Chiang in Yangmingshan, Taipei.

The Guesthouses of Chiang Kai-shek (Chinese: 蔣公行館; pinyin: Jiǎnggōngxíng Guǎn) were built in order for the former President of the Republic of China, Chiang Kai-shek, to have places to stay while travelling on inspection tours and holidays around Taiwan. According to current Republic of China statistics, there are 30 guesthouses in Taiwan which were used by Chiang during his lifetime. Many have been transformed into museums, art and literature centers, and tourist hotels.

== Guesthouses ==
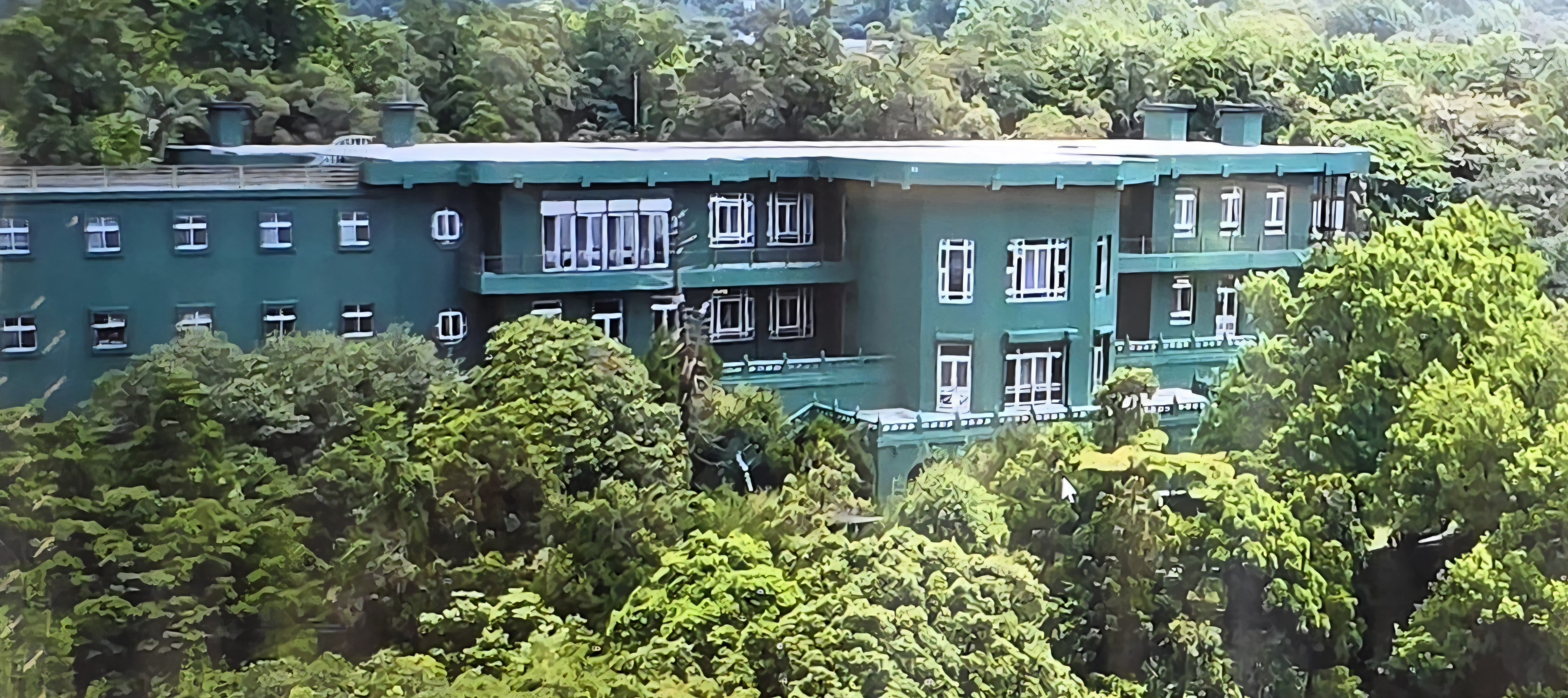
Zhongxing Guesthouse, another summer residence of President Chiang in Yangmingshan, Taipei.

- First Guesthouse in Magong City, Penghu
- Grass Mountain Chateau in Beitou District, Taipei
- Zhongxing Guesthouse in Beitou District, Taipei
- Hanbilou in Nantou
- Daguan Pavilion in Lishan
- Sizihwan Guesthouse in Kaohsiung (now is the Xiziwan Art Gallery of National Sun Yat-sen University)
- Chengcing Lake Guesthouse in Kaohsiung
- Fuxing Guesthouse in Taoyuan
- Cihu in Daxi (houses the Cihu Mausoleum)
- Qilan Guesthouse
- Hehuanshan Pine Snow Guesthouse
- Kenting Guesthouse
- Alishan Honored Guesthouse
- Xitou Bamboo Hut
- Lushan Jingguang Mountain Villa
- Changhua Bagua Mountain Guesthouse
- Lishan Guesthouse
- Fushou Mountain Villa
- Jinshan Songtao Cabin
- Hualien Wenshan Guesthouse
- Chiayi Citizen Farm Guesthouse
- Kaohsiung Tengzhi Guesthouse
- Taichung Xieyuan Guesthouse

== See also ==
- Shilin Official Residence
