= Dactylispa excisa =

Scientific classification
- Kingdom: Animalia
- Phylum: Arthropoda
- Class: Insecta
- Order: Coleoptera
- Suborder: Polyphaga
- Infraorder: Cucujiformia
- Family: Chrysomelidae
- Genus: Dactylispa
- Species: D. excisa

Binomial name
- Dactylispa excisa (Kraatz, 1879)

Synonyms
- Hispa excisa Kraatz, 1879; Dactylispa excisa repanda Weise, 1922; Dactylispa (Platypriella) excisa meridionalis Chen & T'an, 1961

Species of beetle

Dactylispa excisa is a species of beetle of the family Chrysomelidae. It is found in China (Anhui, Zhejiang, Fujian, Hubei, Jiangxi, Jilin, Guizhou, Shaanxi, Sichuan, Yunnan), Japan, North Korea, South Korea, Russia and Taiwan.

== Life history ==
The recorded host plants for this species are Prunus (including Prunus phaeosticta), Quercus and Citrus species, as well as Zea mays and Malus sylvestris.
