= Grass Mountain Chateau =

- 蔣公草山行館
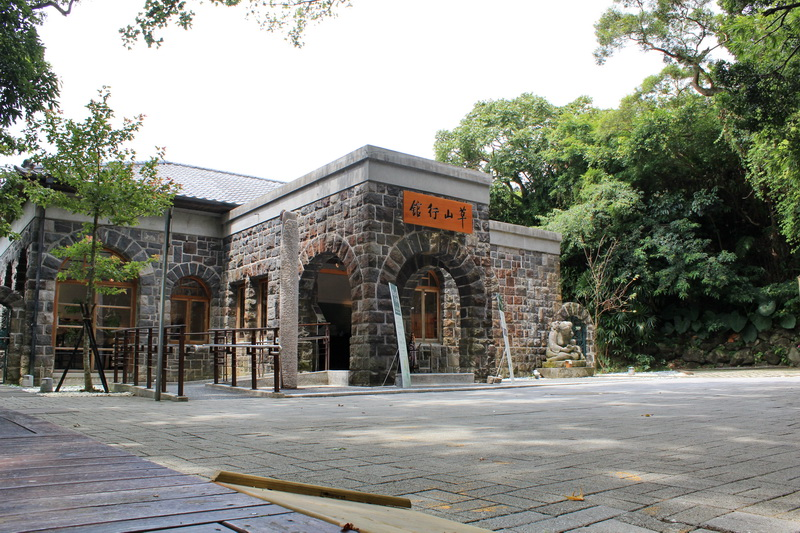
- Interactive map of the Grass Mountain Chateau area

General information
- Type: Former residence
- Location: Beitou, Taipei, Taiwan
- Coordinates: 25°9′16.55″N 121°32′18.15″E
- Completed: 1920

Design and construction
- Developer: Taiwan Sugar Corporation

The Grass Mountain Chateau (Chinese: 蔣公草山行館; pinyin: Jiǎng Gōng Cǎoshān Xíngguǎn; Pe̍h-ōe-jī: Chiúⁿ-kong Chháu-soaⁿ Hêng-koán) is a former residence of late President of the Republic of China Chiang Kai-shek. It is located in Beitou District, Taipei, Taiwan in Yangmingshan National Park.

== History ==
=== Empire of Japan ===
The Grass Mountain Chateau, a building surrounded by a partially landscaped 7,200 square meters (78,000 sq ft) site, was built by Taiwan Sugar Corporation in 1920. The chateau served as a recreational facility for employees and hosted Japanese royalty. Emperor Hirohito of Japan personally visited the residence and stayed there for 1 hour and 50 minutes, according to historical records.

=== Republic of China / Taiwan ===
When in 1949 the Republic of China government fled from Nanking to Taipei in Taiwan, Kuomintang leader Chiang Kai-shek claimed the chateau as his first official residence. The site served as Chiang's main residence for a year until a mansion closer to central Taipei could be completed. After the shift of Taiwan society to modern democracy in the 1990s, the chateau and its grounds served as both a historical museum and an art exhibition center, both of which are open to the public.

Early in the morning of April 7, 2001, a large fire engulfed the main halls of the chateau. The fire was brought under control within an hour but caused widespread damage. Taipei City officials reported the cause as arson, but stopped short of speculating that the motive may have been political. Three days later, the Taipei City Department of Cultural Affairs announced that the site would be restored at a cost of $US900,000. On December 29, 2011, the chateau reopened.

== See also ==
- Guesthouses of Chiang Kai-shek
- Seven Seas Residence
