= Shamao Mountain =

Mountain in Beitou, Taipei, Taiwan

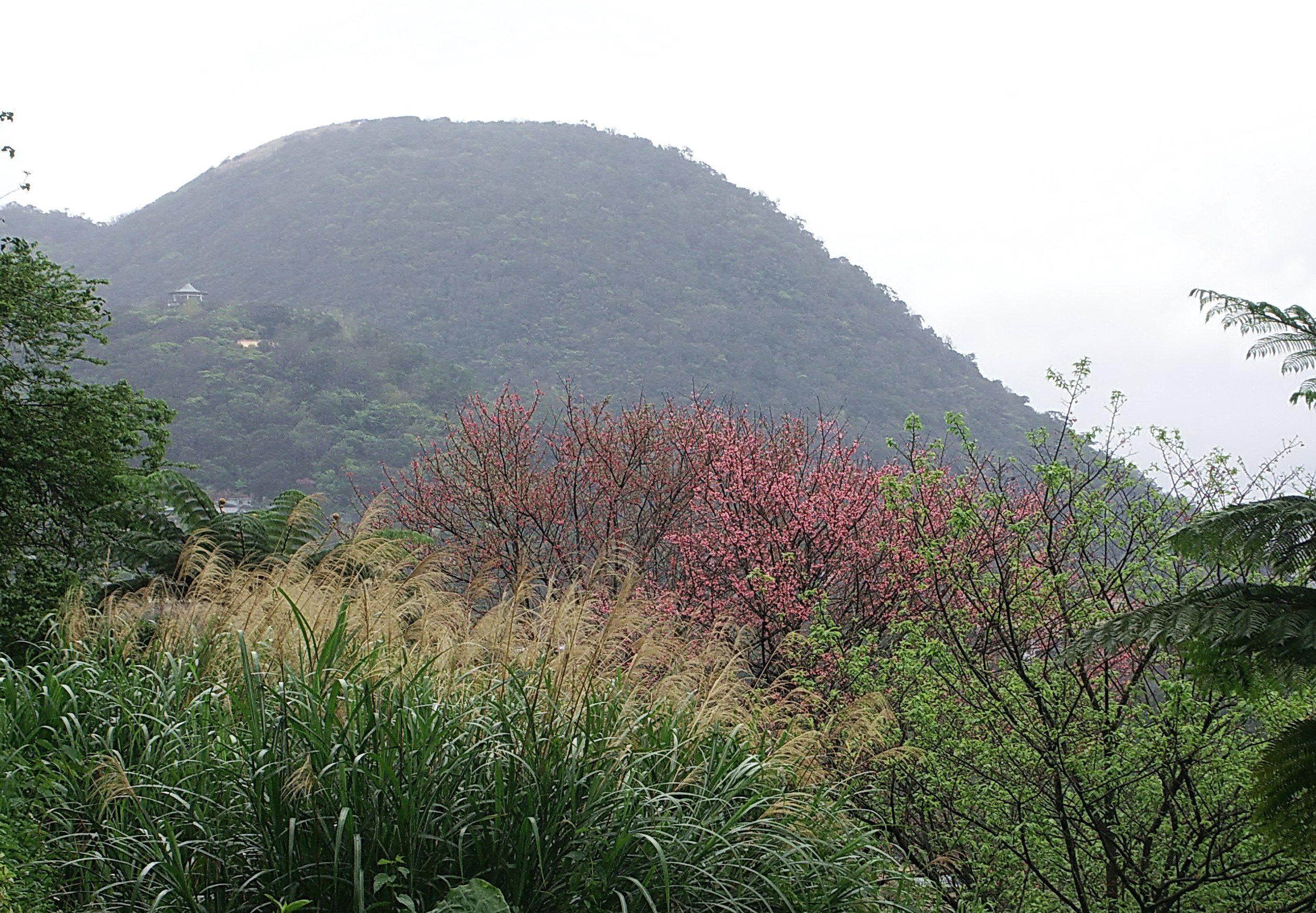

Highest point
- Elevation: 643 m (2,110 ft)
- Coordinates: 25°8′54″N 121°32′35″E

Geography
- Location within Taiwan
- Location: Beitou District, Taipei, Taiwan
- Parent range: Tatun Volcano Group

Geology
- Mountain type: Dormant volcano

Shamao Mountain (Chinese: 紗帽山; pinyin: Shāmàoshān), also called Mount Shamao, is a mountain located in Yangmingshan, in Beitou District, Taipei, Taiwan. Located on the Tatun Volcano Group, it stands at 643 m and a parasitic volcano of Qixing Mountain. Shamao Mountain is a round volcanic dome that looks like a black gauze cap. As the lava was more viscous when the mountain was formed, it gradually became a tholoid.
