= First Guesthouse =

Historic house in Magong, Penghu, Taiwan

- 第一賓館
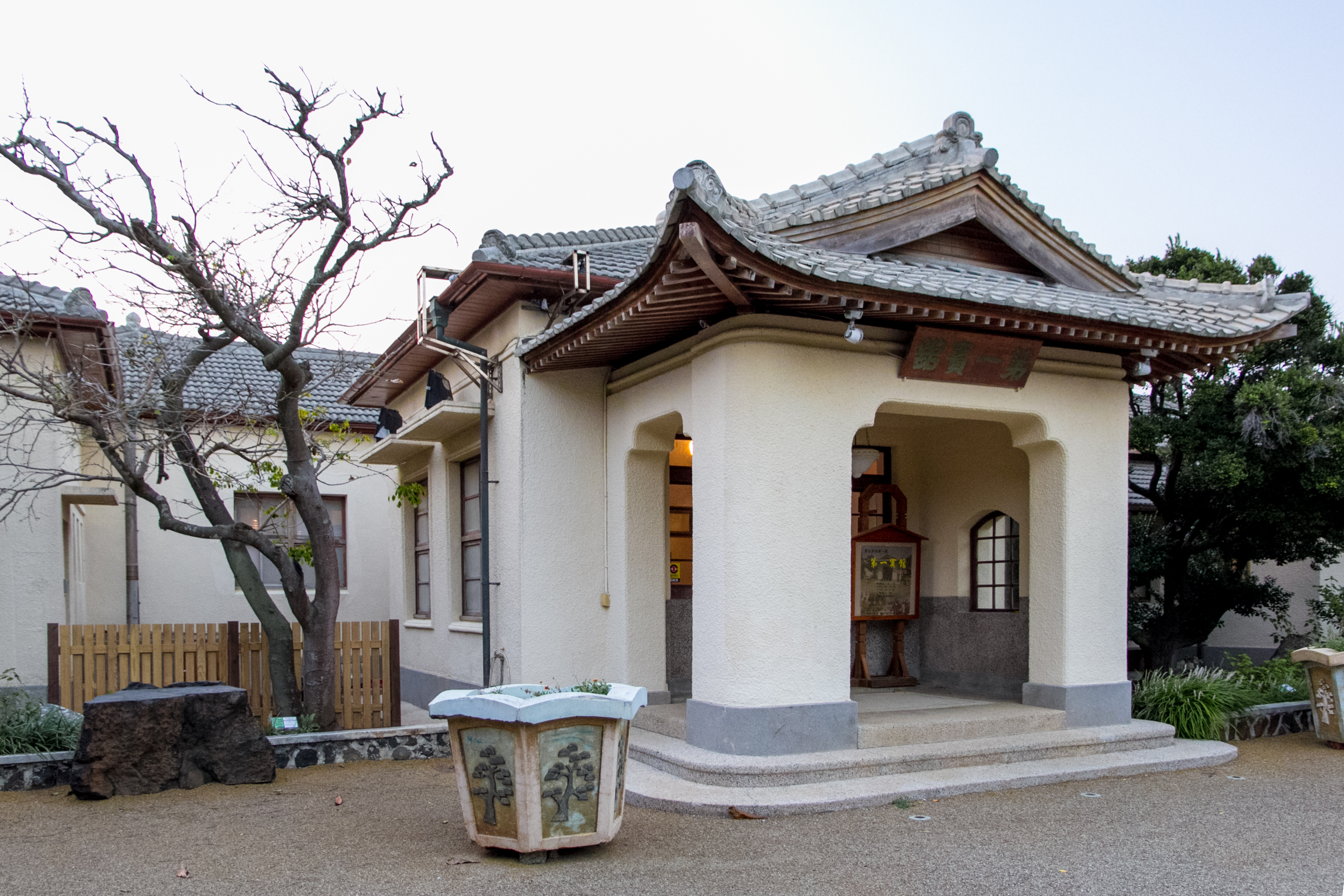
- Interactive map of the First Guesthouse area

General information
- Type: former guesthouse
- Location: Magong, Penghu, Taiwan
- Coordinates: 23°34′07.5″N 119°33′51.2″E
- Completed: February 1943

Website
- Official website (in Chinese)

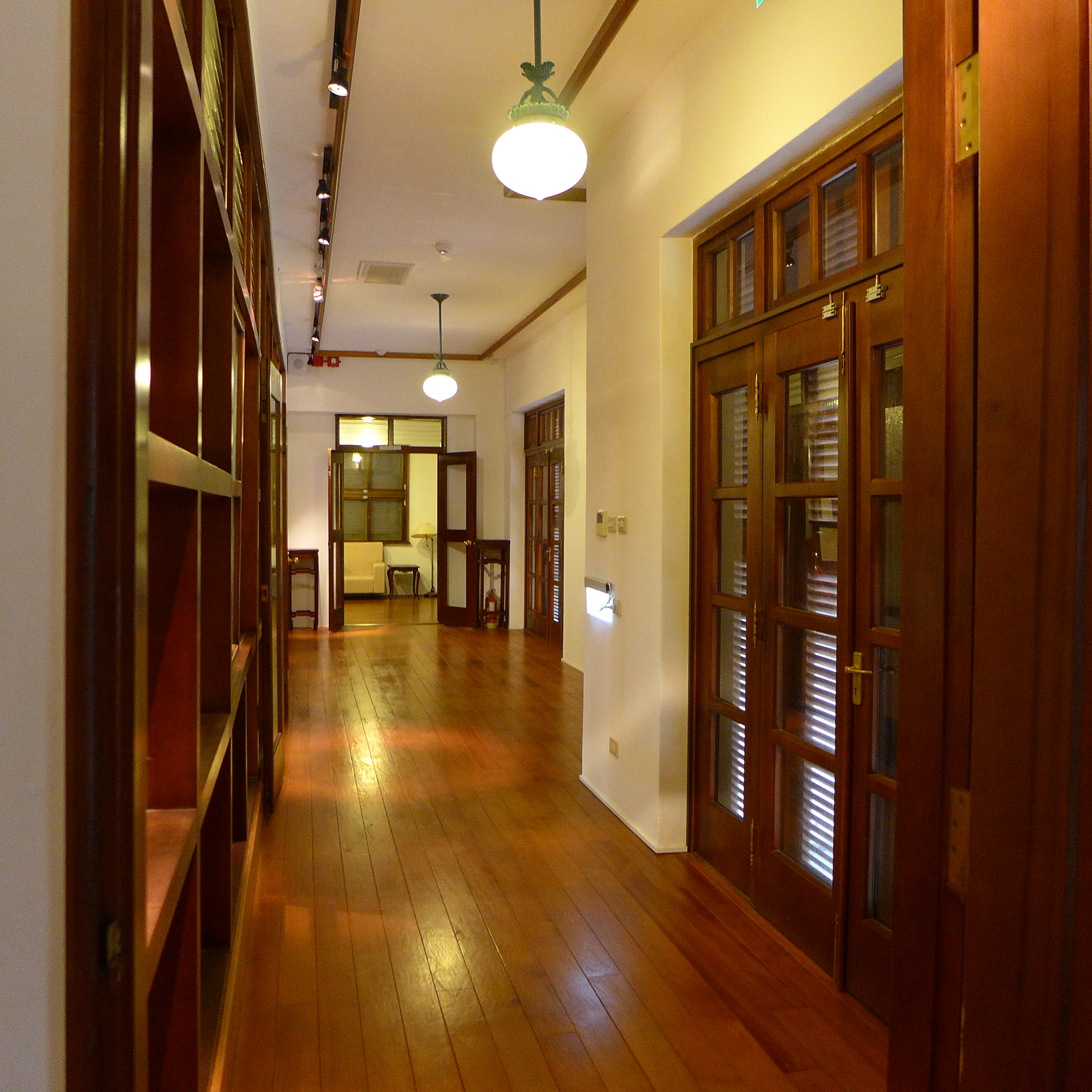
Building interior

The First Guesthouse (traditional Chinese: 第一賓館; simplified Chinese: 第一宾馆; pinyin: Dì Yī Bīnguǎn) is a historical building and former guesthouse of President Chiang Kai-shek in Magong City, Penghu County, Taiwan.

== History ==
In 1908, the Japanese government constructed the Matsushima Memorial Hall to commemorate the Imperial Japanese Army who perished in the Matsushima war. In 1912, a guest house was built and attached to the memorial hall which served as an accommodation building for the Japanese royal families and officials who visited the memorial. The building was them demolished to make way for the construction of fishing port.

The beam raising ceremony for the new building was held on 26 October 1942 and the building construction was completed in February 1943. On 17 May 1949, former ROC President Chiang Kai-shek flew to Penghu for the very first time and stayed at the guesthouse, hence it became one of his long-term guesthouses and was later renamed to the First Guesthouse. The building was declared a historic monument on 10 December 1998. In 2009, it underwent restoration for the main architecture and was reopened to the public on 18 May 2011.

== Architecture ==
The interior wall of the building was constructed by coral rock. There are many plants, trees and pavements on the courtyard as well. Additionally, there is huge grass plaza for star observation during the night.

== See also ==
- List of tourist attractions in Taiwan
- Guesthouses of Chiang Kai-shek
