= Mount Zhuzi =

Mountain in Northern New Taipei, Taiwan

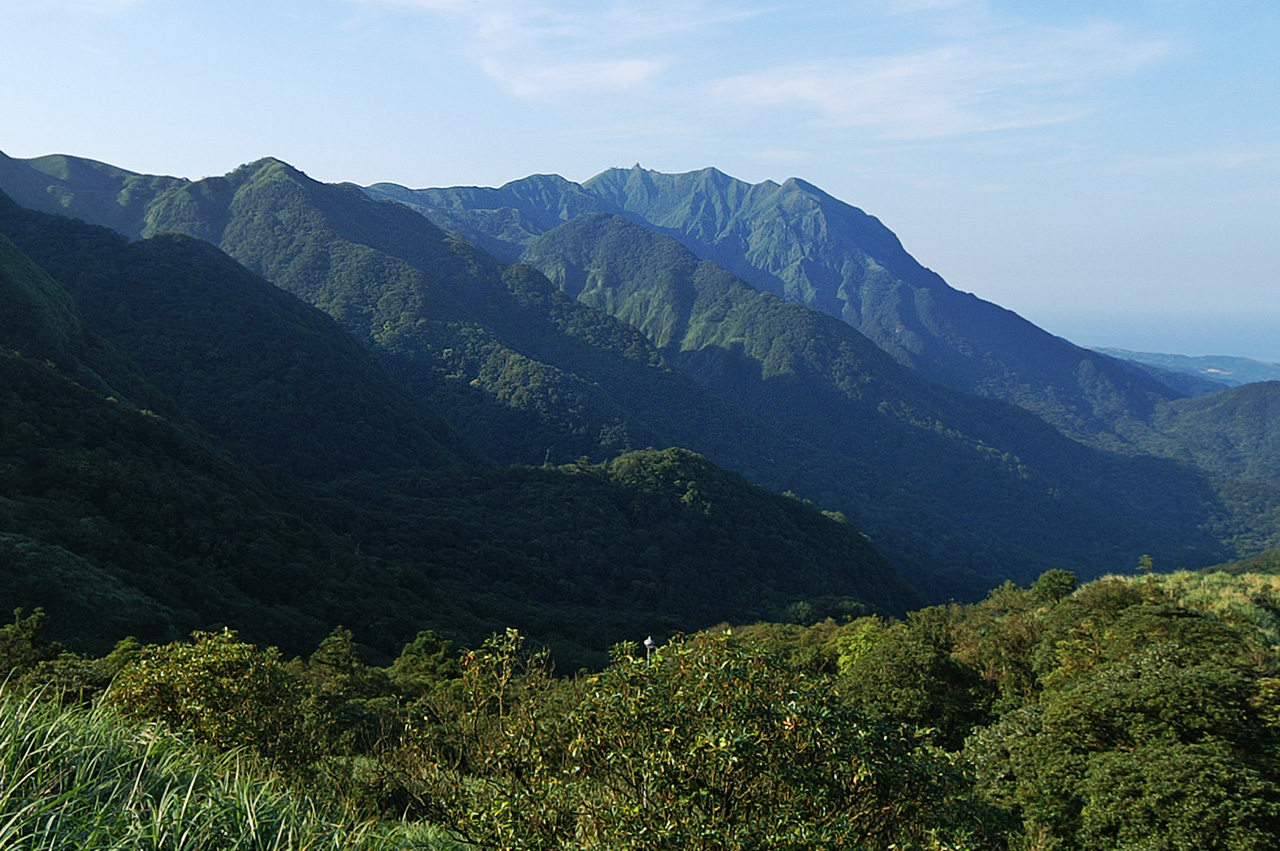

Highest point
- Elevation: 1,094 m (3,589 ft)
- Coordinates: 25°11′36″N 121°31′30″E

Geography
- Location within Taiwan
- Location: Sanzhi District, New Taipei City, Taiwan
- Parent range: Tatun Volcano Group

Geology
- Rock age(s): Pleistocene, 800,000 years ago
- Mountain type: Dormant volcano
- Last eruption: 500,000 years ago

Mount Zhuzi (Chinese: 竹子山; pinyin: zhuzishān), also called Zhuzi Shan Qianfeng, is a mountain in Sanzhi District, New Taipei City, Taiwan. Located on the Tatun Volcano Group, it stands at 1,094 m, making it the tallest peak in the city.
