= Chin Pao San =

Cemetery in Jinshan, New Taipei, Taiwan

- 金寶山
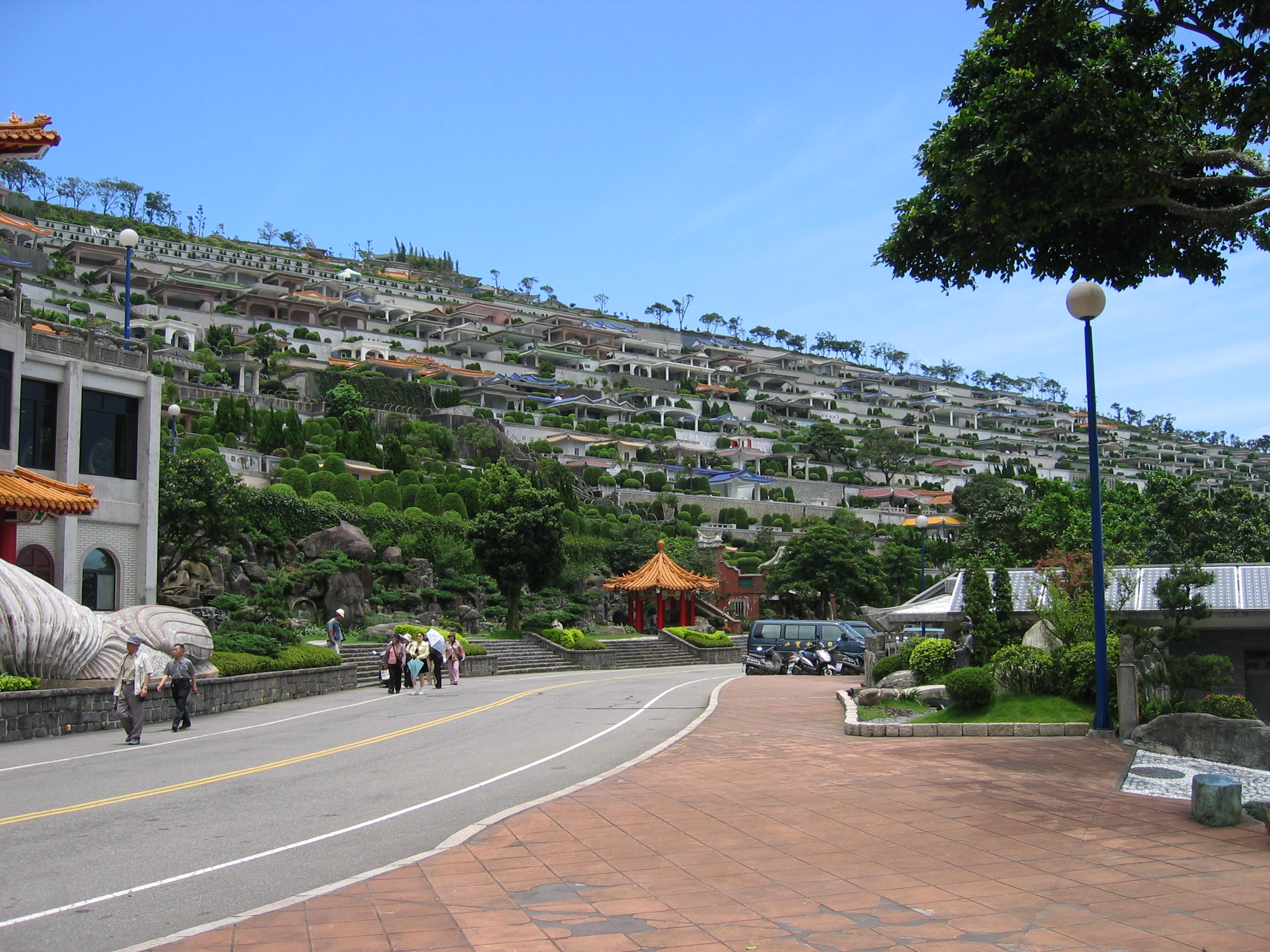
- Chin-Pao Mountain Cemetery hill, 2005
- Interactive map of Chin Pao San

Details
- Location: Jinshan District, New Taipei, Taiwan
- Coordinates: 25.251°N 121.604°E
- Type: Cemetery

Chin Pao San
- Traditional Chinese: 金寶山
- Literal meaning: Golden Treasure Mountain
Transcriptions
Standard Mandarin
- Hanyu Pinyin: Jīnbǎo Shān
- Wade–Giles: Chin1-pao3 Shan1

Chin Pao San (also Jinbaoshan, Jiongbaoshan Chinese: 金寶山; pinyin: Jīnbǎo Shān; lit. 'Golden Treasure Mountain') is a private cemetery located on a mountainside in Jinshan District, New Taipei, Taiwan. The site overlooks the Ju Ming Museum and, beyond it, the East China Sea.

Urns at Jinbaoshan are placed both indoors and outdoors. The site is accessible to visitors in wheelchairs.

Chin Pao San is famous for its abundant art. The grounds and interiors feature original works by a number of artists, including Ju Ming, the Taiwanese sculptor whose work represents the core of the collection at the adjacent museum. Sculpture at the site is modern in style and often symbolist in character. Many works are not overtly religious; of those that are, Buddhist and Taoist images are most numerous, though all major religions find representation at the site and one main building gives a prominent place to Christianity.

The most frequently visited gravesite belongs to Taiwanese singer Teresa Teng. Her memorial garden features a life-size statue and a large electronic keyboard set in the ground that can be played by visitors stepping on its keys.

== See also ==
- List of tourist attractions in Taiwan
