= Sihuangziping Pilot Geothermal Power Plant =

Geothermal power plant in Jinshan, New Taipei, Taiwan

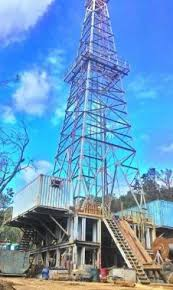
- Official name: 四磺子坪先導地熱發電廠
- Country: Taiwan
- Location: Jinshan, New Taipei, Taiwan
- Coordinates: 25°11′43.6″N 121°36′08.5″E
- Status: Under construction
- Commission date: October 2023
- Owner: New Taipei City Government

Power generation
- Nameplate capacity: 1 MW
- Annual net output: 6.4 GWh

The Sihuangziping Pilot Geothermal Power Plant (traditional Chinese: 四磺子坪先導地熱發電廠; simplified Chinese: 四磺子坪先导地热发电厂; pinyin: Sìhuángzipíng Xiāndǎo Dìrè Fādiànchǎng) is an upcoming geothermal power plant in Jinshan District, New Taipei, Taiwan. It is the first power plant in Taiwan powered by a volcano.

== History ==
The power plant will be commissioned by the end of October 2023.

== Technical specifications ==
The power plant received its energy sources from Tatun Volcanic Group. It has an installed capacity of 1 MW and can generate 6.4 GWh of electricity per year.

== See also ==
- Geothermal energy in Taiwan
- List of power stations in Taiwan
