= Datun Mountain =

Mountain in northern Taipei, Taiwan

- Datunshan
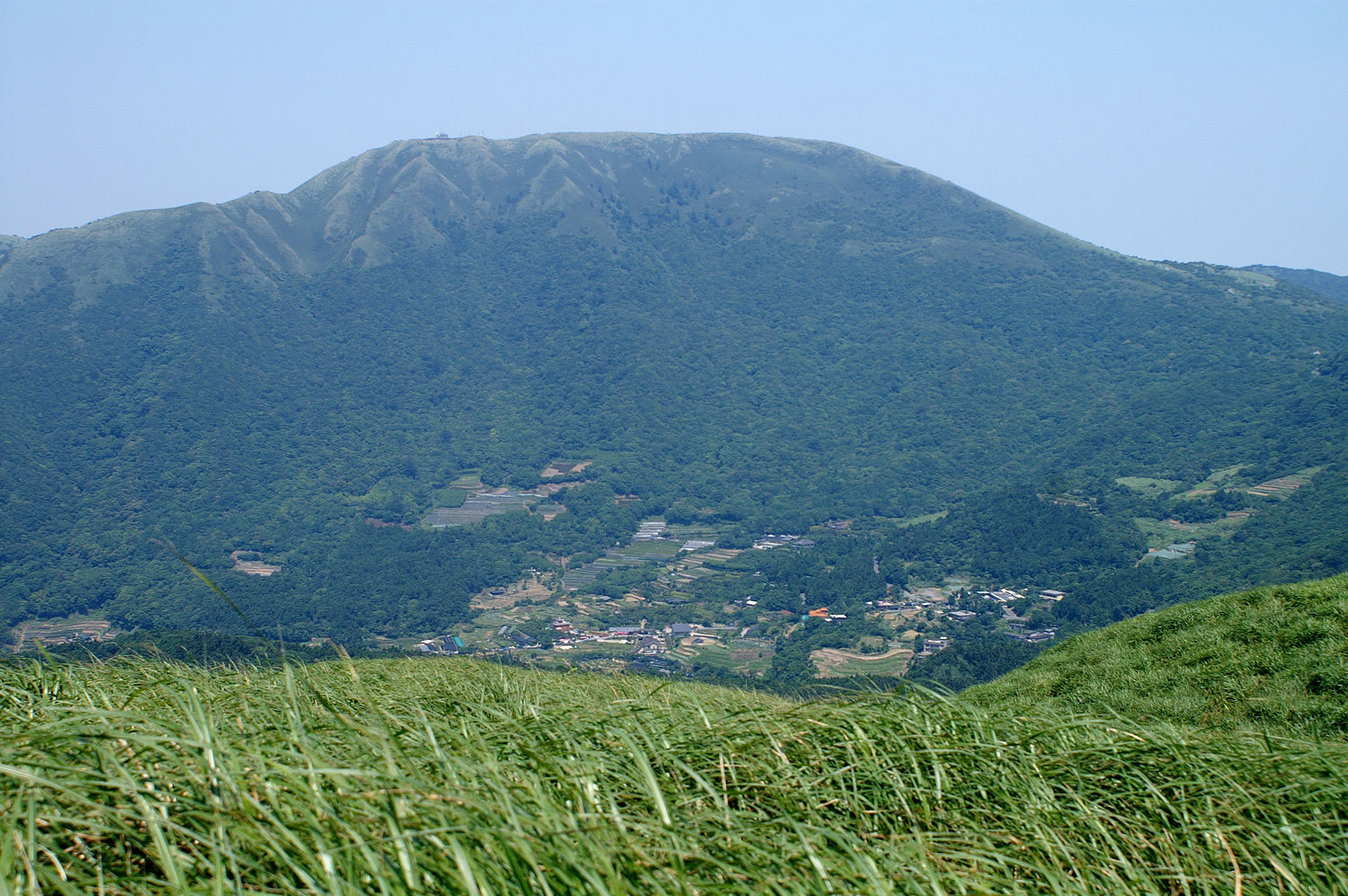

Highest point
- Elevation: 1,092 m (3,583 ft)
- Coordinates: 25°10′34″N 121°31′17″E

Geography
- Location within Taiwan
- Location: The border of Tamsui, New Taipei / Beitou, Taipei, Taiwan
- Parent range: Tatun Volcano Group

Climbing
- Easiest route: Datunshan Trail

Datun Mountain (Chinese: 大屯山; pinyin: Dà tún shān) is a mountain located in the Yangmingshan National Park. With a height of 1,092 m (3,583 ft), it is the park's 3rd tallest mountain and is located in the Tatun Volcano Group. It is one of Taiwan's two active volcanoes, with the other being on Guishan Island off the coast of Yilan.

== History ==
The mountain first erupted 2.5 million years ago, while 700,000 years later, another eruption split the mountain into multiple peaks. The latest eruption occurred 5,000-6,000 years ago.

== Climbing ==
The shortest path to the mountain is via the Bailaka highway and Datunshan Trail from the north. It has an elevation gain of 247 m (810 ft) and takes around 1.5–2 hours round-trip.
