= Twin Candlestick Islets =

Islets in Jinshan, New Taipei, Taiwan

Twin Candlestick Islets 蠋臺雙嶼

- Taiwan

Geography
- Location: Jinshan, New Taipei, Taiwan
- Coordinates: 25°13′58.2″N 121°39′16.4″E
- Total islands: 2
- Highest elevation: 60 m (200 ft)

The Twin Candlestick Islets (traditional Chinese: 蠋臺雙嶼; simplified Chinese: 蠋台双屿; pinyin: Zhútái Shuāng Yǔ) are islets in Jinshan District, New Taipei, Taiwan.

== History ==
The islets were once part of Jinshan Cape. Due to the continuous movement of tectonics plates and coastal erosion, they separated from the island of Taiwan. Initially they were a single rock arch, but the top collapsed thus made them look like two candlesticks.

== Geology ==
The islets are located 450 meters off the coast of Jinshan Cape. The highest elevation of the islets is 60 meters.

== See also ==
- List of islands of Taiwan
