= Jinshan District, New Taipei =

District in New Taipei, Taiwan

Jinshan 金山區 Kanayama
- District
- Jinshan District
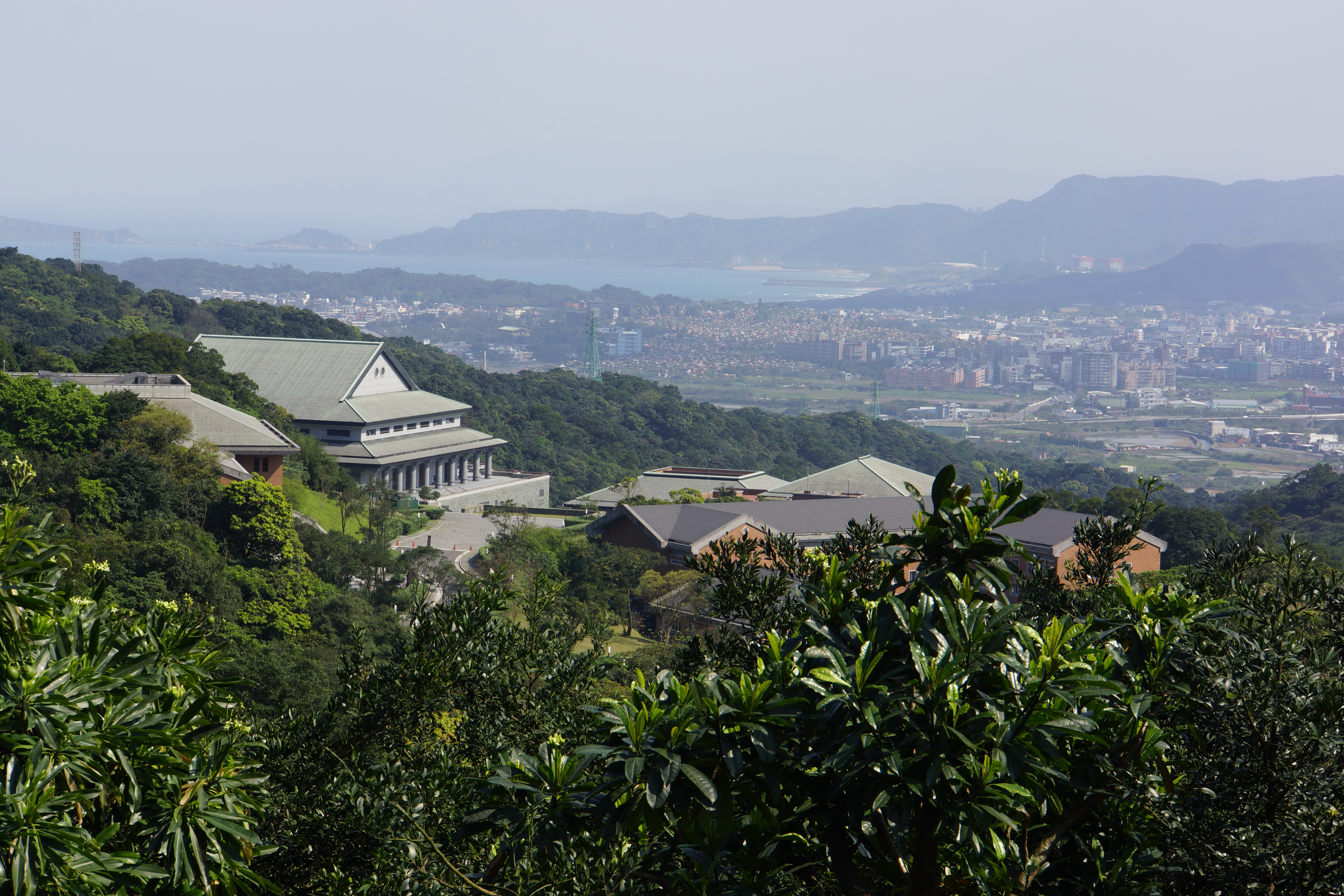

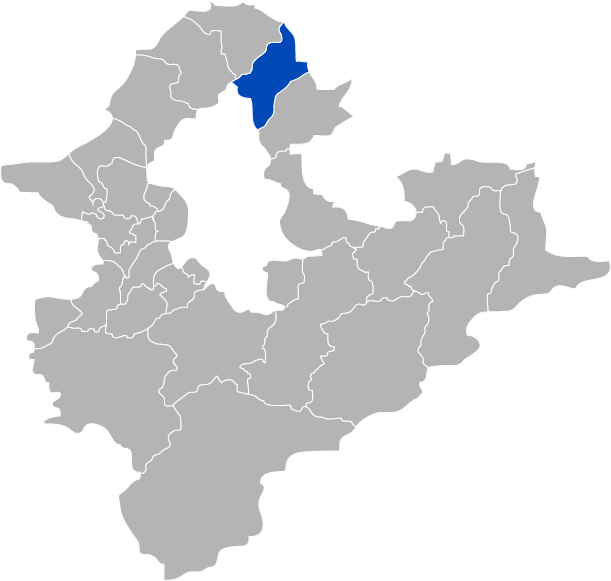
- Jinshan District in New Taipei City
- Coordinates: 25°14′10″N 121°37′03″E
- Country: Republic of China (Taiwan)
- Region: Northern Taiwan
- Special municipality: New Taipei City (新北市)

Area
  - Total: 49.21 km^{2} (19.00 sq mi)

Population (March 2023)
  - Total: 20,551
  - Density: 418/km^{2} (1,080/sq mi)
- Time zone: UTC+8 (CST)
- Postal code: 208
- Website: www.jinshan.ntpc.gov.tw (in Chinese)

Jinshan District
- Chinese: 金山區
- Literal meaning: Golden Mountain
Transcriptions
Standard Mandarin
- Hanyu Pinyin: Jīnshān Qū
- Bopomofo: ㄐㄧㄣ ㄕㄢ ㄑㄩ
- Tongyong Pinyin: Jinshan Cyu
Hakka
- Romanization: Kîm-sân Khî
Southern Min
- Hokkien POJ: Kim-san Khu

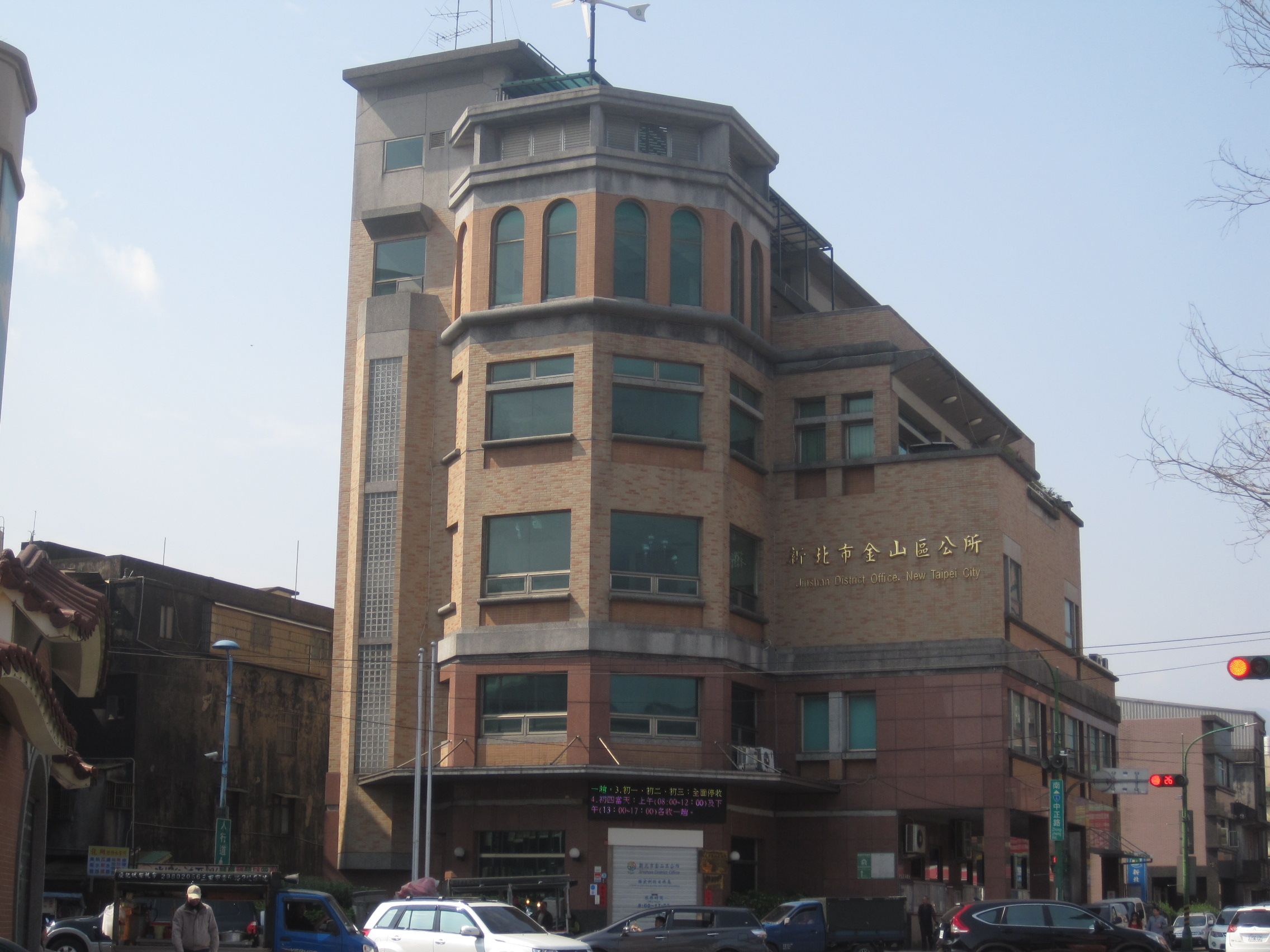
Jinshan District office

Jinshan District (Chinese: 金山區) is a rural district on the coast in northern New Taipei, Taiwan. The district draws many visitors each year because of its hot springs and its proximity to Chin Pao San and the Ju Ming Museum. The district is home to the Dharma Drum Buddhist College, an institution of higher learning founded by Dharma Drum Mountain monastics devoted to the principles of Zen Buddhism.

== Name Origin ==
This area was originally a Ketagalan settlement, called "Ki-ppare" (Basay: Quimourije), meaning "bumper harvest". This was later adapted as Kimpauli (金包里; Pe̍h-ōe-jī: Kim-pau-lí), the choice of characters perhaps influenced by the discovery of golden dust in the Sulfur creeks. In 1920 during Japanese rule, the area was renamed Kanayama Village (金山庄), Kīrun District (基隆郡), Taihoku Prefecture.

== Qingshui Wetland ==
Adjacent to Jinshan town at the north-west is a lowland wetland formed by alluvial deposits from Sulphur Creek (磺溪), Xishi Creek (西勢溪) and Qingshui Creek (清水溪). It is the last resting point in Taiwan for many migratory birds heading north during Spring and the first in the country for those heading south during Autumn. It has also served as habitat for rare vagrants such as the critically endangered Siberian Crane (Leucogeranus leucogeranus) and endangered Red-Crowned Crane (Grus japonensis).

== Geography ==
- Area: 49.21 km^{2}
- Population: 20,551 people (March 2023)

== Education ==
- Jinshan Senior High School (grades 7-12)
- Jinshan Elementary School
- Zhongjiao National Elementary School
- Sanhe National Elementary School
- Jinmeimin Elementary School

== Tourist attractions ==
- Chin Pao San
- Ju Ming Museum
- Twin Candlestick Islets
- Yangmingshan National Park

== Infrastructure ==
- Sihuangziping Pilot Geothermal Power Plant

== Notable natives ==
- Lee Hong-chi, actor

== Climate ==
Climate data for Jinshan District, New Taipei (2010–2023 normals, extremes 2010–present)
Month	Jan	Feb	Mar	Apr	May	Jun	Jul	Aug	Sep	Oct	Nov	Dec	Year
Record high °C (°F)	26.3 (79.3)	30.2 (86.4)	31.1 (88.0)	33.7 (92.7)	35.6 (96.1)	37.9 (100.2)	37.7 (99.9)	40.2 (104.4)	38.4 (101.1)	34.8 (94.6)	31.8 (89.2)	29.8 (85.6)	40.2 (104.4)
Mean daily maximum °C (°F)	18.1 (64.6)	18.8 (65.8)	21.1 (70.0)	24.6 (76.3)	27.7 (81.9)	31.1 (88.0)	33.9 (93.0)	33.6 (92.5)	31.0 (87.8)	26.4 (79.5)	23.4 (74.1)	19.3 (66.7)	25.8 (78.4)
Daily mean °C (°F)	15.4 (59.7)	15.7 (60.3)	17.4 (63.3)	20.5 (68.9)	23.9 (75.0)	27.0 (80.6)	28.9 (84.0)	28.7 (83.7)	26.8 (80.2)	23.6 (74.5)	20.8 (69.4)	16.8 (62.2)	22.1 (71.8)
Mean daily minimum °C (°F)	13.2 (55.8)	13.2 (55.8)	14.4 (57.9)	17.4 (63.3)	21.0 (69.8)	23.8 (74.8)	25.2 (77.4)	25.1 (77.2)	23.7 (74.7)	21.3 (70.3)	18.5 (65.3)	14.5 (58.1)	19.3 (66.7)
Record low °C (°F)	3.4 (38.1)	5.1 (41.2)	6.3 (43.3)	9.4 (48.9)	13.2 (55.8)	16.7 (62.1)	22.5 (72.5)	20.9 (69.6)	18.3 (64.9)	13.4 (56.1)	9.6 (49.3)	4.5 (40.1)	3.4 (38.1)
Average precipitation mm (inches)	247.4 (9.74)	281.5 (11.08)	240.7 (9.48)	208.2 (8.20)	319.8 (12.59)	301.9 (11.89)	114.6 (4.51)	170.2 (6.70)	278.4 (10.96)	224.4 (8.83)	245.3 (9.66)	289.2 (11.39)	2,921.6 (115.03)
Average precipitation days	17.7	16.6	16.5	14.6	14.7	12.5	7.7	10.3	12.2	13.6	15.9	17.4	169.7
Average relative humidity (%)	84.0	86.9	85.5	84.5	86.6	84.4	78.3	80.0	81.6	82.1	85.1	83.6	83.6
Mean monthly sunshine hours	60.7	51.1	81.7	93.0	113.4	125.0	204.7	201.7	146.1	97.2	60.2	43.7	1,278.5
Source 1: Central Weather Administration (sun 1995–2008)
Source 2: Atmospheric Science Research and Application Databank (precipitation 1995–2020, precipitation days and humidity 2000–2024)

== See also ==
- New Taipei
