= Qixing Mountain (Taipei) =

Mountain in Beitou, Taipei, Taiwan

Coordinates: 25°10′15″N 121°33′12″E

- Chihsing Mountain, Cising Mountain

Highest point
- Elevation: 1,120 m (3,670 ft)
- Prominence: 1,059 m (3,474 ft)
- Listing: Ribu

Naming
- Native name: 七星山 (Chinese)

Geography
- Location: Beitou, Taipei, Taiwan
- Parent range: Datun Volcano Group

Geology
- Rock age: Pleistocene
- Mountain type: Lava dome
- Last eruption: 700,000 BC

Qixing Mountain, also spelled Cising Mountain or Chihsing Mountain, (Chinese: 七星山; Hanyu Pinyin: Qīxīng Shān; Tongyong Pinyin: Cising Shan; Wade–Giles: Ch'i^{1}-Hsing^{1} Shan^{1}; lit. 'Seven Star Mountain') is a mountain in Beitou District, Taipei, Taiwan. It is located within the Tatun Volcanic Group and is the highest mountain in the city, at the rim of Taipei Basin. It is also the highest (dormant) volcano in Taiwan. It is located in the center of Yangmingshan National Park; its main peak is 1,120 meters (3,670 ft) above sea level.

It began erupting about 700,000 years ago. There was a crater at the peak but it became seven small peaks due to post-eruption erosion.

The mountain has faults running across the southeast and northwest contours, and has volcanic landforms such as hot springs and fumaroles.

Shamao Mountain is a round volcanic dome that looks like a black gauze cap. As the lava was more viscous when the mountain was formed, it gradually became a tholoid, also known as a cumulo-dome volcano, it is 643 meters (2,110 ft) above sea level. Shamaoshan and Cigushan (七股山, 890 meters (2,920 ft)) are parasitic volcanoes of Qixingshan.

This mountain is the source of the name for Shichisei District, Taihoku Prefecture, Taiwan under Japanese rule. This district included modern day Xizhi, Shilin, Beitou, Nangang, Neihu, Songshan, and Xinyi.

== See also ==
- List of mountains in Taiwan
