= Yangmingshan =

National park in northern Taiwan

Yangmingshan National Park
- IUCN category II (national park)
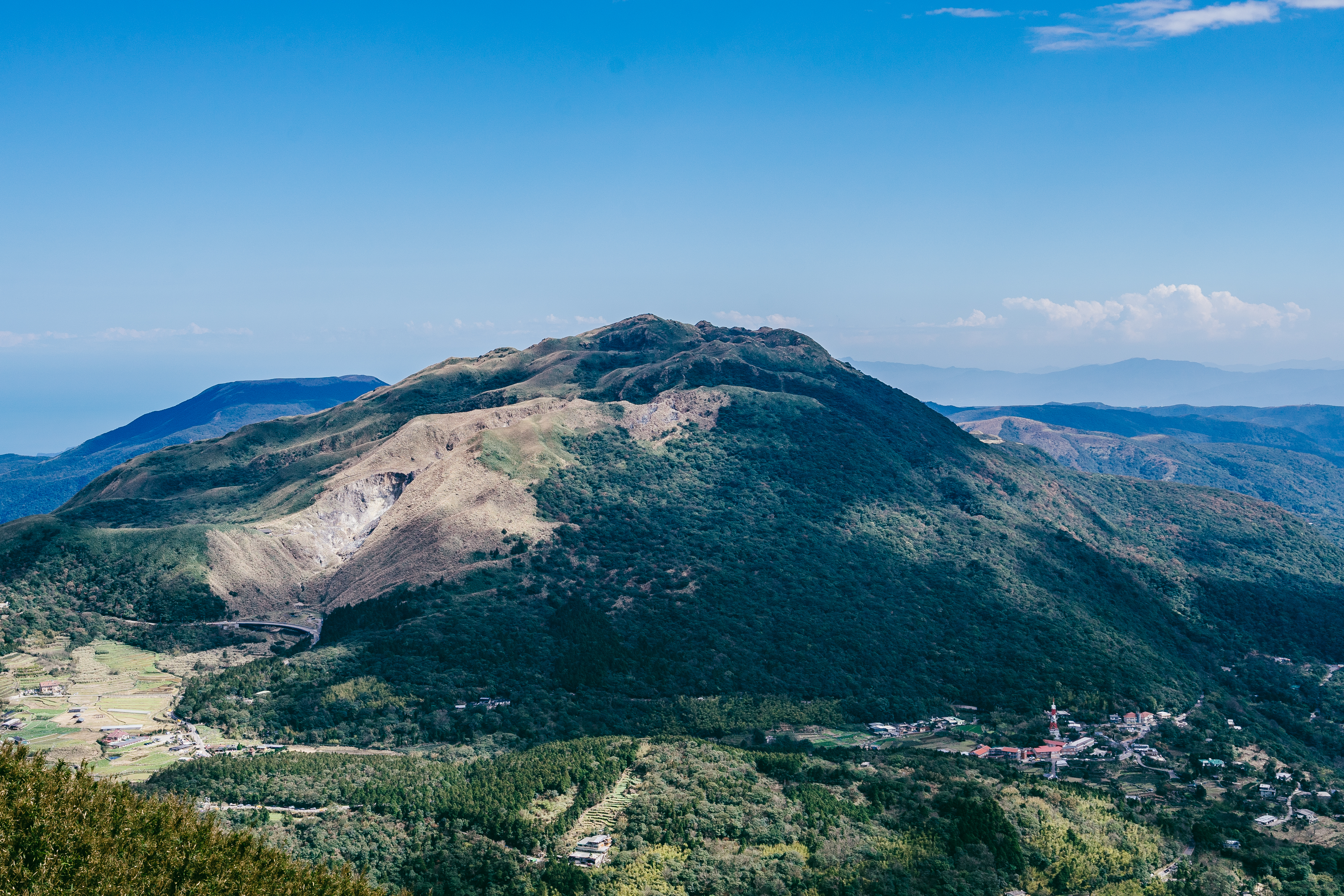
- Seven Star Mountain with hot springs on the side

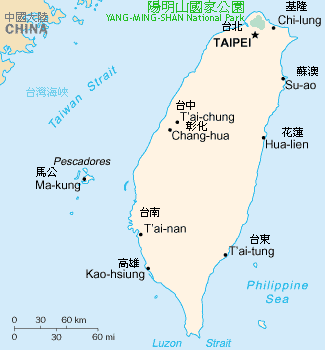
- Location of Yangmingshan National Park
- Location: Taiwan
- Nearest city: Taipei (majority of park within city limits)
- Coordinates: 25°10′39″N 121°32′51″E
- Area: 113.38 km^{2} (43.78 sq mi)
- Established: September 16, 1985
- Governing body: Yangmingshan National Park Headquarters, National Park Service, Ministry of the Interior, Taiwan
- Website: www.ymsnp.gov.tw

Yangmingshan
- Traditional Chinese: 陽明山國家公園
- Simplified Chinese: 阳明山国家公园
Transcriptions
Standard Mandarin
- Hanyu Pinyin: Yángmíngshān Guójiā Gōngyuán
Southern Min
- Hokkien POJ: Iûⁿ-bêng-soaⁿ Kok-ka Kong-hn̂g

Yangmingshan National Park, located in both Taipei and New Taipei City, is one of the nine national parks in Taiwan. The districts that are partially in the park include Taipei's Beitou and Shilin Districts; and New Taipei's Wanli, Jinshan, Sanzhi and Tamsui Districts. The national park is known for its cherry blossoms, hot springs, sulfur deposits, fumaroles, venomous snakes, and hiking trails, including Taiwan's tallest dormant volcano, Qixing (Seven Star) Mountain rising to 1,120 m (3,675 ft). In June 2020, Yangmingshan National Park was certified as the world's first Urban Quiet Park Quiet Parks International in recognition of World Environment Day.

== History ==
This mountain range was originally called "Grass Mountain" (Chinese: 草山; Pe̍h-ōe-jī: Chháu-soaⁿ) during the Qing dynasty, in reference to the Datun Mountain (大屯山; Tōa-tūn-soaⁿ). Officials during this period were worried about thieves stealing sulfur from the rich sulfur deposits in the area, so they would regularly set fire to the mountain. Thus, only grass and no trees could be seen.

Daiton National Park, Taiwan's first national park, was established on 27 December 1937. It was one of three national parks designated by Governor-General of Taiwan Seizō Kobayashi during Japanese rule.

In 1950, President Chiang Kai-shek renamed Grass Mountain to Yangmingshan to commemorate the Ming dynasty scholar Wang Yangming. In 1962, the then Taiwan Provincial Bureau of Public Works began to plan the Yangmingshan National Park. The initial planning area was 28,400 hectares, including Mount Kwan-in and the Tatun Volcanic Group.

== Landscape and geology ==
Unlike most other national parks, the Yangmingshan National Park has a lower elevation. Although the park's elevation ranges from only 200–1120 meters, varied landscapes such as ridges, valleys, lakes, waterfalls, and basins are abundant. Andesite rocks make up most of the area's geology.

== Xiaoyoukeng ==
Xiaoyoukeng (Chinese: 小油坑) is a post-volcanic geological landscape area located in the north of Taiwan in Yangmingshan National Park at the northwestern foot of Seven Star Mountain. It is approximately 805 meters above sea level and is famed for the fumaroles, sulfur crystals, hot springs and spectacular 'landslide terrain' formed by post-volcanic activity.

Hiking trails to Seven Star Mountain are accessible from the Xiaoyoukeng parking lot. The top of the trail is 1,120 meters above sea level, which is the highest peak of Taipei City. The Xiaoyoukeng trail can connect to Qixing Park, Menghuan Pond, and Lengshuikeng. The trail also connects to the visitor center, Yangmingshan Second Parking Lot, and the Yangmingshan Bus Station.

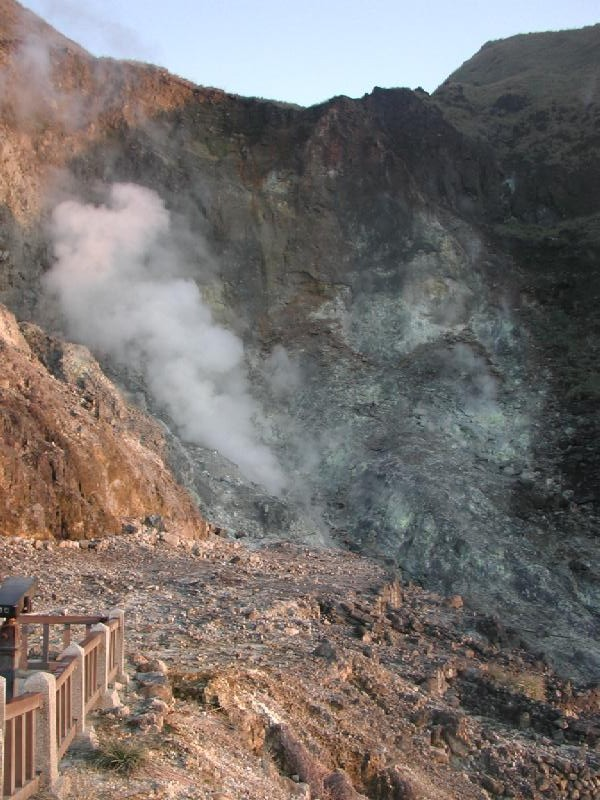
An active fumarole at Xiaoyoukeng.

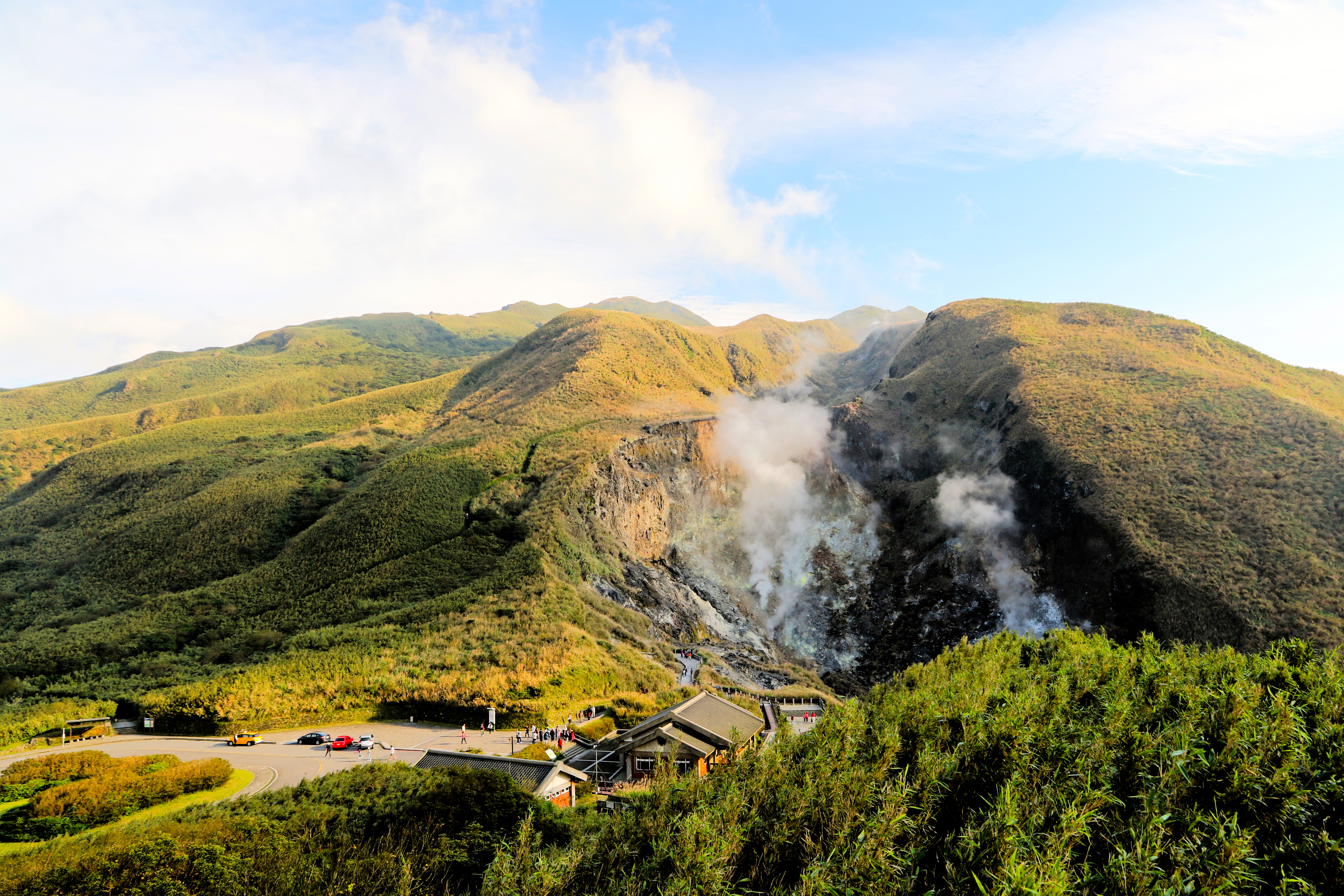
A distant view of the fumarole of Xiaoyoukeng.

== Flora and fauna ==
Due to the effects of post-volcanic activity and precipitation, soil in the region is highly acidic. With the influence of the northeast monsoon and the area's microclimates, winter temperatures are much lower than in the surrounding areas. The above factors cause the vegetation to differ from those in other regions at the same latitude. Some medium and high-altitude plants can be found here such as bird-lime tree and hairy Japanese maple. Vegetation groups can be divided into subtropical monsoon rainforests, temperate evergreen broadleaf forests, and mountain ridge grasslands. There are 1360 species of vascular bundle plants in the region. Some of the common ones are red nanmu, large-leaved machilus, Formosan sweet gum, Taiwan cherry, Mori cleyera and dark spotted cherry. The most famous is Taiwan isoetes in Menghuan pond, an aquatic fern only found in Taiwan. Mt. Datun is one of the most well-known places to see some of the 168 species of butterflies in northern Taiwan, With them being most frequently seen from May to August. The most common ones are from the families Papilionidae, Danainae, and Nymphalidae. There are also 122 species of birds in the region. Semi-feral cattle are one of the notable attractions in the area.

== Climate ==
Yangmingshan has a humid subtropical climate (Köppen: Cfa). Summers are warm, humid, and accompanied by torrential rainstorms; while winters are cool, very wet, and very foggy due to the northeasterly winds from the vast Siberian High being intensified by the pooling of this cooler air in the Taipei Basin. Due to Taiwan's location in the Pacific Ocean, it is affected by the Pacific typhoon season, which occurs between June and October.

The following climate data is for the Anbu weather station. Other places in the national park may have different temperatures.

Climate data for Anbu, Yangmingshan National Park (1991-2020 normals, extremes 1943-present)
Month	Jan	Feb	Mar	Apr	May	Jun	Jul	Aug	Sep	Oct	Nov	Dec	Year
Record high °C (°F)	24.5 (76.1)	27.0 (80.6)	27.7 (81.9)	28.8 (83.8)	29.9 (85.8)	31.0 (87.8)	31.9 (89.4)	32.0 (89.6)	31.4 (88.5)	30.7 (87.3)	27.5 (81.5)	25.7 (78.3)	32.0 (89.6)
Mean daily maximum °C (°F)	13.3 (55.9)	14.6 (58.3)	17.1 (62.8)	20.5 (68.9)	23.2 (73.8)	25.6 (78.1)	27.4 (81.3)	26.8 (80.2)	24.3 (75.7)	20.5 (68.9)	18.1 (64.6)	14.6 (58.3)	20.5 (68.9)
Daily mean °C (°F)	10.3 (50.5)	11.2 (52.2)	13.2 (55.8)	16.6 (61.9)	19.6 (67.3)	22.2 (72.0)	23.4 (74.1)	23.0 (73.4)	21.1 (70.0)	17.9 (64.2)	15.4 (59.7)	11.8 (53.2)	17.1 (62.9)
Mean daily minimum °C (°F)	8.1 (46.6)	8.7 (47.7)	10.3 (50.5)	13.7 (56.7)	17.2 (63.0)	19.9 (67.8)	20.9 (69.6)	20.7 (69.3)	19.1 (66.4)	16.3 (61.3)	13.5 (56.3)	9.8 (49.6)	14.9 (58.7)
Record low °C (°F)	−3.7 (25.3)	−2.4 (27.7)	−2.0 (28.4)	1.0 (33.8)	8.1 (46.6)	11.4 (52.5)	16.6 (61.9)	15.5 (59.9)	12.6 (54.7)	6.0 (42.8)	1.1 (34.0)	−1.6 (29.1)	−3.7 (25.3)
Average precipitation mm (inches)	296.7 (11.68)	291.3 (11.47)	246.7 (9.71)	222.3 (8.75)	334.0 (13.15)	341.1 (13.43)	230.9 (9.09)	400.8 (15.78)	724.6 (28.53)	683.6 (26.91)	502.5 (19.78)	422.6 (16.64)	4,697.1 (184.92)
Average precipitation days (≥ 0.1 mm)	21.2	18.3	18.3	15.8	15.6	14.3	9.7	13.1	16.3	20.1	20.9	21.4	205.0
Average relative humidity (%)	92.1	91.5	89.8	88.4	87.5	87.8	85.8	87.5	89.0	91.0	92.0	92.2	89.6
Mean monthly sunshine hours	59.0	58.7	78.1	77.2	79.6	85.2	138.4	124.7	96.0	61.5	51.4	46.6	956.4
Source: Central Weather Bureau

== Historical and cultural sites ==
- Chinese Culture University
- Chung-Shan Building - Meeting place of the now defunct National Assembly of the Republic of China
- Grass Mountain Chateau - Summer residence of Chiang Kai-shek
- Guangfu Building - Built in 1971 in Northern Chinese palace-style architecture to commemorate the Xinhai Revolution.
- Home and grave of famous writer Lin Yutang
- Yangmingshuwu - Former Kuomintang Party Archives
- Yangmingshan American Military Housing
- Yangmingshan No.1 Public Cemetery - Contains the graves of Sun Fo and Homer Lea.
  - Tomb of Puru, painter, educator, and cousin of China's last emperor Puyi.
- Taipei European School
- Tomb of Yu Youren
- Wuchih Mountain Military Cemetery

== Gallery ==
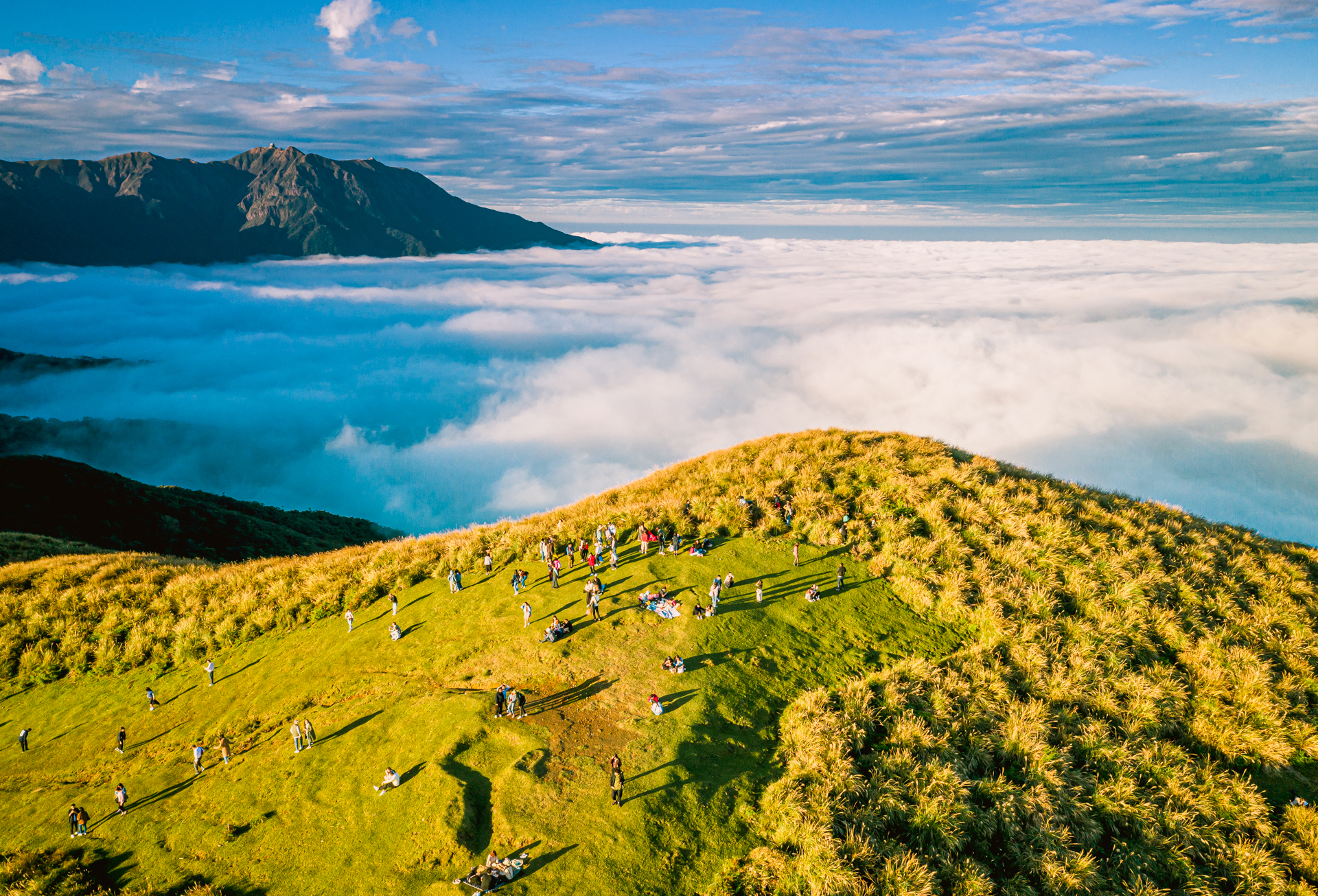
Qingtiangang.

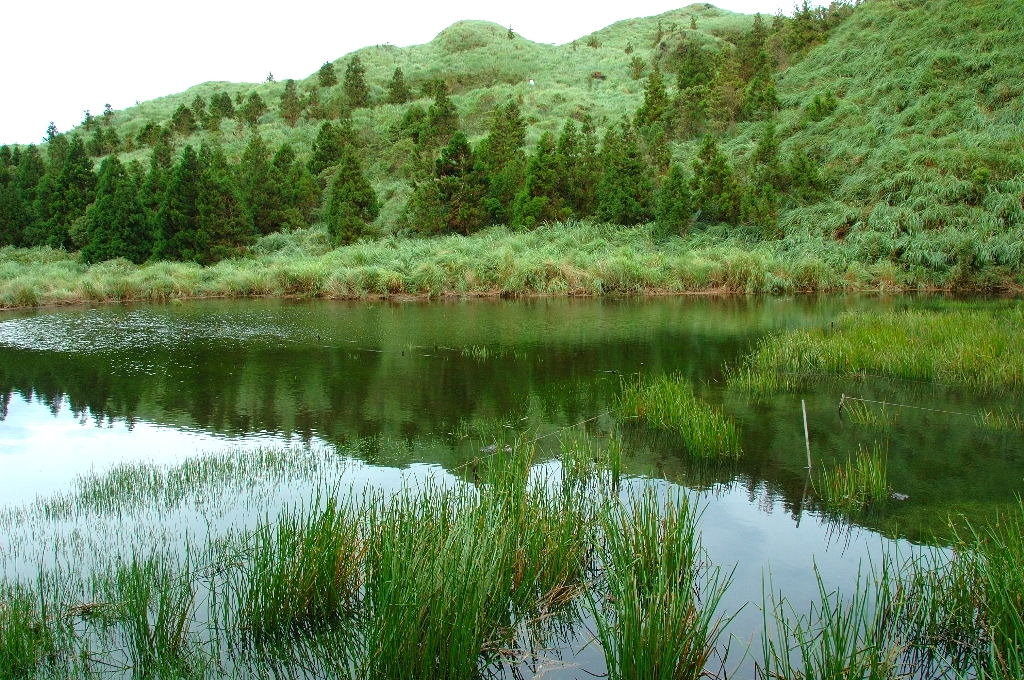
Dream Lake.

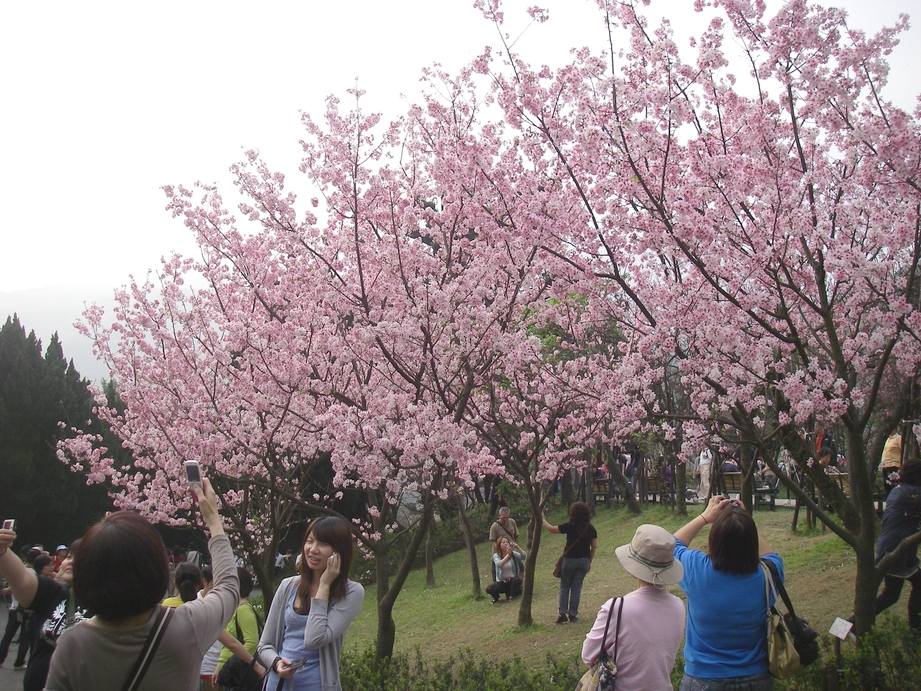
Cherry Blossom

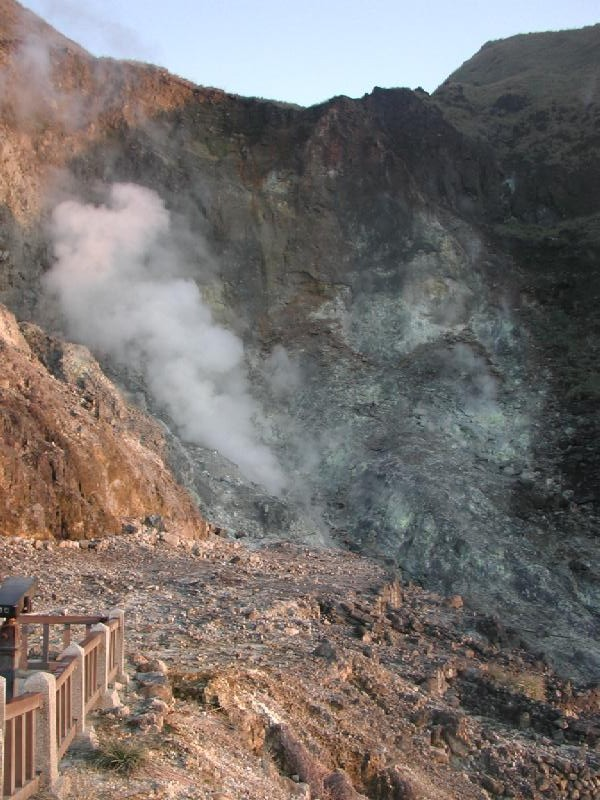
Closer view of fumarole on Seven Star Mountain.

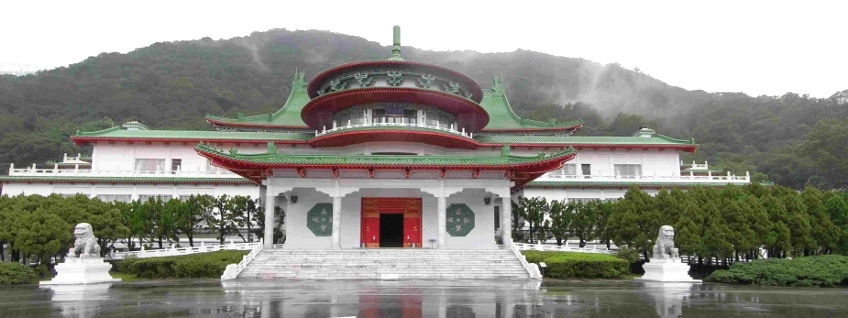
Chung-Shan Building in Yangmingshan.

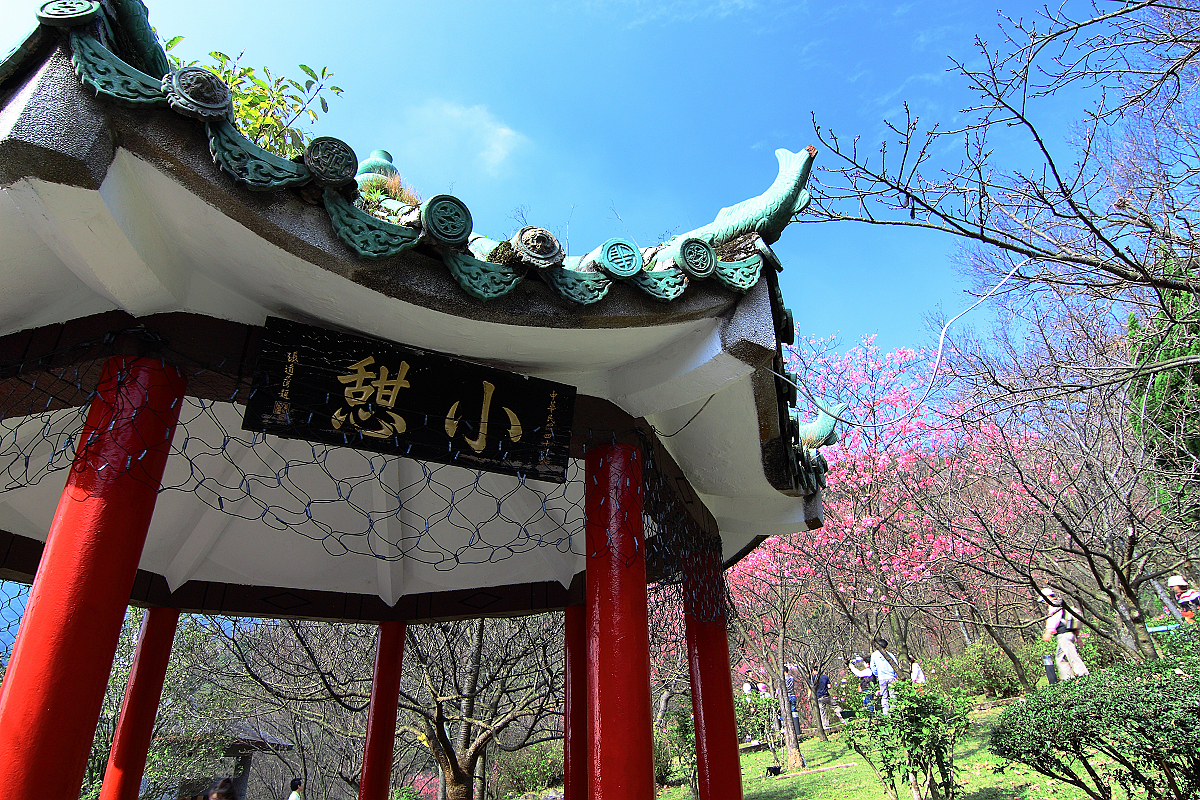
Chinese Pavilion and Cherry Blossom.

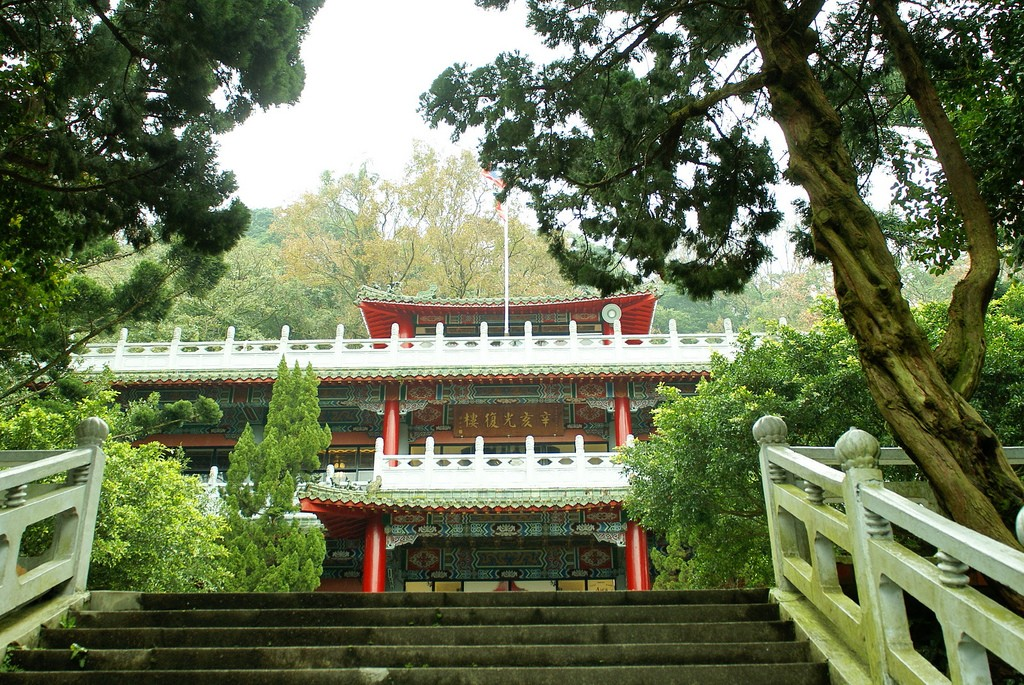
Guangfu Building.

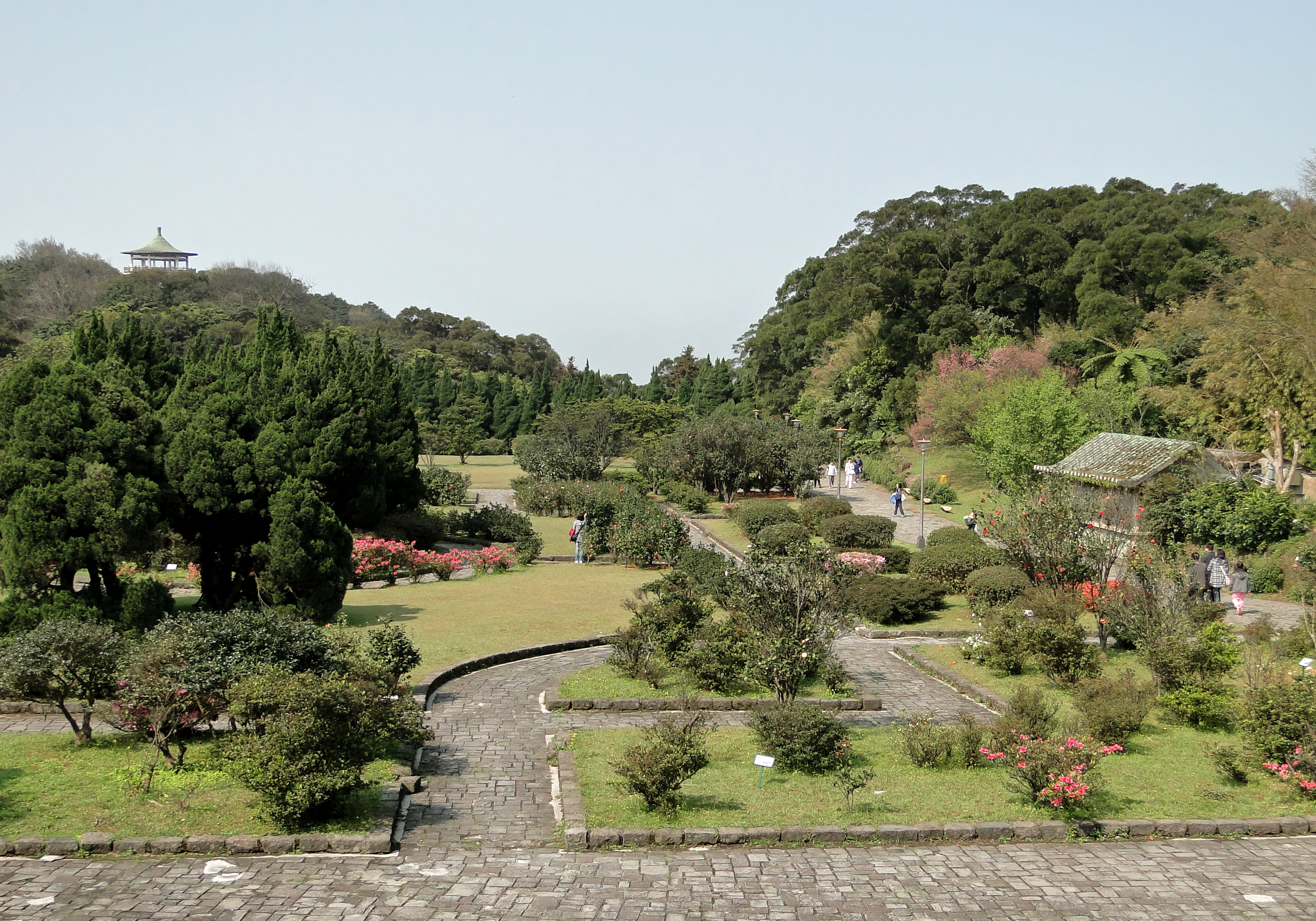
A park near the entrance.

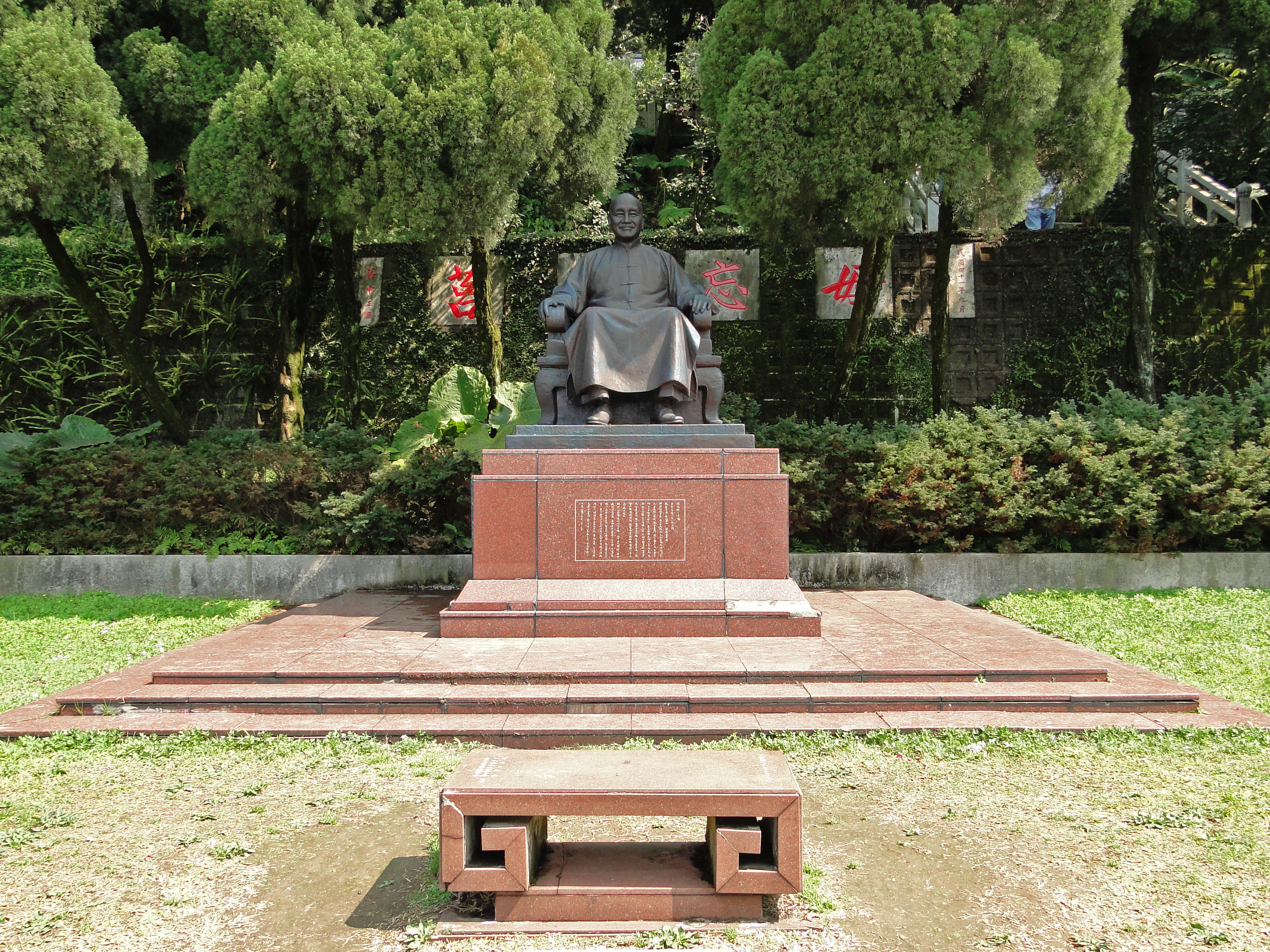
Statue of Chiang Kai-shek in the park.

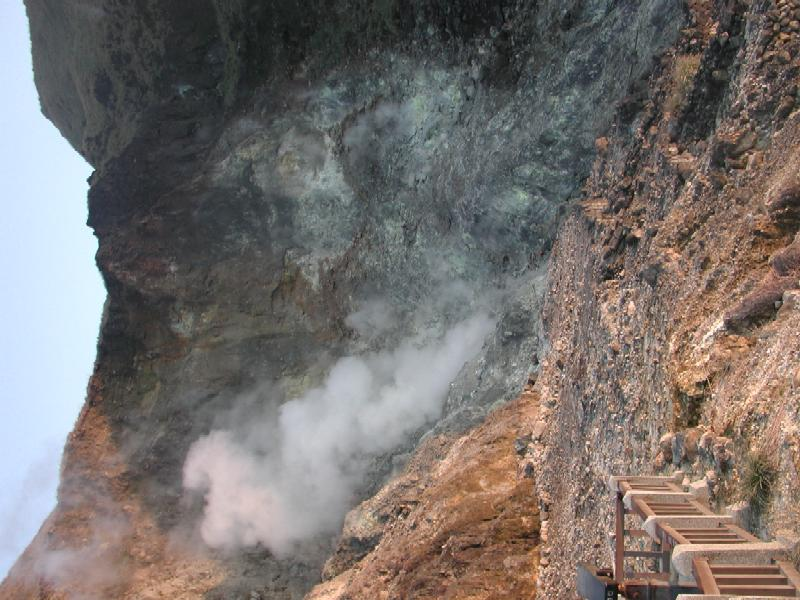
Yangmingshan hot springs

== See also ==
- List of national parks in Taiwan
- Tatun Volcano Group
- Qixing Mountain (Taipei)
- Yellowstone National Park
