= Mount Guanyin (New Taipei) =

Mountain in Wugu, New Taipei, Taiwan

- Mount Kwan-in
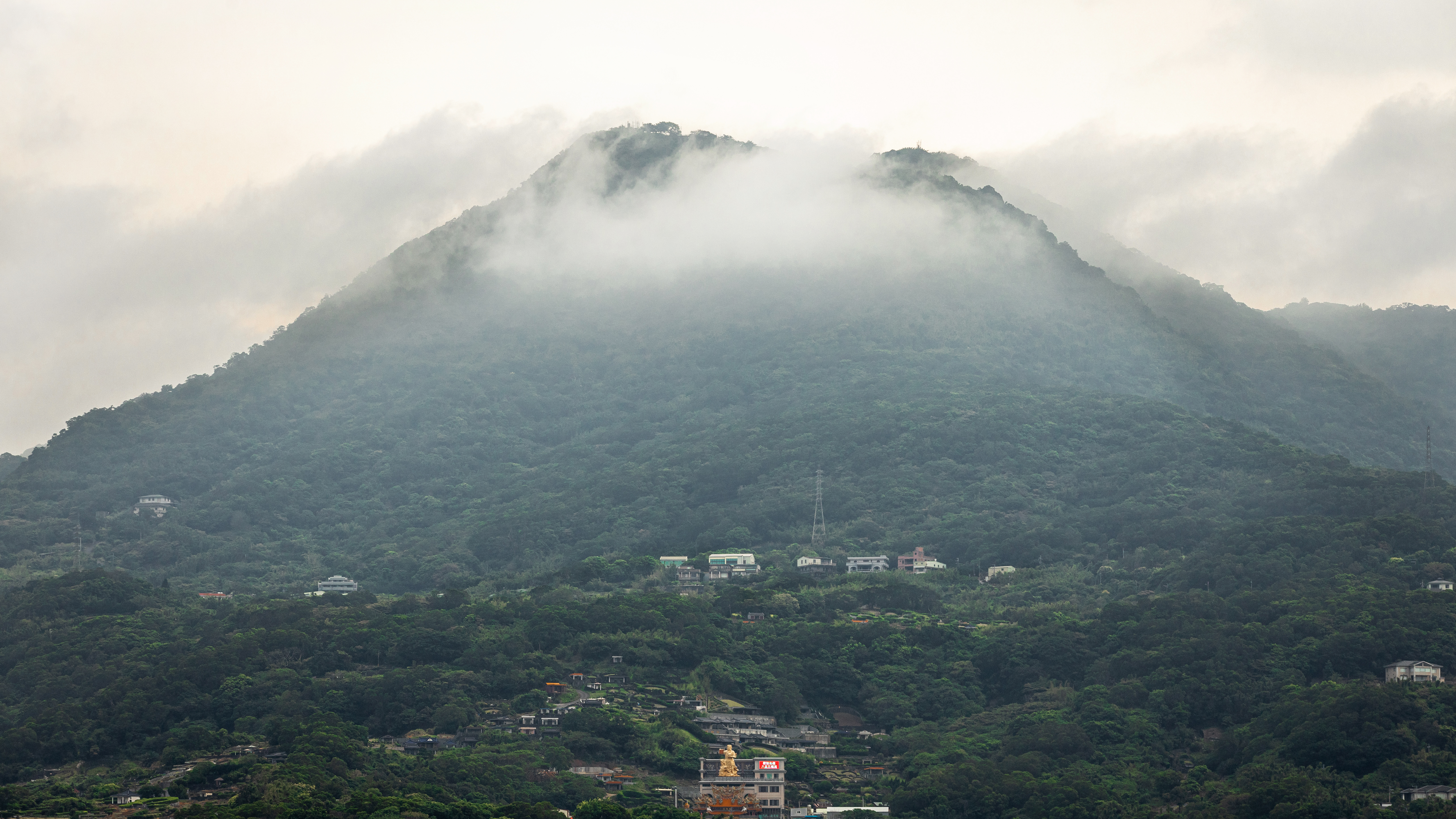
- Mount Guanyin in July 2023

Highest point
- Elevation: 616 m (2,021 ft)
- Coordinates: 25°08′11″N 121°25′39″E

Naming
- Native name: 觀音山 (Chinese)

Geography
- Location: Wugu, New Taipei City, Taiwan

Mount Guanyin, Mount Kwan-in, or Kwaninshan (traditional Chinese: 觀音山; simplified Chinese: 观音山; pinyin: Guānyīn Shān) is an inactive stratovolcano in Wugu District, New Taipei City, Taiwan.

== Name ==
The volcano is named after the feminine Bodhisattva of Compassion Guanyin.

== Geology ==
The mountain is an inactive volcano with a height of 616 meters.

== Facilities ==
There are nine hiking trails on the mountain for hikers to climb.

== See also ==
- List of tourist attractions in Taiwan
- List of mountains in Taiwan
