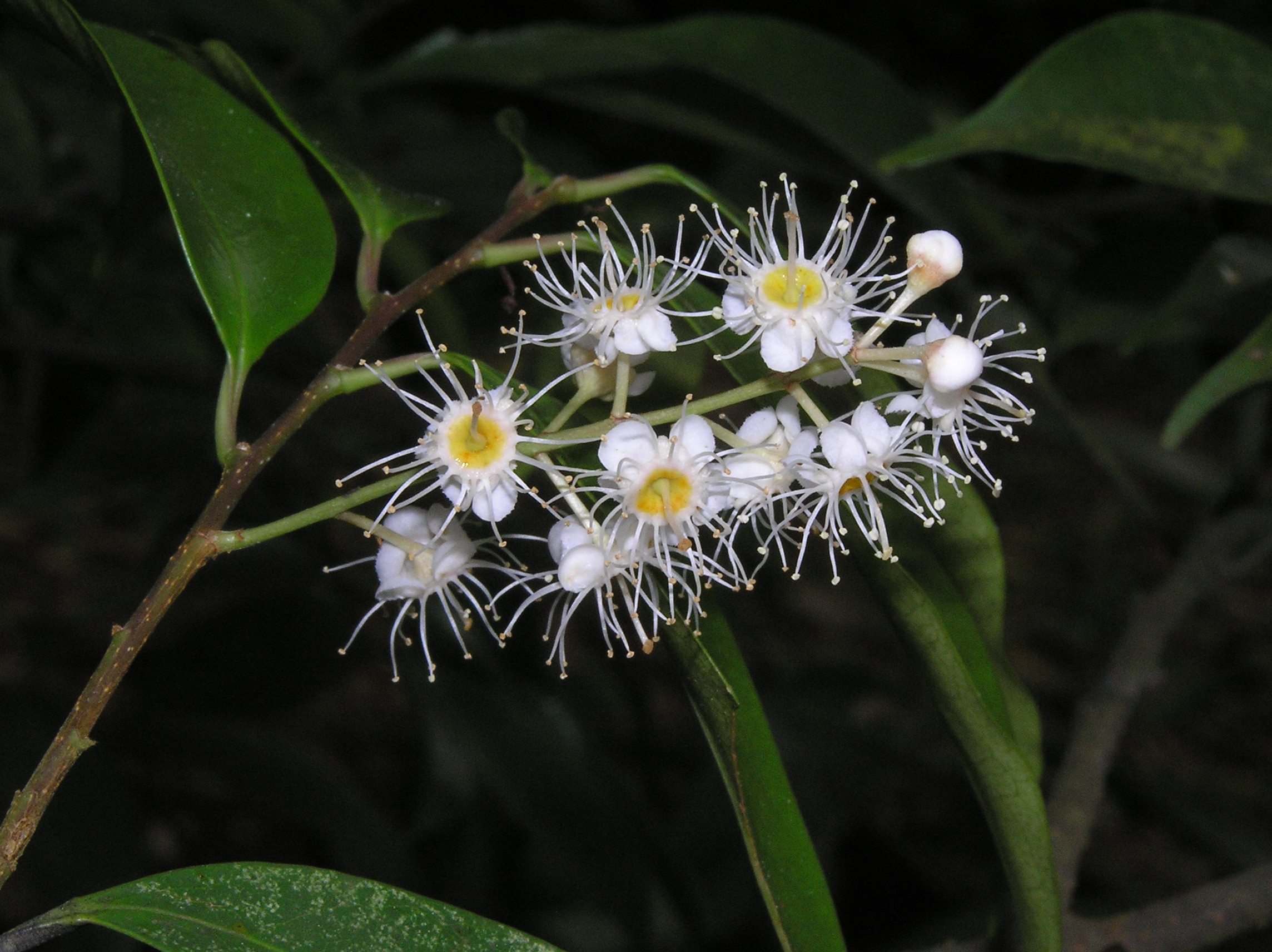

Scientific classification
- Kingdom: Plantae
- Clade: Tracheophytes
- Clade: Angiosperms
- Clade: Eudicots
- Clade: Rosids
- Order: Rosales
- Family: Rosaceae
- Genus: Prunus
- Section: P. sect. Laurocerasus
- Species: P. phaeosticta

Binomial name
- Prunus phaeosticta (Hance) Maxim.

Synonyms
- List: Cerasus punctata Hook.fil. & Thoms.; Laurocerasus phaeosticta (Hance) C.K.Schneid.; Lauro-cerasus phaeosticta (Hance) C.K.Schneid.; Prunus edentata Hand.-Mazz.; Prunus punctata Hook. f. & Thomson; Prunus xerocarpa Hemsl.; Pygeum phaeosticta Hance; Pygeum phaeostictum Hance

= Prunus phaeosticta =

Species of plant

Prunus phaeosticta, the dark-spotted cherry, is a species of plant native to China, Taiwan, and southeast Asia, including far eastern India, Bangladesh, Burma, Thailand, Laos and Vietnam. It gets its specific epithet and its common name from the small dark spots (glands) on the undersides of its leaves. Formosan rock macaques (Macaca cyclopis) eat the fruit.

== Subspecies and forms ==
A widespread species, it displays variety in its morphology, leading to a number of described putative subspecies, varieties and forms.

- P. phaeosticta f. pubipedunculata T.T. Yu & L.T. Lu
- P. phaeosticta f. ciliospinosa
- P. phaeosticta f. dentigera Rehder
- P. phaeosticta f. lasioclada Rehder
- P. phaeosticta f. phaeosticta
- P. phaeosticta f. puberula (Yü & Lu) Q.H.Chen
- P. phaeosticta subsp. ilicifolia (Hance) Maxim.
- P. phaeosticta subsp. phaeosticta
- P. phaeosticta var. ancylocarpa
- P. phaeosticta var. dimorphophylla
- P. phaeosticta var. promeccocarpa
