= Chu Feng =

Chu Feng is the name of:

- Feng Chu (Chinese: 储凤, born 1965), Chinese-French operations researcher, written as Chu Feng in eastern name order
- Frances Yao, born Chu Feng
- Zhu Feng, Chu Feng in Wade–Giles
