= Machangding Memorial Park =

Riverside park in Taipei, Taiwan

- 馬場町紀念公園
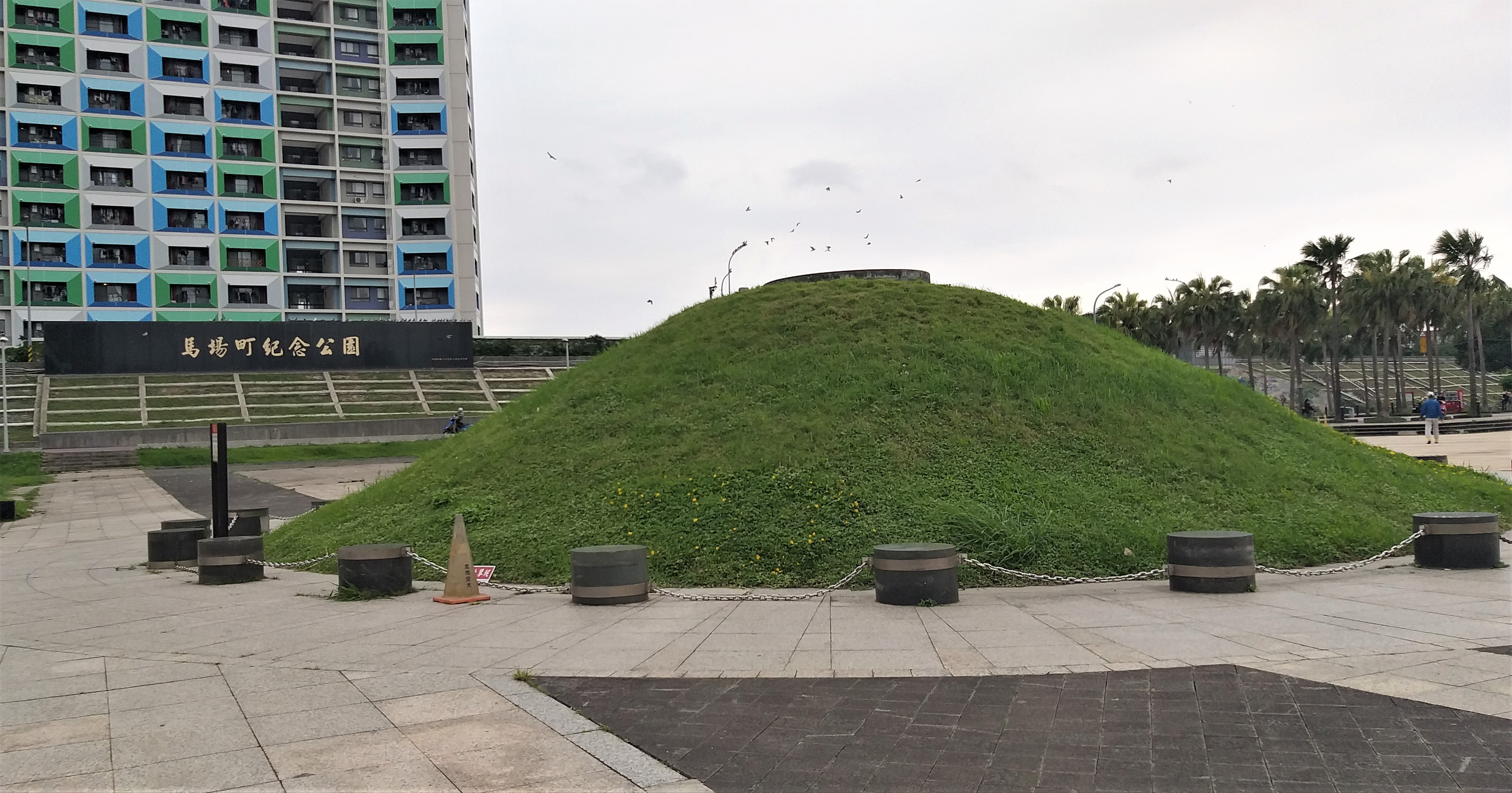
- Machangding Memorial Park
- Interactive map of Machangding Memorial Park
- Type: Park
- Location: Shuiyuan Road and Qingnian Road Intersection, Wanhua District, Taipei, Taiwan
- Coordinates: 25°01′09.2″N 121°30′14.7″E
- Area: 6.8 ha
- Created: 2000
- Open: All day
- Status: Open
- Parking: Taipei First Fruit & Vegetable Market Parking Space (Note: Chinese: 第一果菜批發市場堤外停車場, or 臺北市第一果菜批發市場堤外專屬停車場); Qingnian Social Housing Parking Space (Note: Chinese: 青年一期社會住宅地下停車場); Machangding Memorial Park Parking Space (Note: Chinese: 馬場町紀念公園平面停車場); High Riverbank Park Parking Space (Note: Chinese: 高灘停車場)

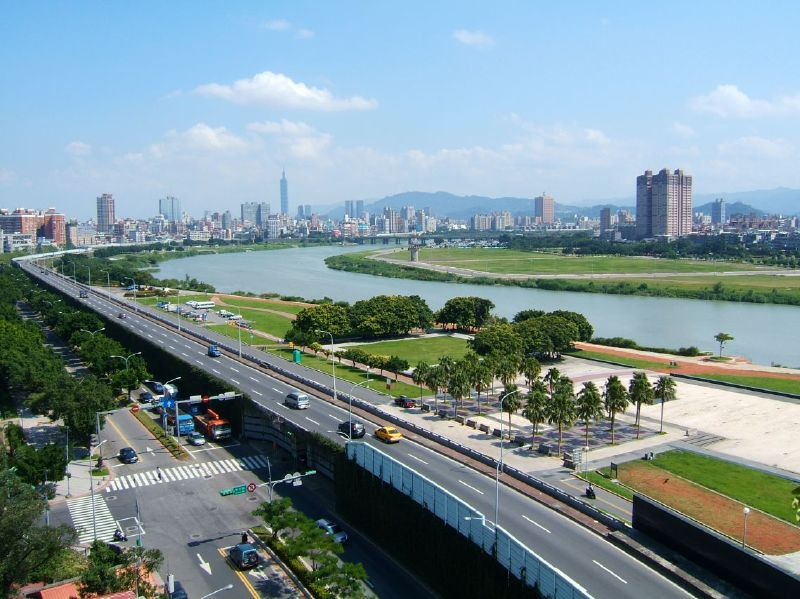
Machangding Memorial Park near Xindian River

Machangding Memorial Park (Chinese: 馬場町紀念公園) located in Wanhua District, Taipei, Taiwan. It neighbours the Youth Park, with ZhongZheng Riverside Park at its east, Huazhong Riverside Park at its west, and neighbours the Xindian River at its south.

Machangding was established during Japanese rule in Taihoku, Formosa, and named Babachō at the time. It originally had training grounds and horse riding activities, hence the name. It was close to Songshan Airport and used for airport training. It is therefore known as Taihoku South Airport before its closure in 1949. Machangding near the region of today's Wanhua District.

The riverside where the park is located was known as an execution ground for executing political prisoners during the white terror period. It later became a horse racing site under the military's supervision, but opened for government officials only. In 1998, then mayor Chen Shui-bian decided to build a park around Machangding and Liuzhangli. It was later finished in 2000 and named "Machangding Memorial Park" by the then mayor Ma Ying-jeou. The park was later designated as a historic site by the Department of Cultural Affairs of Taipei on 6 March, 2020.

== Executed prisoners in Machangding ==
Most prisoners who violated the Betrayers Punishment Act were executed at Machangding, and it is hard to verify the execution numbers. Notable prisoners executed here include Wu Shi, Zhu Shenzi. Huang Mei, Li Yuan's uncle, was executed in Machangding as well.

Some people from China commemorated executed prisoners after a Chinese spy drama Silent Honor aired in 2025. After Cheng Li-wun, then chairperson of the Kuomintang, attended Machangding to commemorate executed prisoners in 2025, some former political prisoners and politicians criticised Kuomintang's rule and their commemorating, citing Wu Shi's rule of a Chinese spy.

== Facilities ==
- Riverside bikeways
- Parking lot: A small ground-level parking lot located on the northeast side of the park.
- A skyway connecting to Youth Park so people can move between the two parks. It is equipped with an elevator, accessible to both pedestrians and bicycles.

== See also ==
- Liuzhangli Mass Grave
- Jing-Mei White Terror Memorial Park
- Ankeng Execution Grounds
