= Beijing West Mountain National Forest Park =

Park in Beijing, China

- 北京西山国家森林公园
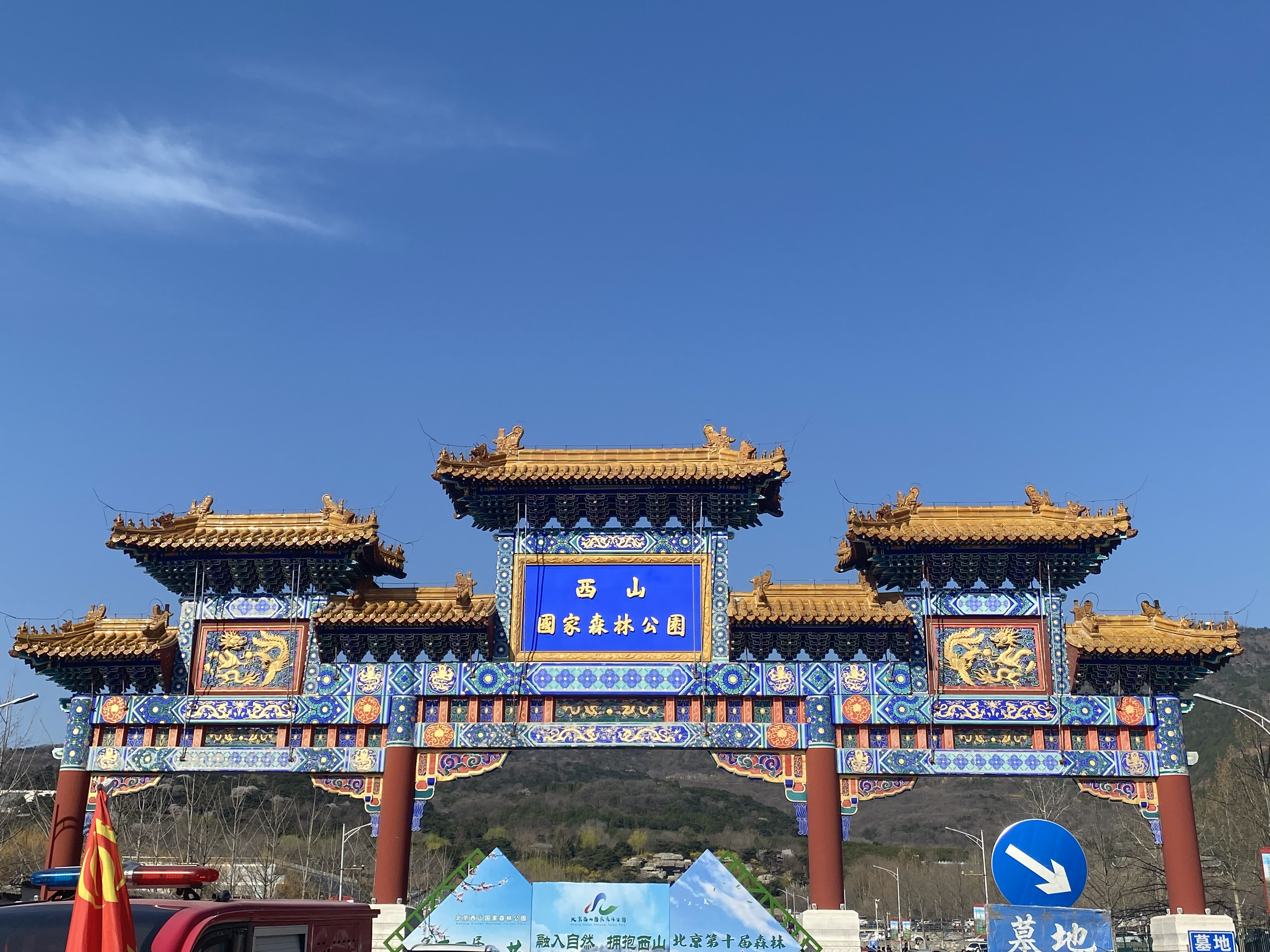
- Entrance

- Location within Beijing
- Interactive map of Beijing West Mountain National Forest Park
- Type: Public park
- Location: Haidian, Shijingshan, and Mentougou Districts of Beijing
- Coordinates: 40°03′40″N 116°05′11″E
- Area: 59.7-square-kilometre (23.1 sq mi)
- Created: 1992; 34 years ago
- Founder: Ministry of Forestry of the People's Republic of China
- Status: Open all year

Chinese name
- Simplified Chinese: 北京西山国家森林公园
- Traditional Chinese: 北京西山國家森林公園
Transcriptions
Standard Mandarin
- Hanyu Pinyin: Běijīng Xīshān Guójiā Sēnlín Gōngyuán

Beijing West Mountain National Forest Park (Chinese: 北京西山国家森林公园) is located in Beijing's western suburbs, spanning across Haidian, Shijingshan, and Mentougou Districts. With a total area of 59.7-square-kilometre (23.1 sq mi), it is recognized as a National Forest Park and a AAA-level tourist attraction.

== History ==
In September 1992, Beijing West Mountain National Forest Park was officially approved and established by the Ministry of Forestry of the People's Republic of China.

== Geography ==
Beijing West Mountain National Forest Park lies in the eastern part of Beijing, an extension of the Taihang Mountains. It is bordered by natural ridges to the west, extends from Badachu Park in the south to Xiangshan Park in the north, and is adjacent to Xiangshan South Road and the Fifth Ring Road in the east, offering convenient transportation. The area features a temperate deciduous broadleaf forest ecosystem and covers a total area of 59.7-square-kilometre (23.1 sq mi).

=== Geology ===
As part of the Taihang Mountains, Beijing West Mountain National Forest Park is characterized by rocky, low mountainous terrain. The northern slopes are relatively steep, while the southern slopes are gentler.

=== Climate ===
Beijing West Mountain National Forest Park experiences a typical warm temperate semi-humid continental monsoon climate, with four distinct seasons. Springs and autumns are short, while winters and summers are longer. Summers are hot and rainy, while winters are cold and dry. The average annual temperature ranges from 10 °C (50 °F) to 13 °C (55 °F). January is the coldest month, with average temperatures between −7 °C (19 °F) and −4 °C (25 °F), while July is the hottest, with average temperatures between 25 °C (77 °F) and 26 °C (79 °F). Extreme temperatures have been recorded as low as −27.4 °C (−17.3 °F) and as high as 42 °C (108 °F) or above.

== Biodiversity ==
=== Flora ===
Beijing West Mountain National Forest Park is home to more than 250 plant species belonging to 73 families. It contains over 4,600 natural Mongolian pines, among which more than 1,000 are ancient trees over 100 years old. The oldest pines have reached 500 years in age, with the largest reaching a diameter of 100 cm.

=== Fauna ===
Beijing West Mountain National Forest Park supports over 10 species of mammals, more than 50 species of birds, and various amphibians and reptiles.

== Attractions ==
=== Unknown Heroes Square ===
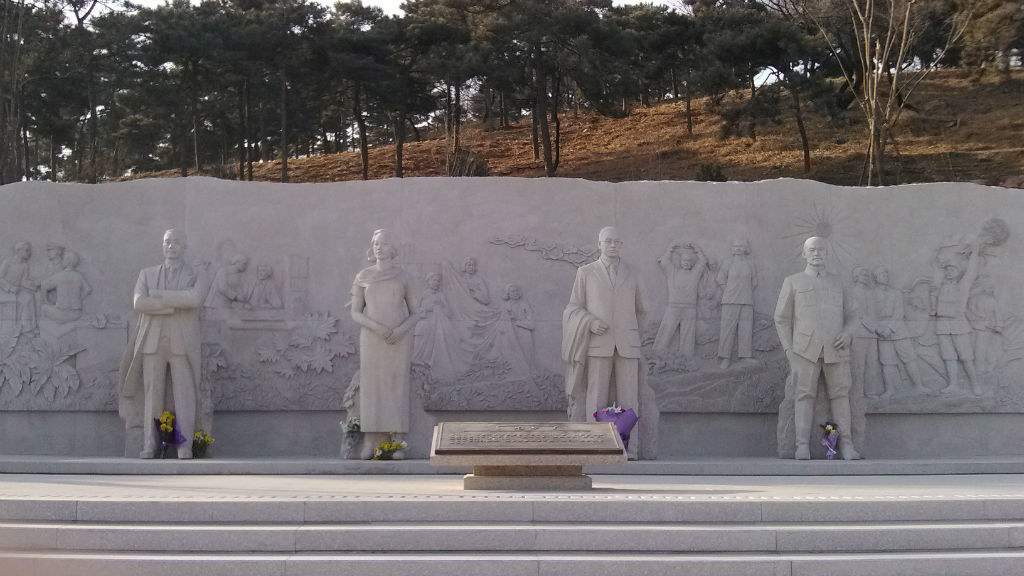
Statues of Chen Baocang, Zhu Feng, Wu Shi, and Nie Xi in the Unknown Heroes Square

In October 2013, the Unknown Heroes Square was established, covering an area of 3,000 square meters, which was built to commemorate the unnamed heroes of the mainland China's covert operations in Taiwan Island during the 1950s. The square was constructed under the supervision of the Liaison Division of the General Political Department of the People's Liberation Army. In front of the Unknown Heroes Monument stand statues of four martyrs: Chen Baocang, Zhu Feng, Wu Shi, and Nie Xi, arranged from south to north. In February 2025, the square was designated as one of the seventh batch of National Martyrs' Memorial Facilities.

=== Cultural Stele Forest ===
Beijing West Mountain National Forest Park features a cultural stele forest containing more than 500 pieces of poetry, calligraphy, paintings, and inscriptions by Chinese Communist revolutionaries, prominent social figures, calligraphers, and individuals from the cultural, artistic, scientific, and educational sectors.

=== Cultural Heritage Sites ===
During the Qing dynasty (1644–1911), the West Mountain area was known as the "Eight Western Hills Gardens" and the "Three Hills and Five Gardens". It served as a garrison for the Eight Banners of the Manchu army, and remnants of this era include villages such as Zhenghuangqi and Zhenglanqi, as well as watchtowers. Notable historical sites in the area include Xiang Mountain (Fragrant Hills), the Temple of the Reclining Buddha, Badachu, Fuhui Temple, Fahai Temple, the Ksitigarbha Hall, the Moon-Inviting Cave, Jingfu Temple, and the Beamless Hall. The park also contains the tombs of notable figures such as Ma Lianliang, Yan Shaopeng, Liu Bannong, Liu Tianhua, Tong Linge, and Mei Lanfang, as well as the Heishanhu Battle Monument.
