= Machangding =

Machangding (Chinese: 馬場町; pinyin: Măchăng dīng; Wade–Giles: Ma^{3}-ch'ang^{3} ting^{1}; lit. 'riding grounds district'), established during Japanese rule in Taipei, Taiwan. It originally had training grounds and horse riding activities, hence the name.

It was west of Kawabata-chō (川端町), near the region of today's Wanhua District, south shore, near the Xindian Creek and Youth Park (青年公園, originally a training ground). Since it is also close to Songshan Airport and was used for airport training, it was also known as "Taihoku South Airport" (臺北南機場; closed in 1949).

During the White Terror (ca. 1947–1987), the waterfront area became an execution ground. People executed in the area include Chen Yi. It is now designated the Machangding Memorial Park. In the past, Taihoku Railroad Corporation Xindian Line had a Babachō Station (馬場町乘降場), but after World War II was renamed to Hoping Station.

== Persons executed here ==
- Chen Baocang
- Chen Yi
- Huang Wengong (黃溫恭)
- Nie Xi
- Song Feiru (宋斐如)
- Wu Shi
- Zhu Feng
