= Nie Xi =

Chinese spy executed in Taiwan (1917–1950)

- 聂曦
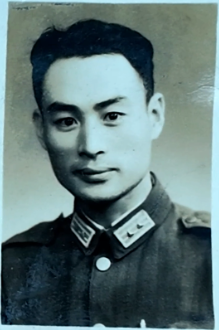
- Nie in 1946
- Born: 1917; Fuzhou, Fujian
- Died: 1950 (aged 32–33); Taipei, Taiwan
- Occupations: Military officer, revolutionary
- Political party: Chinese Communist Party
- Parent: Nie Haoran
- Relatives: Nie Lei (brother)

Chinese name
- Simplified Chinese: 聂曦
- Traditional Chinese: 聶曦
Transcriptions
Standard Mandarin
- Hanyu Pinyin: Niè Xī

Birth name
- Simplified Chinese: 聂能辉
- Traditional Chinese: 聶能輝
Transcriptions
Standard Mandarin
- Hanyu Pinyin: Niè Nénghuī

Nie Xi (Chinese: 聂曦; 1917 – 10 June 1950) was a military officer in the National Government and a spy for the Chinese Communist Party (CCP).

== Early Life and military career ==
Nie was born Nie Nenghui (聂能辉) in 1917 in Fuzhou, Fujian, to Nie Haoran (聂浩然). He had a younger brother Nie Lei (聂磊). He joined the Nationalist military and rose to the rank of colonel. He held several logistical and administrative positions, including section chief of the General Services Division in the Defense Ministry's Historical and Political Bureau and, later, chief of the Liaison Section within the Logistics Department of the Southeast Military and Administrative Command.

== Espionage activities ==
Despite his position in the National Government, Nie was a dedicated communist agent. He served as the aide-de-camp to Lieutenant General Wu Shi, a high-ranking KMT official who was also a secret CCP agent.

In 1949, as KMT forces retreated to Taiwan, a critical task was the disposal of a vast archive of military documents in Fuzhou. Under Wu's orders, Nie played a pivotal role in covertly ensuring that 298 crates of these highly classified military archives were transferred to the People's Liberation Army (PLA) instead of being destroyed or moved to Taiwan.

Demonstrating immense courage, Nie then followed Wu to Taiwan to continue intelligence work. There, he acted as a key liaison between Wu and Zhu Feng (also known as Zhu Fengzhi), a female CCP agent dispatched from Hong Kong. Nie was instrumental in facilitating the handover of crucial intelligence, including Taiwan's defense deployment maps, from Wu to Zhu.

== Death ==
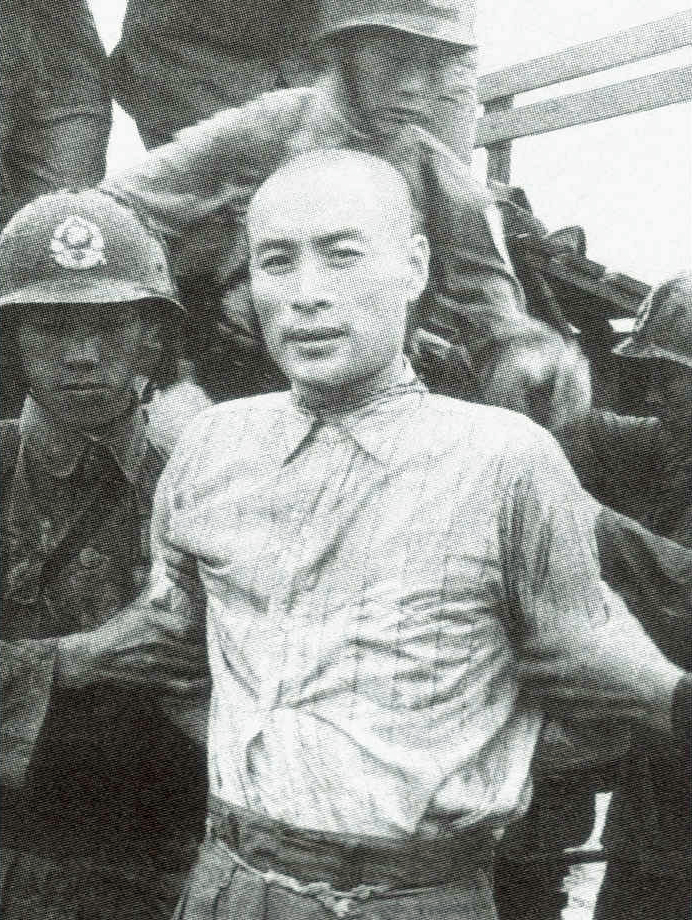
Nie on 10 June 1950

The espionage network was compromised in early 1950 following the arrest and defection of Cai Xiaoqian, a senior Taiwan CCP official. Nie helped warn his comrades and assisted Zhu in her escape attempt, but he was ultimately arrested. During his imprisonment and interrogation, he withstood severe torture without betraying his comrades or the cause.

On 10 June 1950, after a swift and secret military trial, Nie was executed by firing squad at the Machangding execution grounds in Taipei alongside his comrades Wu, Zhu, and Chen Baocang. Contemporary media reports from Taiwan noted his composure before his death, describing him as "heroic in image, steadfast in righteousness, and showing no fear before death."

== Memorials and commemorations ==
In 2006, the government of the People's Republic of China recognized him as a revolutionary martyr.

Nie is memorialized alongside his comrades Wu Shi, Zhu Feng and Chen Baocang on the Monument to the Unknown Heroes at the Beijing West Mountain National Forest Park. The monument's inscription, "Your name is unknown, your deeds are immortal", serves as a fitting tribute to his sacrifice.

His story was also brought to a wider audience through his portrayal by actor Wei Chen in the 2025 television series Silence Honor.
