= Chen Baocang =

Chinese general and spy (1900–1950)

- 陈宝仓
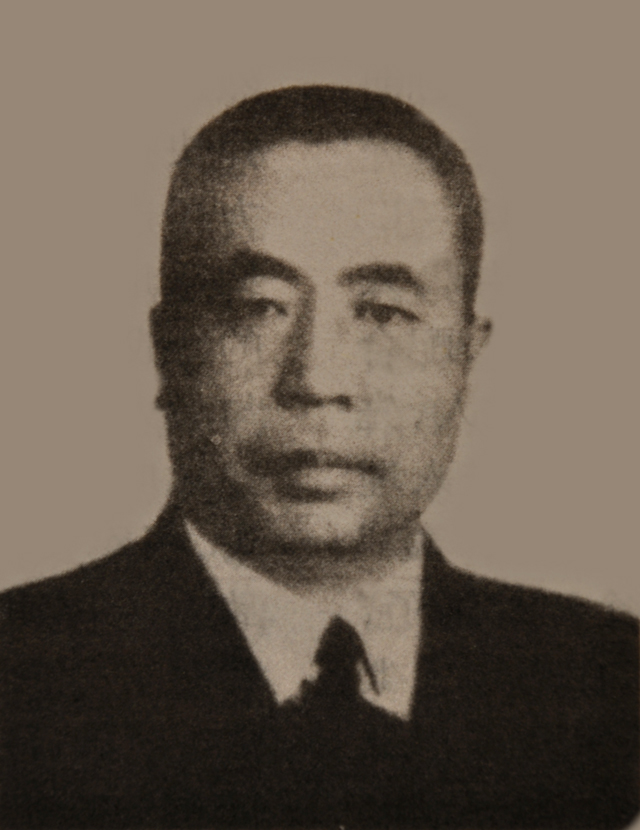
- Chen in 1948
- Born: April 5, 1900; Beijing
- Died: June 10, 1950 (aged 50); Taipei, Taiwan
- Education: Qinghe Military Preparatory School; Baoding Military Academy
- Occupation: Military officer
- Political party: Revolutionary Committee of the Chinese Kuomintang

Chinese name
- Simplified Chinese: 陈宝仓
- Traditional Chinese: 陳寶倉
Transcriptions
Standard Mandarin
- Hanyu Pinyin: Chén Bǎocāng

Courtesy name
- Chinese: 自箴
Transcriptions
Standard Mandarin
- Hanyu Pinyin: Zìzhēn

Chen Baocang (Chinese: 陈宝仓; April 1900 – 10 June 1950) was a Chinese general of the National Revolutionary Army and a spy for the Chinese Communist Party (CCP).

== Early Life and military career ==
Chen was born on 5 April 1900, in Beijing, while his ancestral home was in Zunhua, Hebei. At the age of 14, following the death of his parents and facing financial hardship, he completed secondary school and enrolled in the tuition-free Qinghe Military Preparatory School. Two years later, he transferred with outstanding academic performance to the Ninth Term of the Engineering Department at the Baoding Military Academy.

In the summer of 1923, after graduating from the Baoding Military Academy, Chen went to Taiyuan with his academy friends Guo Zongfen, Duan Xiangjiu, Sun Jingxian, and Shi Jinggong to join Yan Xishan's forces. In Yan Xishan's army, he started as a platoon leader and later served as company commander, battalion commander, regiment commander, division chief of staff, and eventually as a colonel in charge of the education section at the headquarters.

== Second Sino-Japanese War ==
In early 1937, Chen was appointed as the head of the education section at the Wuhan Branch of the Central Military Academy, concurrently serving as director of the Wuhan Defense Command, responsible for the defense of Wuhan. In August of the same year, as the Imperial Japanese Army attacked Shanghai and the military disparity between the enemy and Chinese forces was significant, he was appointed as commander of the Kunshan City Defense and participated in the Battle of Shanghai.

In the spring of 1938, Chen took part in the Battle of Xuancheng in Anhui, where he was severely wounded by a Japanese aerial bombing, resulting in the loss of his right eye. In June of the same year, as the Imperial Japanese Army advanced on Wuhan with naval and air support, he was called to participate in the Battle of Wuhan before his eye injury had fully healed. Recommended by Chen Cheng, commander of the Ninth War Zone, he was appointed chief of staff to Zhang Fakui, commander-in-chief of the Second Army Group, and participated in the Battle of De'an, which resulted in the annihilation of over 20,000 Japanese troops and the death of Japanese Regiment Commander Colonel Tanaka.

At the beginning of the Second Sino-Japanese War, Zhang Fakui visited Guo Moruo in Shanghai and requested the establishment of a political department. Guo consulted with the Shanghai Communist organization and, following Zhou Enlai's instructions, formed a war zone service corps for Zhang, which included over 30 members, many of whom were Communists. Through his service in the Second Army Group, Chen had frequent contact with Communists, leading to a significant shift in his political views.

In the spring of 1939, Zhang Fakui was transferred to serve as commander of the Fourth War Zone, and Chen was appointed deputy chief of staff and acting chief of staff, responsible for military and administrative affairs in Guangdong and Guangxi. The headquarters was initially stationed in Shaoguan and later moved to Liuzhou, Guangxi. Chen was responsible for organizing and commanding the Battle of Lingshan.

In the autumn of 1940, after the Imperial Japanese Army occupied Vietnam, tensions rose along the Sino-Vietnamese border. To ensure the security of the Fourth War Zone's flank and promptly monitor the movements of Japanese troops in Vietnam, Chen was tasked with establishing the Jingxi Command Post of the Fourth War Zone and served as its director, representing Commander Zhang Fakui in handling military, administrative, and important matters related to Vietnam in the Sino-Vietnamese border area. In August 1942, through the mediation of Zhang Fakui and Chen, and with the coordination of the Comintern, Ho Chi Minh was rescued in September 1943.

In August 1945, Chen Cheng recommended Chen Baocang to Chiang Kai-shek as the special commissioner for the acceptance of the Shandong-Jiaozhou region under the Military Administration Department, responsible for accepting the surrender of the Imperial Japanese Army in Qingdao, Shandong.

== Chinese Civil War ==
After 1945, Chen was transferred to serve as director of the Fourth Supply Depot Headquarters. During the Chinese Civil War, Wang Yaowu, governor of Shandong under the Nationalist government, accused Chen of misappropriating supplies and aiding the People's Liberation Army, leading to his dismissal.

In the spring of 1948, Chen joined the underground Revolutionary Committee of the Chinese Kuomintang (RCCK) in British Hong Kong and made contact with Rao Zhangfeng and Fang Fang of the Hong Kong Branch of the Central Committee of the Chinese Communist Party. Chen expressed his willingness and determination to go to Taiwan to contribute to the realization of national reunification. By the end of the year, he was transferred to serve as a lieutenant general senior staff officer in the Ministry of National Defense.

== Espionage activities ==
In 1949, Chen was dispatched by the South China Bureau of the Chinese Communist Party and the Central Committee of the RCCK (some sources indicate he was sent by Li Jishen) to work in Taiwan. After arriving in Taiwan, he actively collaborated with Wu Shi by leveraging his position as a lieutenant general senior staff officer in the Ministry of National Defense to obtain critical intelligence, including the unit designations and diagrams of coastal defense fortifications. He manually compiled and tabulated this information, which he passed to Wu Shi. Wu Shi then organized the materials and dispatched them to Communist Party organizations in British Hong Kong.

== Death ==
In 1950, Cai Xiaoqian was arrested and defected, leading to the devastating destruction of the Communist Party's organization in Taiwan. After Wu Shi was arrested in March, a handwritten piece of military intelligence was discovered during a search of his residence. Handwriting analysis confirmed it was written by Chen Baocang, who was subsequently arrested. On 10 June 1950, he was executed along with Wu Shi, Zhu Feng, and Nie Xi at Machangding in Taipei, aged 50.

== Memorials and commemorations ==
In 1951, the Revolutionary Committee of the Chinese Kuomintang posthumously recognized Chen as a member. Chen's ashes were transported from Taiwan to British Hong Kong via church personnel and then brought to Beijing. In 1952, Mao Zedong signed and issued the "Certificate of Honor for Families of Revolutionary Sacrifice Personnel", granting Chen the title of revolutionary martyr. In 1953, a solemn public memorial ceremony was held, with Li Jishen, vice chairman of the Central People's Government, presiding and reading a lengthy eulogy titled "In Mourning of Comrade Chen Baocang." Chen's ashes were interred at the Babaoshan Revolutionary Cemetery in Beijing.

In October 2013, the Liaison Division of the General Political Department of the People's Liberation Army built the Unknown Heroes Square in Beijing West Mountain National Forest Park, which featured statues of Wu Shi, Zhu Feng, Chen Baocang, and Nie Xi.

His story was also brought to a wider audience through his portrayal by actor Na Zhidong in the 2025 television series Silence Honor.
