= Silent Honor (TV series) =

2025 Chinese television series

- Simplified Chinese: 沉默的荣耀
- Traditional Chinese: 沉默的榮耀
- Hanyu Pinyin: Chénmò Dě Róngyào
- Genre: Spy drama
- Written by: Lu Min; Wang Haotian; Zhang Yu; Liu Jingyun
- Directed by: Yang Yazhou
- Starring: Yu Hewei; Wu Yue; Wei Chen; Zeng Li
- Country of origin: China
- Original language: Mandarin
- No. of seasons: 1
- No. of episodes: 39

Production
- Executive producer: Jia Lei
- Production location: Fujian
- Production companies: iQiyi; Ciwen Film and Television Company; China Central Television

Original release
- Network: CCTV-8
- Release: 30 September 2025 – October 2025

Silent Honor (Chinese: 沉默的荣耀) is a 2025 Chinese spy drama television series. Co-directed by China's Ministry of State Security and Taiwan Affairs Office, the series is based on the life of Wu Shi and stars Yu Hewei, Wu Yue, Wei Chen, and Zeng Li.

== Synopsis ==
In August 1949, during the Chinese Civil War, the People's Liberation Army (PLA) took control of Fuzhou. Wu Shi, a Chinese Communist spy who had infiltrated the Kuomintang (KMT) and served as deputy director of the Fuzhou Pacification Headquarters, had originally planned to remain in Fuzhou to welcome the PLA into the city. Unexpectedly, however, he received an appointment from Chiang Kai-shek promoting him to Deputy Chief of the General Staff at the Ministry of National Defense.

To better assist the Communist underground in gathering intelligence on Taiwan and supporting the effort to take the island, Wu Shi traveled to Taiwan with his family and his aide-de-camp, Nie Xi, to take up his new post. After Wu Shi's original courier was accidentally killed, Communist agent Zhu Feng, who was based in Hong Kong, gave up the opportunity to return to Shanghai to reunite with her family. Instead, she went alone to Taiwan to reestablish contact with Wu Shi. Working closely together, they transmitted numerous pieces of crucial intelligence while evading the efforts of Gu Zhengwen and others.

As the Nationalist forces suffered successive defeats in mainland China, the era of White Terror in Taiwan intensified. After being betrayed by the defector Cai Xiaoqian, Wu Shi and his associates were all arrested and were ultimately executed in Taiwan.

== Cast ==
=== Main ===
- Yu Hewei as Wu Shi
- Wu Yue as Zhu Feng
- Wei Chen as Nie Xi
- Zeng Li as Wang Bikui, Wu Shi's wife

=== Supporting ===
- Yu Entai as Cai Xiaoqian
- Na Zhidong as Chen Baocang
- Tan Kai as Chen Zemin
- Yu Ailei as Gu Zhengwen
- Zhang Xilin as Mao Renfeng
- Fu Hongming as Zhou Zhirou
- Zheng Xiaoning as Zhu Shaoliang
- Ma Xiaowei as Chiang Kai-shek
- Huo Qing as Gu Zhutong
- Huang Junpeng as Chen Cheng

== Soundtrack ==
No.	Title	Lyrics	Music	Singer(s)	Length
1.	"Mountains and Rivers are as You Expected (山河如你所期)" (Opening theme)	An Jiu	Kang Zhuqing	Bei Bei
2.	"Sneak (潜行)" (Interlude Ending theme)	Muzi	Kang Zhuqing	International Chief Philharmonic Chorus
3.	"Reunion (团圆)" (Interlude)	Yu Hewei	Kang Zhuqing	Qiaomai
4.	"Farewell (送别)" (Interlude)	Hong Yi	John Pond Ordway	Lyu Chenyue

== Release ==
The series premiered on 30 September 2025 on CCTV-8 and major streaming platforms including iQiyi and Migu Video.

== Reception ==
=== Critical response ===
Analysts interviewed by Radio Taiwan International said the series marked a new phase in China's united-front television and film propaganda as "it uses entertainment to publicly glorify its undercover agents amid strained cross-strait relations."

Alcott Weiss' of South China Morning Post wrote that the series "marks rare salute to Communist Party spies in Taiwan".

=== Viewership ===
Silent Honor premiere set a new record for CCTV-8's prime time slot, with real-time ratings breaking 3% and peaking at 3.07%. It has generated massive discussion online, with related topics reaching 800 million views on social platforms.
