= Taiwan Provincial Working Committee of the Chinese Communist Party =

Chinese Communist Party organization

Taiwan Provincial Working Committee of the Chinese Communist Party 中國共產黨台灣省工作委員會

Overview
- Type: Organization under the East China Bureau of the CCP Central Committee
- Secretary: Cai Xiaoqian (1946–1950); Chen Fuxing (1950–1952)
- Deputy Secretary: Zhang Zhizhong
- Standing Committee: Cai Xiaogan, Zhang Zhizhong, Jin Yaoru

The Taiwan Provincial Working Committee of the Chinese Communist Party was a provincial organization of the Chinese Communist Party (CCP) in Taiwan from 1946 to 1952. Since the Taiwanese Communist Party operated during the Japanese colonial rule, some members of the Provincial Working Committee were former members of the Taiwanese Communist Party, but the Provincial Working Committee had no successor relationship with the party. In 1952, the Provincial Working Committee was dismantled by the Kuomintang in Sanyi, Miaoli, and its leadership was incarcerated or executed during the White Terror.

== History ==
The reason for the establishment of the Taiwan Provincial Working Committee of the Chinese Communist Party was that in September 1945, the Chinese Communist Party (CCP) ordered Cai Xiaogan (a former member of the Taiwanese Communist Party and a native of Changhua County) to return to Taiwan to establish an organization. In August 1946, Cai returned to Taiwan and met with former members of the Taiwanese Communist Party at Lin Liangcai's home in Taipei. During the meeting, Cai said that the CCP had instructed him to establish a party organization in Taiwan. Taiwan Provincial Working Committee of the Chinese Communist Party was subsequently established. After the establishment of the Provincial Working Committee, working committees and branches were successively established in Hsinchu, Tainan, Chiayi, Kaohsiung and other places.

=== Activities ===
When the February 28 incident occurred in 1947, the Taiwan Provincial Committee of the Chinese Communist Party was still in its initial stage of establishment, with more than 70 CCP members belonging to the Taiwan Provincial Committee and its branches in various places. At the time of the February 28 incident, during the Chianan Uprising, many people formed the Taiwan Self-Government Allied Army to resist the Chen Yi government. Among them, Zhang Zhizhong and Li Madou were members of the Taiwan Provincial Committee of the Chinese Communist Party.

According to a report in the Study Times, the official newspaper of the Central Party School, on August 5, 2010, in mid-1949, the Provincial Committee reported to the CCP Central Committee that it had 1,300 underground Party members and submitted a Proposal for Attacking Taiwan, suggesting that the People's Liberation Army attack Taiwan in April 1950. The Taiwan Provincial Committee published the Guangming Daily in Taipei. After 1946, Cai Xiaogan established the Taipei Municipal Committee of the Chinese Communist Party in Taipei through Liao Ruifa, an old member of the Taiwanese Communist Party. He absorbed Guo Xiuzong and expanded the organization to National Taiwan University, National Taiwan University College of Medicine and Yilan area. The Student Work Committee was mainly led by Li Xumaode from the mainland. Work committees were established in schools in the north, central and southern regions to be responsible for the united front work and student movement, such as supporting the May 20th Movement, anti-hunger and anti-civil war, which led to the April 6th Incident. Later, Li Shuijing led the organization. The northern region was originally led by Zhang Zhizhong. Keelung was led by Zhong Haodong to develop the organization.

Later, Zhang Zhizhong returned to the Chiayi area. Taoyuan and Haishan areas were led by Chen Fuxing. Hong Youqiao was responsible for the central region. The Taichung Municipal Committee of the Chinese Communist Party was established. There was also an armed work committee to carry out activities such as kidnapping, extortion, assassination and robbery. Li Hantang, Shi Busheng and Lü Huanzhang were the main leaders. In the southern region, Tainan was managed by Li Madou, Kaohsiung by Liu Teshen, and after the Hong Kong meeting, Chen Zemin became the main person in charge of the southern region and continued to develop the organization. The main organization was the Niu Li Hui, which incited resistance against landlords when the government implemented the 37.5% rent reduction.

=== Dissolution ===
On 1 October 1949, the People's Republic of China was formally established. The People's Liberation Army (PLA) immediately intensified its advance into major provinces and cities and actively planned an offensive against the remaining Nationalist forces. However, with the outbreak of the Korean War in 1950 and the entry of the US Navy into the Taiwan Strait, the PLA was forced to abandon its plan to cross the strait and attack Taiwan. The activities of the CCP in Taiwan declined afterwards as the PLA was unable to launch an attack. In August 1949, the CCP Taiwan Provincial Committee's publication, the Guangming Daily, was raided by the Republic of China government. In October, branches of the Provincial Committee at Cheng Kung Senior High School, the Law School of National Taiwan University, and Keelung High School were also raided, and several leaders were arrested. On October 31, the Provincial Committee's Kaohsiung City Committee was also raided, and its secretary, Chen Zemin (alias Lao Qian), and committee member Zhu Zihui were arrested, dealing a significant blow to the organization. The subsequent Keelung High School incident, the railway organization case, the Zhunan District Committee case, the Yangmei branch case, the Songshan Sixth Machinery Factory case, the Zhudong Cement Factory case, the Miaoli Oil Factory case, the Jiadong branch case, and the Madou branch case all dealt a blow to the CCP's organizational activities in this area. In March 1950, Cai Xiaogan, secretary of the Provincial Working Committee, was arrested and defected to the Kuomintang. He served as a member of the Design Committee of the Bureau of Investigation and Statistics of the Ministry of National Defense of the Republic of China (later promoted to major general). He also revealed the CCP's personnel in Taiwan, resulting in the implication of more than a thousand people. The Working Committee's mountain guerrilla armed forces operated in the Sanyi, Dahu, and Sanwan areas in the early 1950s. Their Zhuzikeng stronghold was destroyed in the spring of 1950.

In May 1950, Deputy Secretary Zhang Zhizhong was arrested. Chiang Ching-kuo visited Zhang in prison multiple times, attempting to persuade him to surrender, but Zhang refused. Zhang was executed by firing squad in March 1954. In May 1950, Chen Fuxing and others reorganized the organization, and by the spring of 1951, the leadership structure was re-established. However, in April 1952, Chen Fuxing, Zeng Yongxian, and other leaders were arrested. With the Kuomintang government continuously strengthening its control over Taiwan and its strong crackdown on communist forces, the Provincial Committee no longer had the strength for organized armed resistance in Taiwan.

== Organization ==
In 1947, the CCP Taiwan Provincial Committee had only about seventy members, not yet a significant force in Taiwan. By the end of 1949, the number of members was less than a thousand (according to Cai Xiaogan's confession). In March 1950, after Cai Xiaogan, the secretary of the Provincial Committee, was arrested, he revealed the CCP's members in Taiwan to the Kuomintang, resulting in the arrest and imprisonment of more than 1,800 people. Including those who escaped, such as Jin Yaoru, it is estimated that there were at least 2,000 CCP members in Taiwan in 1950. Key members of the Provincial Committee included Cai Xiaogan, Zhang Zhizhong (joined in 1946), Chen Fuxing ( joined in 1946), Jin Yaoru (joined in 1947), Liao Ruifa (joined in 1947), Zhang Mingxian (joined in 1947), and Jian Ji (joined in 1948). Cai Xiaogan served as the provincial committee secretary, with Zhang Zhizhong as the deputy secretary and head of the armed work department, and Jin Yaoru as a member of the provincial standing committee and head of propaganda. The CCP Taiwan Provincial Committee established provincial and regional organizations in Taiwan. Provincial-level organizations include the Postal and Telecommunications Branch Committee of the Taiwan Provincial Working Committee of the CCP, the Railway Branch Committee of the Taiwan Provincial Working Committee of the CCP, and the Student Affairs Committee (referred to as the CCP Taiwan Provincial Student Committee). Regional organizations include the CCP Keelung Municipal Committee, the CCP Taipei Municipal Committee, the CCP Taichung Municipal Committee, the CCP Tainan Municipal Committee, and the CCP Kaohsiung Municipal Committee, among others.
