= Zhu Feng =

Communist Chinese intelligence agent

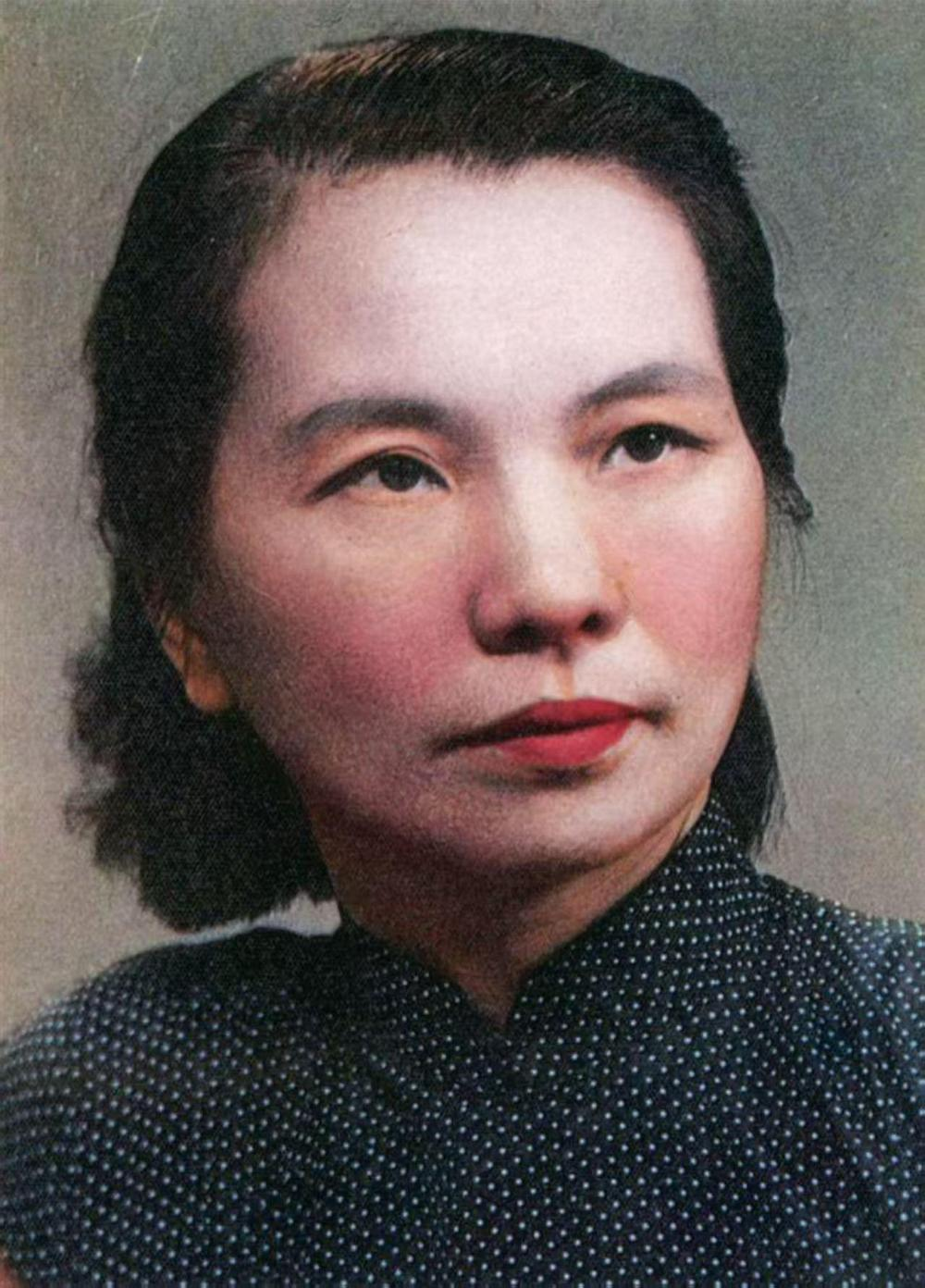
- Zhu Feng in 1949
- Born: 22 November 1905; Ningbo, Zhejiang, Qing
- Died: 10 June 1950 (aged 44); Taipei, Taiwan
- Resting place: Babaoshan Revolutionary Cemetery
- Other names: Zhu Chenzhi
- Occupation: intelligence agent

Chinese name
- Traditional Chinese: 朱楓
- Simplified Chinese: 朱枫
Transcriptions
Standard Mandarin
- Hanyu Pinyin: Zhū Fēng

Courtesy name
- Traditional Chinese: 彌明
- Simplified Chinese: 弥明
Transcriptions
Standard Mandarin
- Hanyu Pinyin: Mí Míng

Birth name
- Traditional Chinese: 朱諶之
- Simplified Chinese: 朱谌之
Transcriptions
Standard Mandarin
- Hanyu Pinyin: Zhū Chénzhī

Nickname
- Traditional Chinese: 朱桂鳳
- Simplified Chinese: 朱桂凤
Transcriptions
Standard Mandarin
- Hanyu Pinyin: Zhū Guìfèng

Zhu Feng (Chinese: 朱楓; pinyin: Zhū Fēng; Wade–Giles: Chu Feng; 1905–1950) was a Communist Chinese intelligence agent who worked undercover in Taiwan during 1949 gathering information on the Government of the Republic of China (ROC). She completed several missions, successfully transmitting data on military layouts before being arrested in 1950 and subsequently executed. In 2011, after 60 years her ashes were returned to her family in Nanjing and later buried at Babaoshan Revolutionary Cemetery.

== Life ==
Zhu was born in 1905 in Ningbo, Zhejiang Province, into a wealthy family that ran a local fishery trade association. She studied at Ningbo Normal School for Women (now part of Ningbo University) where she was introduced to revolutionary ideology. After college, she married engineer Chen Shouqing and the couple moved back to Ningbo following the Mukden Incident. A few years later Chen died of cholera and Zhu remarried, working alongside her new husband Zhu Xiaoguang, whom she had a son with. She operated a bookstore distributing anti-Japanese propaganda. In 1945 she joined the Chinese Communist Party and three years later was sent to Hong Kong as a spy at the Hong Kong Hezhong Trading Corporation.

After working in Hong Kong, she was dispatched to Taiwan in 1949 to gather military intelligence on the Kuomintang who had recently fled from mainland China to re-establish their government on the island. She met with two undercover agents: Cai Xiaoqian, secretary of Taiwan CPC Working Committee and Wu Shi, a CPC intelligence worker serving at a high-ranking post in the ROC government. They reported having organised armed forces to aid the People's Liberation Army in taking Taiwan and passed her microfilm with military plans.

After having the microfilm successfully smuggled off the island via Keelung Port, Cai Xiaoqian was exposed as a spy and broke under interrogation revealing Zhu's identity and the CPC's plan to invade Taiwan. After a suicide attempt, Zhu was arrested in February 1950, tried and executed by firing squad on 10 June 1950 in Taipei. The CPC declared her a martyr of the revolution.

== Return of remains ==
In 2001 the Shandong Pictorial Publishing House printed two photos of Zhu Feng, one at her trial clutching a railing and one shortly before her execution. The photos were seen by her family in Nanjing and prompted them to request her ashes be returned to them from the ROC government. After a decade of searching, scholars managed to locate Zhu Feng's remains at the Fude Cemetery of Taipei and on 9 December 2011 they were returned to Mainland China to be buried at the Babaoshan Revolutionary Cemetery.

== Memorials and commemorations ==
In October 2013, the Liaison Division of the General Political Department of the People's Liberation Army built the Unknown Heroes Square in Beijing West Mountain National Forest Park, which featured statues of Wu Shi, Zhu Feng, Chen Baocang, and Nie Xi.

Her story was also brought to a wider audience through her portrayal by actress Wu Yue in the 2025 television series Silence Honor.
