= Ministry of Forestry (China) =

Chinese government department

Ministry of Forestry of the People's Republic of China
- 中华人民共和国林业部; Zhōnghuá Rénmín Gònghéguó Línyè Bù

Agency overview
- Formed: October 1949
- Dissolved: March 10, 1998
- Superseding agency: National Forestry and Grassland Administration
- Type: Constituent Department of the State Council (cabinet-level executive department)
- Jurisdiction: Government of China
- Headquarters: Beijing
- Parent agency: State Council

Ministry of Forestry
- Traditional Chinese: 中華人民共和國林業部
- Simplified Chinese: 中华人民共和国林业部
Transcriptions
Standard Mandarin
- Hanyu Pinyin: Zhōnghuá Rénmín Gònghéguó Línyè Bù

Ministry of Forestry of the People's Republic of China was a constituent department of the State Council of the People's Republic of China, responsible for forestry work.

== History ==
The Central People's Government Ministry of Forestry and Reclamation (中央人民政府林垦部) was established in October 1949. On November 5, 1951, it was reorganized as the Central People's Government Ministry of Forestry (中央人民政府林业部), with its land reclamation responsibilities transferred to the Ministry of Agriculture.

In September 1954, the ministry was restructured into the Ministry of Forestry of the People's Republic of China (中华人民共和国林业部), becoming a constituent department of the State Council while maintaining its oversight of national forestry development and timber production. The formal transition was completed on November 30, 1954. By 1955, the ministry had expanded to include nine departmental units and seven directly subordinate organizations.

On May 12, 1956, the 40th Session of the Standing Committee of the 1st National People's Congress decided to establish the Ministry of Forest Industry of the People's Republic of China (中华人民共和国森林工业部). The Ministry of Forestry consequently transferred some of its functions to the new ministry, retaining seven internal departments and four subordinate units. Subsequently, on February 11, 1958, the 5th Session of the 1st National People's Congress approved the merger of the Ministry of Forestry and the Ministry of Forest Industry, reuniting them as the Ministry of Forestry of the People's Republic of China (中华人民共和国林业部). In February 1966, the Ministry's Party Leadership Group was reconstituted as a Party Committee.

By 1966, the Ministry's organizational structure encompassed numerous departments including the General Office, Planning Department, Finance Bureau, Timber Production Department, Forest Products Industry Department, Afforestation Department, Forest Protection Department, Technology Department, Labor and Wages Department, Education Department, Foreign Liaison Department, Survey and Planning Bureau, Capital Construction Bureau, State-Owned Forest Farm Administration, Equipment and Materials Management Bureau, Propaganda Division, Political Department, and an Inspection Group dispatched by the Central Commission for Discipline Inspection. The ministry also supervised sixty directly subordinate units.

After August 1966, leaders of the Ministry of Forestry were successively criticized, and major leaders such as Luo Yuchuan and Hui Zhongquan were isolated and reviewed. On October 6, 1967, the Central Committee of the Chinese Communist Party (CCP Central Committee), the State Council, the Central Military Commission, and the Central Cultural Revolution Group issued the "Decision on Implementing Military Control over the Ministry of Forestry (Trial Draft)". Simultaneously the government appoint Wang Yun as director of the Military Control Commission and Li Guangxun as deputy director.

In a major restructuring of agricultural and forestry administration, the State Council Agriculture and Forestry Office (国务院农林办公室), the CPC Central Committee Agriculture and Forestry Political Department (中共中央农林政治部), the Ministry of Agriculture, the Ministry of Forestry, the Ministry of State Farms and Land Reclamation (农垦部), and the Ministry of Aquatic Products (水产部) were consolidated into a single Ministry of Agriculture and Forestry (农林部). This consolidation was formally initiated on May 1, 1970, and confirmed by a CCP Central Committee decision on June 7, 1970. The new ministry became operational in July 1970, leading to the dissolution of the former Ministry of Forestry. A specialized forestry authority reemerged on April 24, 1978, with the establishment of the State Forestry Administration (国家林业总局).

The Ministry of Forestry was reinstated on February 16, 1979, following a decision by the CPC Central Committee and the State Council to dissolve the Ministry of Agriculture and Forestry. This move was formally ratified on February 23, 1979, by the 6th Session of the 1th National People's Congress Standing Committee, which simultaneously reestablished the Ministry of Agriculture. The revitalized Ministry of Forestry initially operated with 18 departmental units and 40 directly subordinate institutions. Parallel to this central restructuring, forestry and agricultural bureaus were progressively restored or newly created at provincial levels, forming a comprehensive national forestry administration system.

During the 1982 State Council reorganization, the Ministry of Forestry was retained with a defined mandate to "implement the Party and state's forestry policies and regulations, mobilize nationwide afforestation efforts, protect and rationally utilize forest resources, and provide professional guidance to regional forestry work." By June 1982, its structure included divisions such as the General Office, Planning, Finance, Afforestation Management, Forest Resources, Forest Protection, Forest Policy, Science & Technology, Education, Personnel, Foreign Affairs, Publicity, Forestry Industry, Administrative Services, and Retired Cadres Management, overseeing 51 subordinate units. The 1984 reorganization introduced the Policy Research Office and Forestry Police while consolidating the Forest Policy and Forest Protection departments into a Forest Policy and Protection Department.

The State Commission Office for Public Sector Reform (国家机构编制委员会) approved the Ministry's "Three Determinations" plan in October 1988, confirming its role as the State Council's primary forestry administrative body. Key reforms focused on three transformational areas, resulting in 15 functional departments including Policy and Legislation, Resource and Forest Policy Management, Afforestation Management, Forest Industry, Wildlife and Forest Plant Conservation, Forestry Police, Forest Fire Prevention Office (incorporating National Forest Fire Headquarters and Armed Forest Police functions), Comprehensive Planning, Finance, Science & Technology, Education and Publicity, Foreign Affairs, Personnel and Labor, Administrative Services, plus an internal Party Committee. Additional units included Retired Cadres Management, and resident supervision and audit bureaus.

The Ministry retained its status in the 1993 State Council reform as the central forestry administrative authority, responsible for ecological construction and industry management while exercising forestry administrative enforcement powers. The restructured ministry operated through 13 functional departments and an internal party committee, supplemented by three auxiliary bureaus. Ultimately, the 9th National People's Congress approved the State Council restructuring plan on March 10, 1998, replacing the Ministry of Forestry with the State Forestry Administration (国家林业局) as a subordinate State Council agency.

In March 2018, the National Forestry and Grassland Administration (国家林业和草原局) was created under the Ministry of Natural Resources, concluding the existence of the State Forestry Administration.

== Leaders ==
=== Ministers ===
- Liang Xi (September 1954 – December 1958)
- Liu Wenhui (April 28, 1959 – 1966)
- Wang Yun (October 6, 1967 – ?, Director of the Military Control Commission)
- Luo Yuchuan (February 16, 1979 – August 30, 1980)
- Yong Wentao (August 30, 1980 – April 1982)
- Yang Zhong (April 9, 1982 – June 23, 1987, dismissed)
- Gao Dezhan (June 23, 1987 – March 1993)
- Xu Youfang (March 29, 1993 – August 1997)
- Chen Yaobang (August 29, 1997 – March 1998)

=== Vice Ministers ===
- Li Fanwu (September 1954 – January 1958)
- Luo Yuchuan (September 1954 – August 1956; August 25, 1959 – 1966)
- Yong Wentao (September 1954 – August 1956; August 25, 1959 – December 1960; February 16, 1979 – August 1980)
- Hui Zhongquan (September 1954 – 1966)
- Liu Chengdong (January 31, 1955 – August 1956)
- Li Xiangfu (1955 – 1961)
- Zhang Kexia (June 4, 1956 – 1966)
- Zhang Qingfu (August 18, 1956 – September 1958)
- Zhou Junming (August 25, 1959 – 1961)
- Chen Li (August 25, 1959 – 1966)
- Tang Ziqi (August 25, 1959 – 1966; May 3, 1979 – April 1982)
- Zhang Zhao (April 29, 1960 – 1966)
- Liang Changwu (July 9, 1961 – 1966; May 3, 1979 – April 1982)
- Yang Tianfang (February 23, 1963 – 1966; May 3, 1979 – April 1982)
- Xun Changwu (October 23, 1963 – 1966; May 3, 1979 – April 1982)
- Zhang Shijun (April 17, 1965 – 1966; May 3, 1979 – April 1982)
- Li Guangxun (October 6, 1967 – ?, deputy director of the Military Control Commission)
- Yang Jue (May 3, 1979 – April 1982)
- Ma Yuhuai (May 3, 1979 – April 1982)
- Hao Yushan (May 3, 1979 – April 1982)
- Yang Yansen (May 3, 1979 – April 1982)
- Wang Bin (May 3, 1979 – April 1982)
- Liu Kun (May 3, 1979 – March 1986)
- Zhang Panshi (June 8, 1979 – April 1982)
- Wang Dianwen (April 9, 1982 – March 1986)
- Dong Zhiyong (April 9, 1982 – June 23, 1987, dismissed)
- Liu Guangyun (October 5, 1983 – September 1992)
- Xu Youfang (March 1986 – March 1993)
- Shen Maocheng (May 1988 – April 1995)
- Cai Yansong (February 5, 1989 – September 1992)
- Wang Zhibao (September 15, 1992 – March 1998)
- Zhu Guangyao (June 30, 1993 – March 1998)
- Liu Yuhe (April 12, 1994 – March 1998)
- Li Yucai (April 17, 1995 – March 1998)

=== Party Group Secretaries ===
- Li Fanwu (1954 – January 1955; September 1956 – January 1958)
- Luo Yuchuan (January 1955 – May 1956, Party Group Secretary; July 1958 – February 1966, Party Group Secretary; February 1966 – 1966, Party Committee Secretary; February 1979 – August 1980, Party Group Secretary)
- Yong Wentao (August 1980 – April 1982)
- Yang Zhong (April 1982 – June 1987, dismissed)
- Gao Dezhan (June 1987 – October 1988; December 1989 – March 18, 1993)
- Xu Youfang (March 18, 1993 – July 4, 1997)
- Chen Yaobang (July 4, 1997 – March 1998)

=== Deputy Party Group Secretaries ===
- Li Fanwu (January 1955 – September 1956)
- Hui Zhongquan (July 1958 – February 1966, Deputy Party Group Secretary; February 1966 – 1966, Deputy Party Committee Secretary)
- Yong Wentao (February 1979 – August 1980)
- Yang Jue (February 1979 – April 1982)
- Ma Yuhuai (December 1980 – April 1982)
- Liu Kun (April 1982 – March 1986)
- Shen Maocheng (June 1993 – March 1995)

=== Party Group Members ===
- Yong Wentao (September 1954 – August 1956; August 1959 – December 1960)
- Hui Zhongquan (September 1954 – July 1958)
- Liu Chengdong (January 1955 – August 1956)
- Li Xiangfu (1955 – 1961)
- Zhang Kexia (June 1956 – 1966)
- Zhang Qingfu (August 1956 – September 1958)
- Zhou Junming (August 1959 – 1961)
- Chen Li (August 1959 – 1966)
- Tang Ziqi (August 1959 – 1966; May 1979 – April 1982)
- Zhang Zhao (April 1960 – 1966)
- Liang Changwu (July 1961 – 1966; May 1979 – April 1982)
- Yang Tianfang (February 1963 – 1966; May 1979 – April 1982)
- Xun Changwu (October 1963 – 1966; May 1979 – April 1982)
- Zhang Shijun (April 1965 – 1966; May 1979 – April 1982)
- Ma Yuhuai (May 1979 – December 1980)
- Hao Yushan (May 1979 – April 1982)
- Yang Yansen (May 1979 – April 1982)
- Wang Bin (May 1979 – April 1982)
- Liu Kun (May 1979 – April 1982)
- Zhang Panshi (June 1979 – April 1982)
- Wang Dianwen (April 1982 – March 1986)
- Dong Zhiyong (April 1982 – June 1987, dismissed)
- Liu Guangyun (October 1983 – September 1992)
- Xu Youfang (March 1986 – March 1993)
- Shen Maocheng (May 1988 – June 1993)
- Cai Yansong (February 1989 – September 1992)
- Wang Zhibao (September 1992 – March 1998)
- Zhu Guangyao (June 1993 – March 1998)
- Li Yucai (December 1993 – March 1998)
- Liu Yuhe (April 1994 – March 1998)
- Li Changjian (November 5, 1994 – March 1998, Leader of the Discipline Inspection Team stationed in the Ministry)
- Jiang Zehui (January 9, 1996 – March 1998, President of the Chinese Academy of Forestry)
- Kuang Guobin (? – March 1998)

=== Advisors ===
- Luo Yuchuan (August 30, 1980 – ?)
- Yong Wentao (April 9, 1982 – ?, concurrently serving as deputy director of the Central Greening Committee)
- Ma Yuhuai (April 9, 1982 – ?)
- Zhang Shijun (April 9, 1982 – ?)
