= Feng Chu =

Chinese-French operations researcher

Feng Chu (Chinese: 储凤; pinyin: Chǔ Fèng; born 1965) is a Chinese-French computer scientist and operations researcher whose research applies Petri nets to combinatorial optimization problems arising in inventory control, manufacturing, and transportation. She is a distinguished professor at the University of Évry Val d'Essonne, where she is director of the AROBAS (Algorithmics, Operations Research, Bioinformatics and Statistical Learning) team within the IBISC (Computer Science, Bio-Informatics and Complex Systems) laboratory, and head of the Chinese mission in the office of the president of the university.

== Education ==
Chu graduated with a bachelor's degree in electrical engineering from Hefei University of Technology in China in 1986. After coming to France for graduate study, she earned a diplôme d'études approfondies (master's degree) in 1991 in metrology, automatic control and electrical engineering from the National Polytechnic Institute of Lorraine, and a doctorate in 1995 in automatic control, computer science, and production management from Paul Verlaine University – Metz; both institutions are now part of the University of Lorraine.

== Career ==
She was a researcher for the French Institute for Research in Computer Science and Automation (INRIA) from 1992 to 1995, became a researcher and then maître de conférences at the University of Technology of Troyes from 2009, while earning a habilitation in 2006 through the University of Technology of Compiègne. She joined the University of Évry Val d'Essonne in 2009, and was named a distinguished professor (professeur de classe exceptionnelle des universités) in 2017. She also held a chair professorship at Hefei University of Technology from 2013 to 2018.
