= Wu Shi =

Chinese Communist Party spy in Taiwan

- 吴石
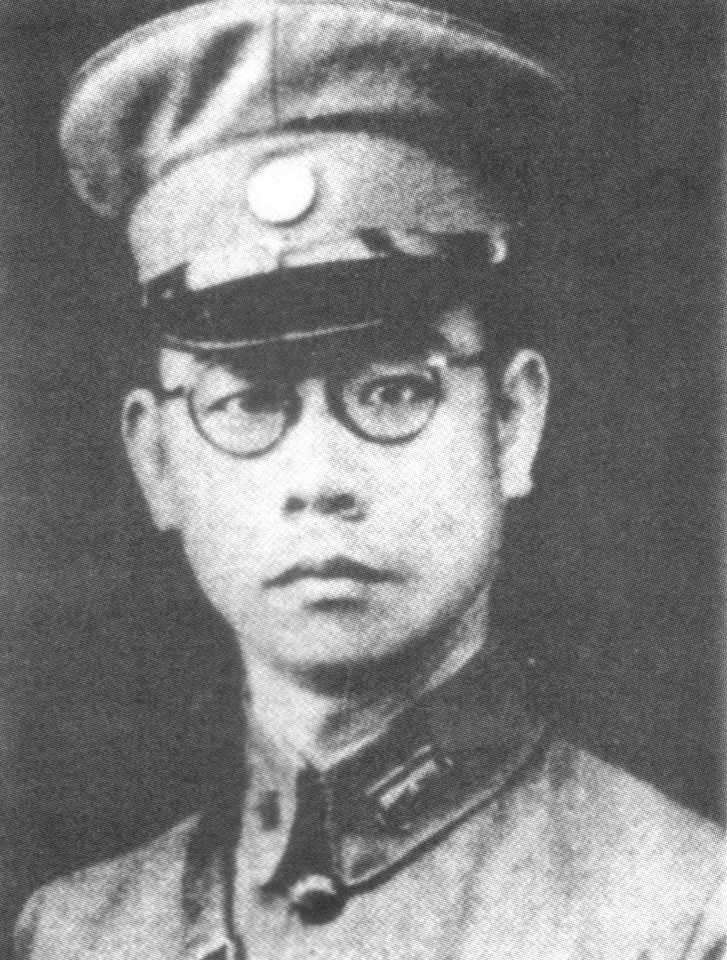
- Wu in 1936
- Born: Wu Cuiwen; 14 September 1894; Luozhou Township, Minhou County, Fujian
- Died: 10 June 1950 (aged 55); Machangding, Taipei, Taiwan
- Education: Baoding Military Academy; Imperial Japanese Army Academy
- Occupation: Military officer
- Political party: Revolutionary Committee of the Chinese Kuomintang
- Spouse: Wang Bikui (m. 1923; died 1993)
- Children: 6
- Parent: Wu Guowan

Chinese name
- Simplified Chinese: 吴石
- Traditional Chinese: 吳石
Transcriptions
Standard Mandarin
- Hanyu Pinyin: Wú Shí

Courtesy name
- Chinese: 虞薰
Transcriptions
Standard Mandarin
- Hanyu Pinyin: Yúxūn

Art name
- Chinese: 湛然
Transcriptions
Standard Mandarin
- Hanyu Pinyin: Zhànrán

Birth name
- Simplified Chinese: 吴萃文
- Traditional Chinese: 吳萃文
Transcriptions
Standard Mandarin
- Hanyu Pinyin: Wú Cuìwén

Wu Shi (Chinese: 吴石; 14 September 1894 – 10 June 1950) was a Chinese general of the National Revolutionary Army and spy for the Chinese Communist Party.

== Early life ==
Wu was born Wu Cuiwen on 14 September 1894, into a poor family in Luozhou Township, Minhou County, Fujian (now Luozhou Town, Cangshan District of Fuzhou), to Wu Guowan (吳國琬), a teacher. Wu was the second of four sons. He attended Luozhou Village Public School (螺洲鄉公學), Luozhou Primary School (螺洲鄉小學), and Kaizhi School (開智學校).

On 10 October 1911, the revolutionaries successfully launched the Wuchang Uprising, Wu enlisted in the Northern Expedition Student Army. Upon reaching Nanjing, the Northern Expedition was halted due to peace negotiations between the North and South. Wu was assigned to the Wuchang Second Preliminary Officer School for training. Two years later, he advanced to the Baoding Military Academy, where he studied alongside Zhang Zhizhong and Bai Chongxi.

== Northern Expedition ==
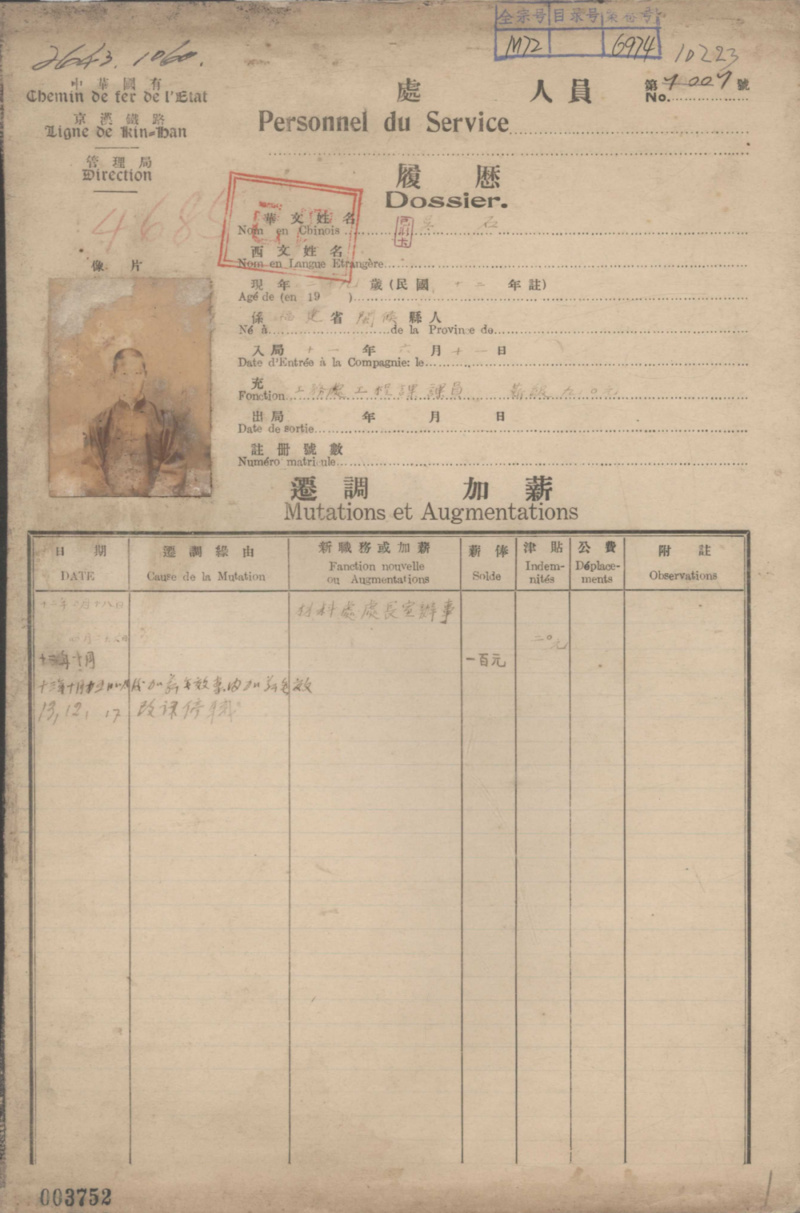
Wu Shi's resume at Peking-Hankow Railway authority in 1922

After graduating in 1918, Wu was ordered to return to Fujian to serve in local forces. Facing suppression by Anhui clique warlord Li Houji (李厚基), he joined a militia organized by his classmate Zhang Zhen (張貞) to drive out Li. After their plans were leaked, Wu fled to Shantou, Guangdong. Collaborating with Fujianese Tongmenghui member Fang Shengtao (方聲濤) and Jiangxi's Li Liejun (李烈鈞), he joined the army formed in Guangdong, which aimed to overthrow Li by force, and served as a captain staff officer. In 1919, Zhang Zhen reemerged in southern Fujian, organizing a militia and appointing himself commander of a mixed brigade. He again recruited Wu, who then transferred from the army to serve as deputy commander of an engineering battalion and company commander. In 1922, Wu suffered from a severe throat illness and left the military to recuperate in Beiping (now Beijing). He was worked at Peking-Hankow Railway authority from 1922 to 1924. In the winter of 1924, he was appointed head of the ordnance department of the 14th Division of the National Army and also commanded artillery units. Seven months later, the National Army established a cadet school in Nanyuan, Beiping, to train officers, and Wu was reassigned as a senior colonel instructor. In the spring of 1926, the National Revolutionary Army was formed in Guangdong and launched the Northern Expedition. Zhang Zhen's Fujian militia was reorganized as the 4th Division of the 1st Army, with Zhang as division commander. Wu was again invited back to serve as chief of staff for Zhang Zhen's unit, soon transitioning to chief of the Operations Section within the General Headquarters' Staff Department.

== Study in Japan ==
In 1927, the National Revolutionary Army General Headquarters was dissolved, forcing Wu into an idle period in Shanghai. Two months later, after the Kuomintang established a provincial government in Fujian under Fang Shengtao, Wu was recalled to serve as chief of the military department's intelligence section. In the winter of 1929, after passing a rigorous examination, Wu was admitted to the Imperial Japanese Army Academy.

== Second Sino-Japanese War ==
After graduating and returning to China in 1934, Wu was appointed director of the Intelligence Department of the General Staff Headquarters, specializing in intelligence work against Japan. During the Battle of Wuhan, Chiang Kai-shek personally met with Wu weekly for detailed consultations and expressed strong approval of his work. In August 1938, during the Wuhan Campaign, Wu organized a "Field Intelligence Staff Training Program" and specifically invited Zhou Enlai and Ye Jianying to lecture on guerrilla warfare.

At the end of 1940, for his role in organizing a crucial campaign during the Battle of South Guangxi which resulted in a major victory, and upon the recommendation of his friend Bai Chongxi, Wu was appointed lieutenant general chief of staff of the Fourth War Zone. In late 1942, the Zhenbian County Government in Guangxi sent an urgent telegram to the Fourth War Zone headquarters, reporting the capture of a Vietnamese man suspected of being a Japanese spy and requesting permission to execute him locally. Wu ordered the man sent to the Fourth War Zone headquarters in Liuzhou instead. Through multiple inquiries, he learned this was the well-known Vietnamese Communist leader Ho Chi Minh. Believing that resisting Japan was a common cause transcending national and party lines, Wu treated Ho Chi Minh with respect, allowed him to reside long-term in Liuzhou, facilitated the establishment of a national alliance by various Vietnamese political factions in Liuzhou, assisted in organizing a military and political cadre training program, and mobilized numerous Vietnamese youth to come to Liuzhou for study.

In 1944, during the Japanese large-scale offensive in Hunan and Guangxi, Nationalist forces retreated steadily. Due to discord between the Central Army and the Guangxi Clique forces, Chiang Kai-shek refused to send reinforcements, leading to a major rout of Wu's corps was part of. Indignantly, Wu resigned his position as chief of staff of the Fourth War Zone.

After the Second Sino-Japanese War came to an end in 1945, Wu participated in the takeover of Shanghai. He later returned to Nanjing, where he served as director of the Historical and Political Bureau of the Ministry of National Defense.

In April 1947, through an introduction by He Sui (何遂), Wu met with Liu Xiao (劉曉), secretary of the East China Bureau of the Chinese Communist Party (CCP), and formally established contact with the CCP. Wu frequently traveled between Shanghai and Nanjing during this period, continuously providing important intelligence, which was relayed to the East China Bureau via the He family residence as a transfer point.

== Operations in Taiwan ==
On 16 July 1949, Wu moved with his family to Taiwan, where he was appointed deputy chief of the General Staff of the Ministry of National Defense. Prior to this, he had arranged for 298 boxes of well-preserved top-secret Kuomintang military archives to be handed over to the People's Liberation Army by his trusted aide Wang Qiang (王强).

On 27 November 1949, Zhu Fen (also known as Zhu Chenzhi) arrived in Taiwan from British Hong Kong and immediately made contact with "Old Zheng" (Cai Xiaoqian, secretary of the Taiwan Provincial Committee of the CCP). A week later, Zhu visited Wu's residence and received microfilm containing highly classified military intelligence, which was transmitted to the East China Bureau Intelligence Department via British Hong Kong. Upon learning of this, Mao Zedong composed a poem: "Stormy waves beat the lonely island, emerald waves reflect the dawn. Loyal souls hide in the tiger's den, the early light of daybreak arrives. (驚濤拍孤島，碧波映天曉；虎穴藏忠魂，曙光迎來早。)"

On 29 January 1950, Cai Xiaoqian, the head of the CCP's underground organization in Taiwan, was arrested and defected, revealing Zhu Fen as a special agent of the East China Bureau. On February 2, Wu sent his aide Nie Xi to urgently inform Zhu that Cai Xiaoqian had been captured and had identified her. He advised her to leave Taiwan immediately. Zhu quickly left her residence and, following Wu's suggestion, moved to the Alishan Grand Hotel. On the evening of February 4, using a special pass issued by Wu at great risk, she boarded a military transport plane to Zhoushan, intending to find a ship to Shanghai.

The Intelligence Bureau found Wu's name in Cai Xiaoqian's notebook but remained only suspicious initially. When Mao Renfeng reported to Chiang Kai-shek, he mentioned it briefly. In a more detailed report to chief of the General Staff Zhou Zhirou, Zhou instructed Mao to conduct further investigation. Gu Zhengwen, head of the special task force, visited Wu's wife, Wang Bikui, pretending to be a former subordinate from Wu's time at the Historical and Political Bureau. Under the guise of concern, he extracted information that Wu had met with Zhu Fen. Cai also confirmed Wu's multiple meetings with Zhu. Mao Renfeng promptly reported this to Chiang Kai-shek, who ordered Zhou Zhirou to investigate Wu immediately. A search of Wu's residence uncovered the special pass he had issued to Zhu Fen.

On February 18, Zhu Fen was arrested in Dinghai by Shen Zhiyue (沈之岳), head of the Intelligence Bureau's Zhejiang station, and Zhuang Xintian (庄心田), director of the Zhejiang Police Security Department. While detained in Shenjiamen, Zhoushan, Zhu attempted suicide by swallowing over two liang of gold extracted from the lining of her leather coat, but she survived and was extradited to Taiwan to stand trial with Wu.

On 1 March 1950, Chiang Kai-shek ordered Wu's arrest on charges of "engaging in espionage for the Chinese Communist Party". Subsequently, his wife Wang Bikui, close friend Lieutenant General Chen Baocang, and aide Colonel Nie Xi were also arrested.

On 30 March 1950, the CIA succinctly summarized Wu Shi's activities as follows:

Wu Shi is the principal figure in the first [subversive] group. He was in contact with Xie Xuehong concerning an operation which involved subversion of the Navy through Wu's influence with Fujianese officers. The plot also included the smuggling of arms, equipment, and personnel in junks from the mainland to the east coast of Taiwan.

== Death ==
At 4:30 PM on 10 June 1950, Wu was executed at Machangding, Taipei, alongside Zhu Fen, Chen Baocang, and Nie Xi. He was 56 years old. Before his death, he composed a poem: "The will of heaven is vast and unknowable, the affairs of the world are even harder to discern. All my life I strove with loyalty and goodness, yet such an end is truly sorrowful. Fifty-seven years as in a dream, fame and ambition all come to naught. But with this handful of a loyal heart, beneath the springs I may face my forebears. (天意茫茫未可窺，遙遙世事更難知。平生殫力唯忠善，如此收場亦太悲。五十七年一夢中，聲名志業總成空。憑將一掬丹心在，泉下差堪對我翁。)"

== Family ==
At the end of 1923, through an introduction by his clansmen, Wu married his fellow townsfolk Wang Bikui (王碧奎). Together, they had six sons and two daughters, in the following order of birth:

- Wu Meicheng (吳美成); first son, deceased in childhood)
- Wu Zhancheng (吳展成); died in infancy)
- Wu Shaocheng (simplified Chinese: 吴韶成; traditional Chinese: 吳韶成); third son, 1927–2015), graduated from the Department of Economics of Nanjing University, subjected to investigation for his father's historical issues during the Cultural Revolution, with his party membership of the CCP suspended for five years, he was chief economist of the Henan Provincial Department of Metallurgy and Building Materials, and was a representative of the 6th and 7th Henan Provincial People's Congresses.
- Wu Kangcheng (吳康成); fourth son, deceased in childhood)
- Wu Jingcheng (吳競成); fifth son, deceased in childhood)
- Wu Lancheng (吴兰成; 吳蘭成); first daughter, 1931–2020), graduated from Shanghai No.1 Medical College, suspended from the party membership of the CCP during the Cultural Revolution due to her father's historical issues, and deprived of medical qualifications but continued treating pediatric patients, she was researcher at the China Academy of Chinese Medical Sciences, and a member of the 6th, 7th, and 8th Beijing Municipal Committees of the Chinese People's Political Consultative Conference.
- Wu Xuecheng (吴学成); second daughter), married at the age of 19. In 1991, she and her husband brought her parents' ashes back to the home of her eldest brother, Wu Shaocheng.
- Wu Jiancheng (吴健成); sixth son), graduated from National Taiwan University and subsequently pursued further studies in the United States.

Wu's wife Wang Bikui was once imprisoned due to her association with Wu. After his sacrifice, she was eventually released through the efforts of Wu's former friends and colleagues. She single-handedly endured immense hardship to raise their two young children alone. It was not until May 1980 that she was able to emigrate to Los Angeles, the United States. In December 1981, through arrangements by relevant departments, Wu Shaocheng and Wu Lancheng traveled to the United States to visit her, reuniting the family. Wang Bikui died in Los Angeles on 9 February 1993, at the age of 90.

== Memorials and commemorations ==
In November 1973, in recognition of Wu's exceptional contributions and under the direct arrangements of Mao Zedong and Zhou Enlai, the state posthumously recognized Wu as a Revolutionary Martyr.

On 20 December 1975, while critically ill, Zhou Enlai met with Luo Qingchang, who was responsible for Taiwan-related work. He stated that the party would never forget its old friends in Taiwan, mentioning two individuals: Zhang Xueliang, who was still alive at the time, and the already sacrificed Wu Shi (another account suggests the second person was Zhang Zhen).

On 4 January 1994, Luo Qingchang inscribed the following dedication for the Album in Commemoration of Martyr Wu Shi: "To appreciate the pine's nobility, await the melting snow. (要知松高洁，待到雪化时。)"

In 1994, Wu Shi's remains were returned to the mainland and interred alongside his wife, Wang Bikui, at the Futian Public Cemetery on the outskirts of Beijing. Their final resting place is adjacent to the grave of his close friend He Sui.

In 2013, the "Square of the Unknown Heroes" was completed at the Beijing West Mountain National Forest Park. White marble statues of Wu Shi, Zhu Feng, Chen Baocang, and Nie Xi stand prominently in the square.

Wu's birthplace, located at No. 1 Jiangqian Cheng, Wucuo Village, Luozhou Town, Cangshan District of Fuzhou, Fujian, now serves as a Red Culture education base and tourist site.

== Film and Television Portrayals ==
| Year | English title | Chinese title | Actor | Ref. |
|---|---|---|---|---|
| 2009 | Lurk | 潜伏 | Sun Honglei | |
| 2018 | A Changed World | 换了人间 | Xu Wenguang | |
| 2025 | Silent Honor | 沉默的荣耀 | Yu Hewei | |
