= Cai Xiaoqian =

Chinese Communist politician and defector (1904–1982)

- 蔡孝乾
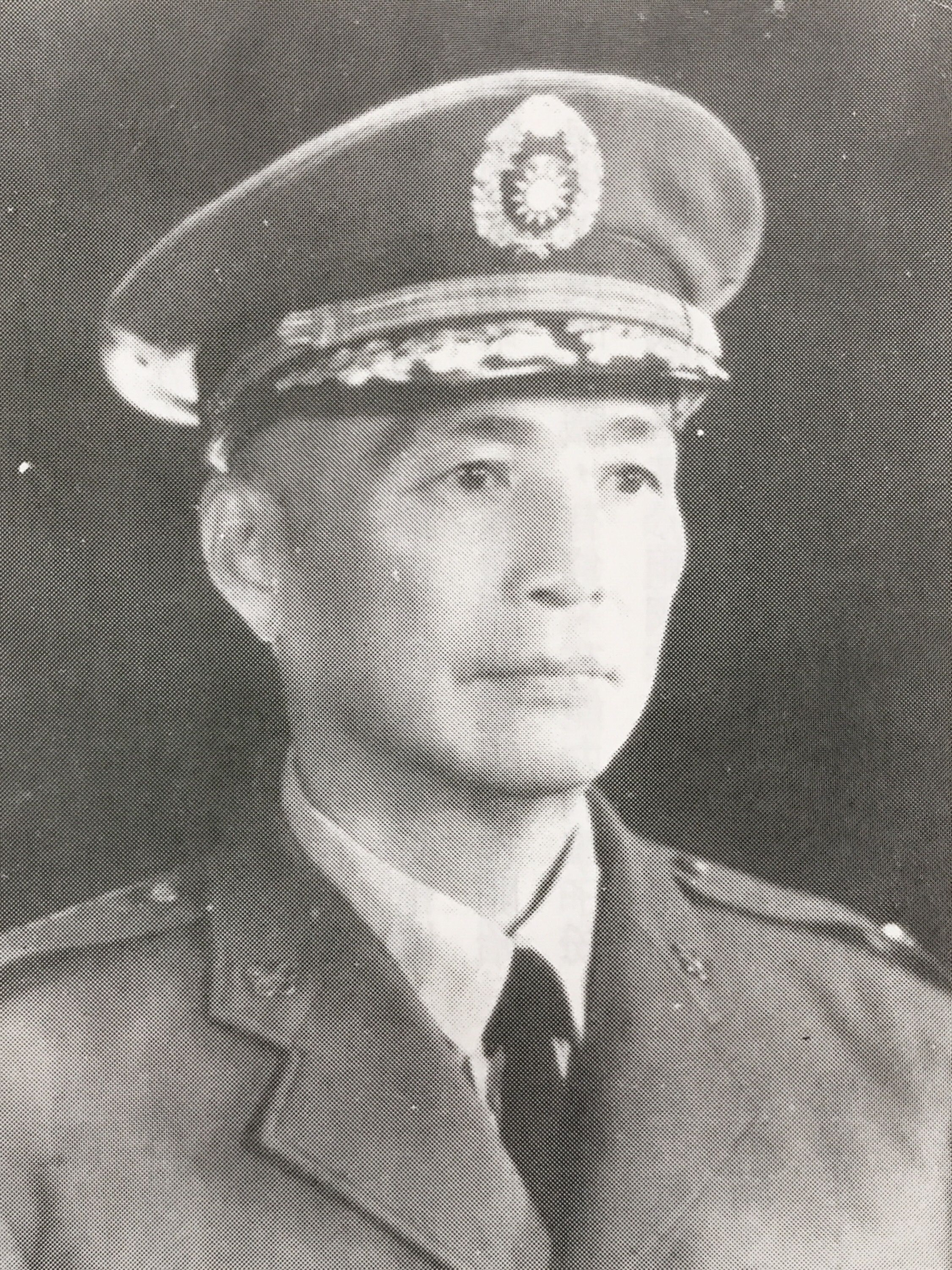
- Cai in Republic of China Army uniform

Secretary of the Taiwan Provincial Working Committee of the Chinese Communist Party
- In office August 1946 – March 1950
- Preceded by: Committee established
- Succeeded by: Committee abolished

Personal details
- Born: 22 January 1904 Huatan, Taichū Prefecture, Japanese Taiwan
- Died: 8 October 1982 (aged 78) Beitou District, Taipei, Taiwan Province, Republic of China
- Party: Kuomintang (1950–1982)
- Other political affiliations: Taiwanese Communist Party (1928–1931); Chinese Communist Party (1925–1950)
- Education: Shanghai University

Military service
- Allegiance: Republic of China
- Branch/service: Republic of China Army
- Years of service: 1956–1982
- Rank: Major general

Cai Xiaoqian (Chinese: 蔡孝乾; pinyin: Cài Xiàoqián; Wade–Giles: Tsai Hsiao-chien; Taiwanese Hokkien: Tshuà Hàu-khiân; 22 January 1904 - 8 October 1982) was a Taiwan-born Chinese Communist politician who served as the secretary of the Taiwan Provincial Working Committee of the Chinese Communist Party. He defected to the Kuomintang after he was arrested in 1950, revealing his knowledge of the Chinese Communist Party's underground operations in Taiwan. For his contribution to the dismantling of the communist networks in Taiwan, he was promoted to major general of the Republic of China Army in 1956.

== Career ==
Cai was born in modern Huatan, Japanese Taiwan in 1904. He left for mainland China in 1924 to study at the Department of Social Sciences at the Kuomintang-Communist operated Shanghai University. He joined the Chinese Communist Party in 1925. He returned to his hometown in 1927, where he was imprisoned for 10 months after promoting communist ideology. In 1928, he joined the Taiwanese Communist Party in Shanghai and served as director of the party's Propaganda and Agitation Department. Under pressure from the Japanese authorities, the party dissolved in 1931.

In 1932, Cai became the editor for the Warrior Newspaper (戰士報) of the Political Department of the Chinese Red Army's 1st Corps. In 1934, he was elected as a member of the Central Committee of the Chinese Soviet Republic. He was the only Taiwan native who participated in the Long March. He then served as the Minister of the Interior of the Chinese Soviet Republic. In 1940, he served as the Minister of the Enemy Workers Department.

In September 1945 he was sent by the Communist Party to Taiwan and was tasked with managing the Taiwan Provincial Working Committee of the Chinese Communist Party. The February 28 incident in 1947 caused a rise in members for the Taiwan Provincial Working Committee; in 1948, Cai became an editor of the anti-Kuomintang Guangming Daily (光明報) newspaper founded by middle school principal Chung Hao-tung, brother of Chung Li-ho. After copies of the paper were sent by Chen Cheng to Chiang Kai-shek, Chiang personally ordered a thorough investigation into it.

== Arrest and defection ==
The investigation into the Guangming Daily saw the arrest of many communists in Taiwan. In early 1950, a key liaison between Cai and Wu Shi, another CCP spy and Republic of China Army lieutenant general, was arrested. Cai went into hiding, but was captured and arrested by April. While in prison, he defected to the Kuomintang, revealing his knowledge of the underground communist operations in Taiwan. Some of Cai's comrades defected to the Kuomintang as well, while others, including Zhu Feng and lieutenant general Wu Shi were executed later in 1950.

The Nationalist government rewarded Cai with a promotion to major general in the Republic of China Army and a position as the deputy director of the Ministry of Justice Investigation Bureau, although he was under some degree of surveillance for the rest of his life.

Cai died at the Taipei Veterans General Hospital on 8 October 1982 at the age of 78, and was buried at the Yangmingshan First Cemetery in Beitou District.
