= Formosa Chang =

Taiwanese fast casual restaurant chain

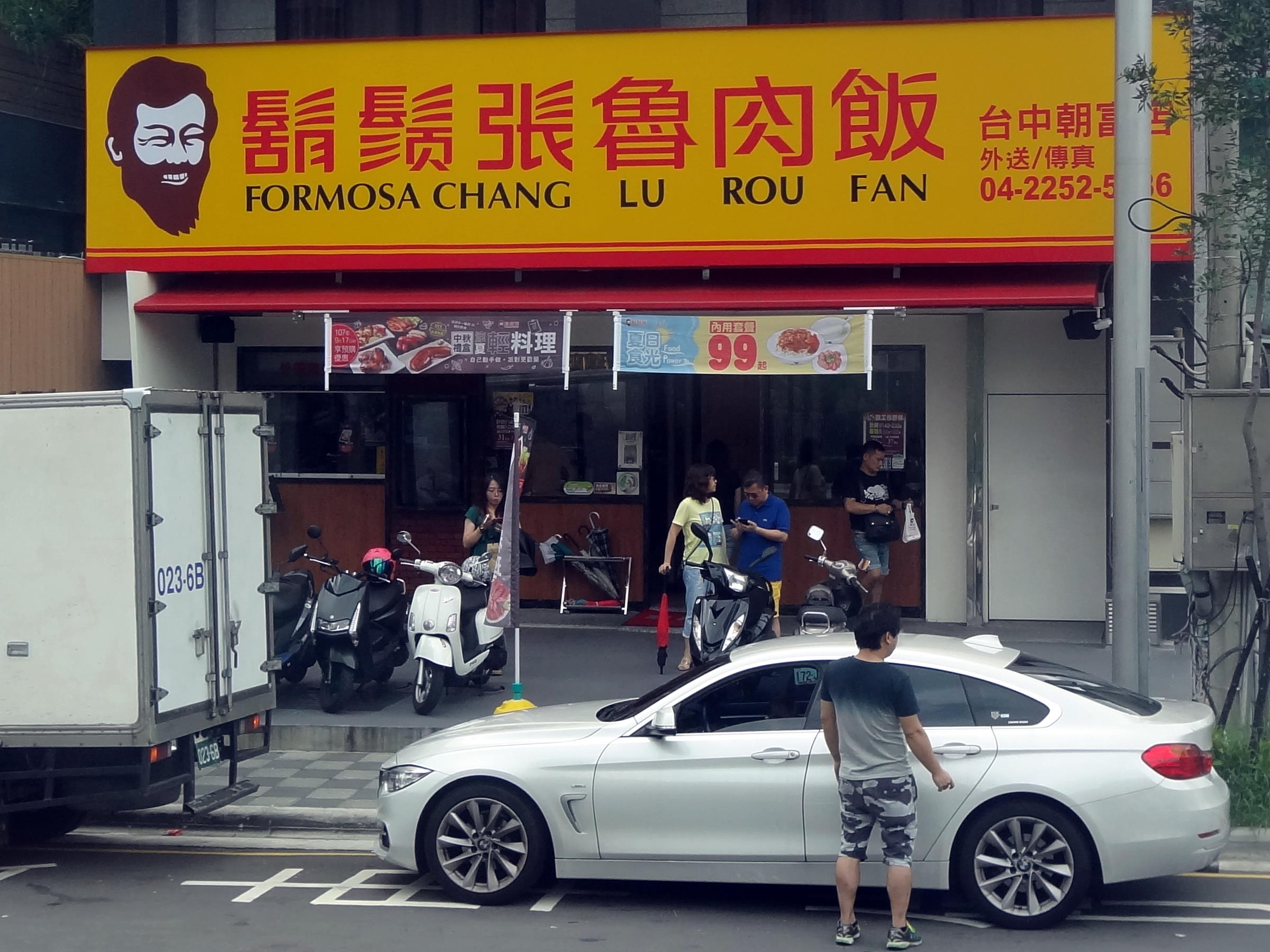
- Formosa Chang branch on Taichung's Chaofu Road in 2018
- Native name: 鬍鬚張
- Type: Private
- Industry: Food
- Founded: 1960 in Taipei, Taiwan
- Founder: Chang Yan-chuan
- Headquarters: Taipei, Taiwan
- Number of locations: 144 (2024)
- Area served: Taiwan
- Key people: Chang Yung-chang (chairman)
- Products: Taiwanese cuisine
- Brands: Jing Jian Kang

Chinese name
- Traditional Chinese: 鬍鬚張
- Simplified Chinese: 胡须张
Transcriptions
Standard Mandarin
- Hanyu Pinyin: Húxū Zhāng
- Wade–Giles: Hu Hsiu Chang
Yue: Cantonese
- Jyutping: Wu^{4} Se^{1} Zoeng^{1}
- Website: www.fmsc.com.tw/en/index.php

Formosa Chang (traditional Chinese: 鬍鬚張; simplified Chinese: 胡须张) is a Taiwanese fast casual restaurant chain. The restaurant's signature dish is minced pork rice. In 1960, Chang Yan-chuan (Chinese: 張炎泉) started a street food stall selling traditional Taiwanese snacks at Shuanglian Market (Chinese: 雙連市場) on Minsheng West Road in Taipei. The stall relocated in 1971 to Ningxia Road. At the urging of his eldest son, Chang Yung-chang (Chinese: 張永昌), he moved the business into a storefront at Ningxia Night Market in 1979. Inspired by McDonald's, the younger Chang revamped the family business through implementing business management strategies. He focused on creating a consistent dining experience, emphasizing precise food preparation and fast service.

The younger Chang started the Formosa Chang brand in 1986, took over the business after his father's death in 1989, and introduced franchising in 1993. The company expanded rapidly in the mid-1990s, but this growth led to issues with quality control, particularly among franchisees. After the 1997 foot-and-mouth disease outbreak, Formosa Chang shifted away from franchising and focused on directly operated stores to improve consistency and quality. The company later ventured internationally, opening branches in both Japan and mainland China in 2003. As its customer base had gotten older, Formosa Chang in 2008 targeted younger consumers through modernized branding and marketing. The company faced an avalanche of criticism from the media for raising prices in 2012, causing it to reverse the hikes. Formosa Chang in 2024 started a health-conscious brand, Jing Jian Kang (Chinese: 京簡康). In 2024, Formosa Chang has 73 locations in Taiwan, 68 in China, and three in Japan.

The restaurant's customers largely are from the middle class. Formosa Chang started a partnership with China Airlines in 2010 to serve airline meals containing their minced pork rice. It partnered with the convenience store Hi-Life to sell baozi. The company's distinctive logo is in homage to its founder, who worked such long hours that he lacked the time to trim his beard. It features his smiling face, creased at the sides and with a thick beard. Formosa Chang partnered with the T-shirt design firm Pizza Cut Five in 2008 to sell T-shirts featuring the logo.

== History ==
=== Street food stall ===
Formosa Chang's founder, Chang Yan-chuan (Chinese: 張炎泉), was a carpenter from Yunlin County. After moving to Taipei in search of work, he switched to the food industry upon being confronted with the effects of industrial automation, which had reduced his income. In 1960, Chang began operating a street food stall called Shuanglian Minced Pork Rice (Chinese: 雙連魯肉飯) in Shuanglian Market (Chinese: 雙連市場) on Minsheng West Road. Offering traditional Taiwanese snacks such as minced pork rice and braised pig's trotters, it was located across from the Shuanglian police substation for around a decade. Owing to a road widening, Chang relocated his stall in 1971 to Ningxia Road near the Chien-Cheng Circle. At that location, business steadily grew, allowing Chang to raise five children. Chang's stall initially also served salty porridge and tube rice pudding. After observing that glutinous rice is hard for people's digestive systems, he chose to offer only minced pork rice to customers. In 1975, Chang's home was razed by a fire of unknown origin, destroying all of Chang's family's possessions except for the clothes they wore, some tableware, and the cart they used for their street stall.

Early in the stall's history, the head chef of the famous restaurant Café Werthers ate there and criticized the minced pork rice dish, saying, "What kind of minced pork rice is this? How dare you sell something like this?" Chang did not know the man's identity but asked him what minced pork rice would taste good. The chef gave Chang three tips, "The rice should be freshly harvested, the meat should be sliced, and the soy sauce should be pure brewed." For three years, the chef ate at Chang's stall and gave him tips about how to improve the dish. Chang did not learn the man's identity until numerous years later when he attended the man's wedding where his fellow guests included well-known restaurant chefs.

Each day, Chang and his wife woke up at 12:30 pm to make the food. At 5 pm, they got their stall ready and labored until 2 am. After buying the next day's ingredients at 4:30 am, they went to bed. Their son, Chang Yung-chang (Chinese: 張永昌), observed that his parents were criticized for disturbing the neighbors' sleep when bringing their cart back at night. Starting when he was six years old, he had started working alongside his father at the stall. When he finished school for the day, he took dishes to diners and cleared off the tables. Up until he joined the military, Chang Yung-chang and his family spent 20-hour days at the stall. Upon finishing his service in the military, Chang Yung-chang advised his father that it was not the best use of time to do 12 hours of preparation every day to accomplish eight hours of serving customers. Pushing equipment weighing dozens of kilograms was physically exhausting. He told his father he planned to switch careers if his father did not relocate their shop to a legitimate store space. The father and son had a difference of opinion about this for two years as the father felt that a rent of NT$80,000 (US$2,864) was too risky. Although the older Chang called his son a "beggar with ambitions", he begrudgingly consented after the hardware store behind their stall shut down in 1979.

=== First branch and McDonald's influence ===
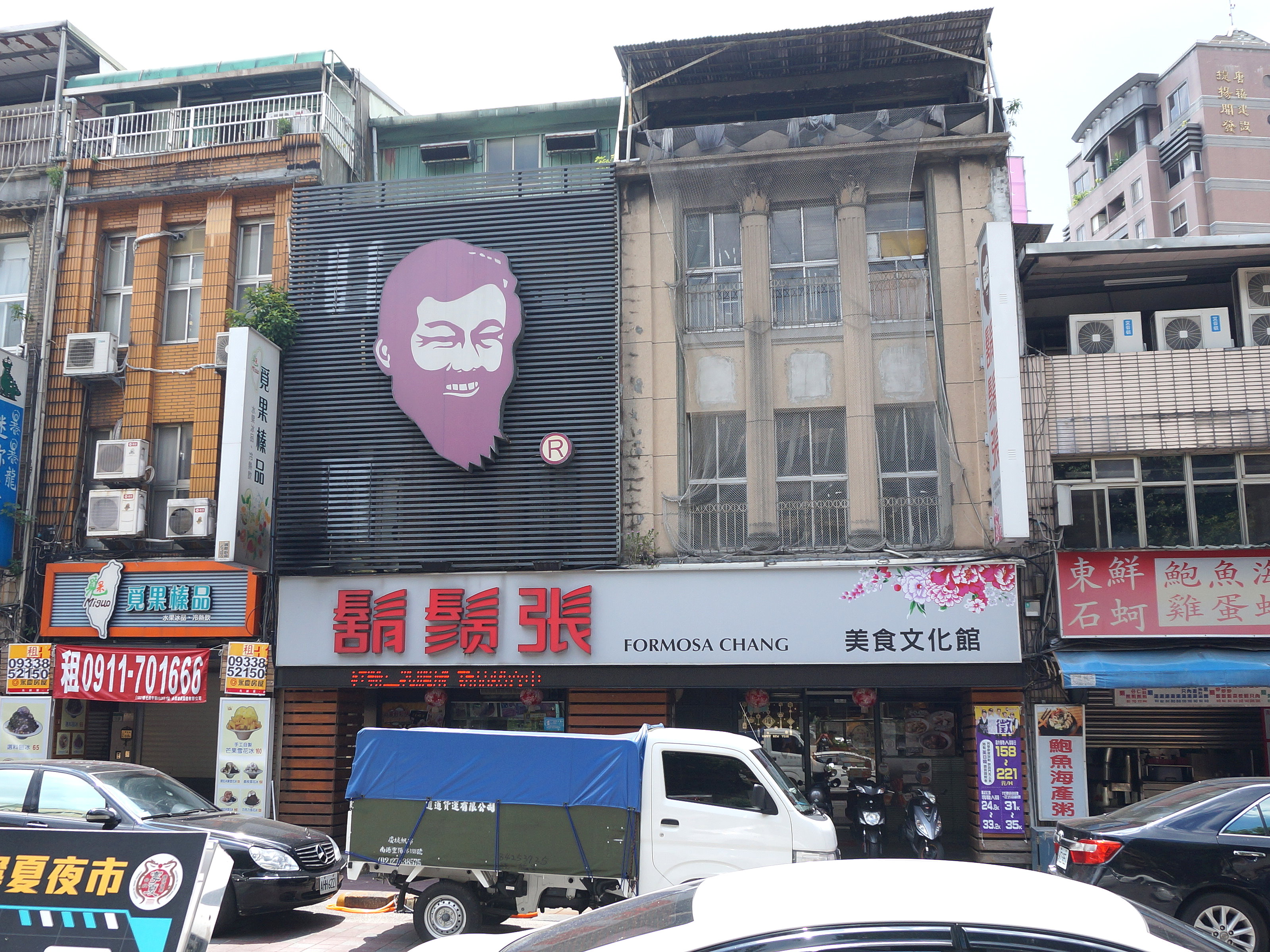
The Formosa Chang Gourmet Culture Hall at the restaurant's first location on Ningxia Road in Taipei's Datong District in 2020

In 1979, the older Chang established the restaurant's first branch at the storefront at Ningxia Night Market, sharing the space with another stall. The Changs paid a monthly rent of NT$40,000 (US$1,432) for the space. This allowed them to begin serving lunch which attracted nearby residents and workers to patronize the business. When they had operated a stall, their daily revenue ranged from NT$7,000 to NT$8,000 (US$251 to US$286). Daily revenue with the new storefront grew to NT$12,000 (US$430) in three months and surpassed NT$25,000 (US$895) in six months. After a year, Chang ended the partnership with the other stall, renting the entire venue. After the business improved, the restaurant began operating for the entire day. With the move to a storefront, they transitioned from preparing meals in a home kitchen to preparing them at a central production facility.

As a guest at a wedding reception at the seafood restaurant Hai Pa Wang, Chang Yung-chang found that it had air conditioning, which kept diners comfortable while eating. Inspired by this, he convinced his father to put in fans at Formosa Chang. In 1983, Chang spent several hundred thousand New Taiwanese dollars to install air conditioning and to receive ISO certification. Daily revenue increased to NT$100,000 (US$3,580) one year after the installation. McDonald's opened its first branch in Taiwan in 1984 and greatly influenced the local dining scene. The chairman of Hsin Tung Yang, a friend of Chang's father, frequently ate at the Changs' stall, and encouraged them to learn from McDonald's. Chang reviewed McDonald's operations and was fascinated by how McDonald's did not have a greasy atmosphere. He and his father traveled between 30 and 40 times to McDonald's to observe how the business operated. Galvanized by McDonald's corporate practices, he resolved to revamp the family business through implementing business management strategies. By 1986, the Ningxia Road restaurant had undergone a rebranding to be modeled like McDonald's but serve Taiwanese snacks. The restaurant emphasized good customer service, a roomy and well-lit layout, an illuminated menu, disposable utensils, and soup containers made from aluminum foil. The restaurant started a factory to produce snacks that were pre-cooked, allowing diners to save time by just having to reheat the snacks.

=== Corporate branding, founder's death, and competition ===
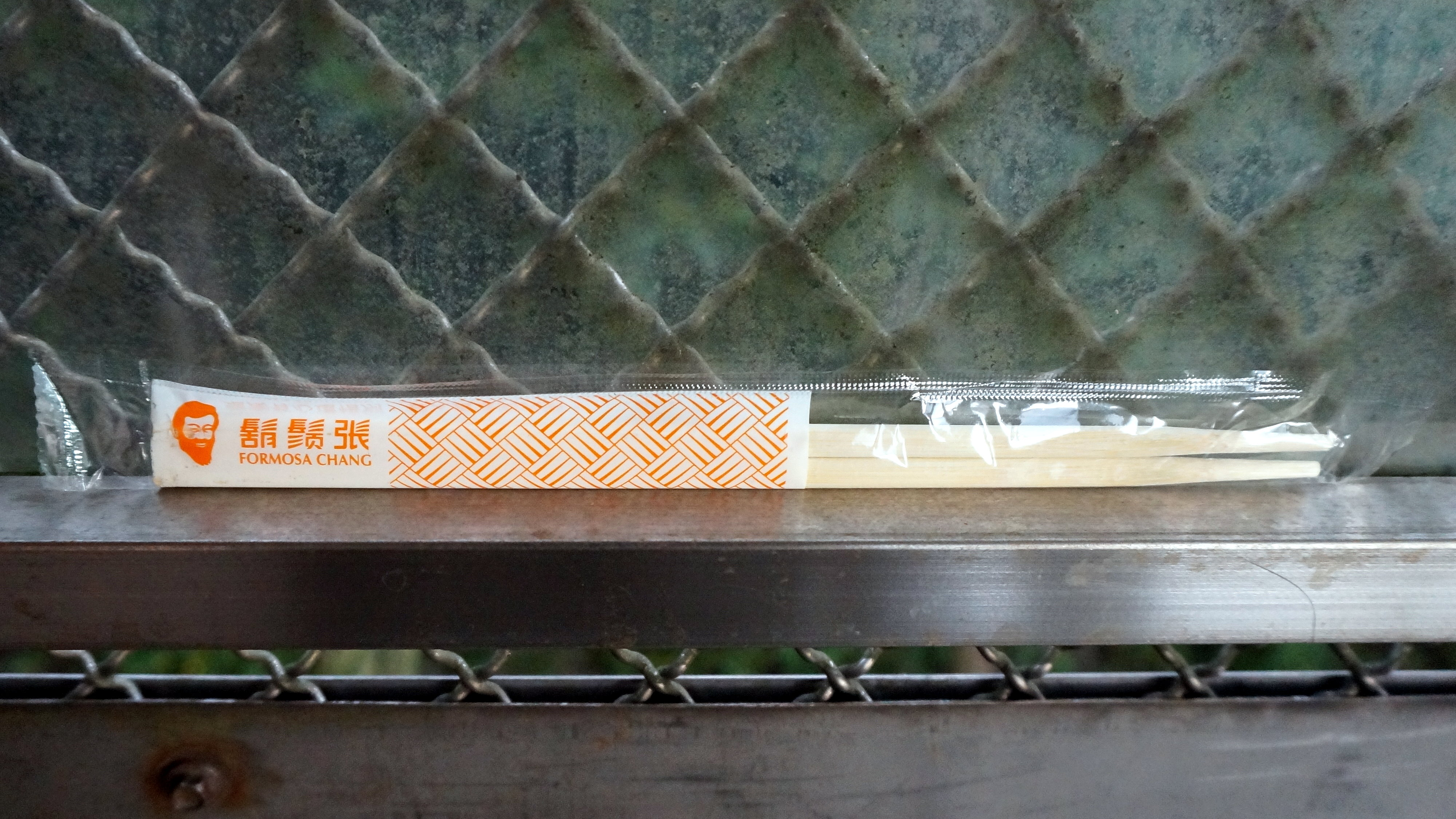
Formosa Chang-branded disposable chopsticks

Chang started the Formosa Chang brand in 1986 and registered the name with the Ministry of Economic Affairs. He put in place corporate branding including for the restaurant's receipts, chopsticks, napkins, and employee uniforms. Chang became the company's chairman in 1986 and that year the company introduced profit sharing for employees. He created operations manuals for each aspect of preparing food such as how much each minced pork rice bowl would weigh, how much time it would take to blanch vegetables, and the exact seasoning needed for dishes like bamboo shoots and braised pig's trotters. The aim was to enforce consistency in the quality and serving time. The company set a goal to serve each dish within 59 seconds of the customer's placing their order. Chang's attempt to redesign all the branches in the style of Western fast food was unsuccessful. After one year, he decided to retain fast food's reliable and efficient standard but keep Taiwanese cuisine's familiarity.

The company Formosa Chang Fast Food Co., Ltd. (Chinese: 鬍鬚張速食有限公司) was incorporated in 1987. That year, Chang began the restaurant's second branch at Taipei's Chongqing North Road. In 1989, Chang Yan-chuan, his father and the company's founder, died during an accident while fishing at sea. The external perception was that with its leader gone, Formosa Chang would go out of business. At the time, the founder's oldest son, Chang Yung-chang, was the manager of a small branch. When the family met, they chose Chang Yung-chang to become its next leader. Chang resolved to start a new branch within a month to quell the external doubts in the company.

Another challenge arose with the founding of the competitor Hometown Minced Pork Rice (Chinese: 故鄉魯肉飯). The brand gained success by 1991, receiving the endorsement of the well-known singer Yeh Hsien-hsiu and expanding to 187 branches in Taiwan by 1998. Amid this rise of competition, Formosa Chang's founder Chang Yan-chuan's wife died of acute hepatitis while on holiday in Germany in 1991, further fueling the external perception that the company was in trouble. Chang Yung-chang resolved to open the company's fifth and sixth branches in two months to allay the concerns. Formosa Chang started its fifth branch on Chenggong Road in Neihu in 1991. That year, it served between 8,000 and 10,000 dishes of minced pork rice each day. By the 20th century, Hometown Minced Pork Rice had faded while Formosa Chang continued to grow.

=== Start of franchising ===
By 1992, the restaurant began expanding from northern Taipei to the Eastern District, which the Economic Daily News said signaled its aim to compete with the Western fast food chains that are prevalent in the lively Eastern District. To produce the minced pork rice for its increased number of branches, Formosa Chang spent NT$200 million (US$7,160,246) to build a central production facility spanning several hundred ping at New Taipei Industrial Park. Chang began franchising the restaurant in 1993. Franchisees had to pay an annual fee of NT$300,000 (US$10,740) and a monthly fee of NT$12,000 (US$430) for branding services and support. Franchisees were required to invest about NT$1.8 million (US$64,442) to start their branch as well as rent or own a venue of 33 ping (110 m^{2}; 1,200 sq ft). In late 1994, Formosa Chang had added 24 franchise locations that year. By the end of 1995, the restaurant had 50 branches.

As the number of branches grew, the original central kitchen could no longer meet production demands, prompting Chang to open a larger facility in Wugu. The facility size grew from 90 ping (300 m^{2}; 3,200 sq ft) to 480 ping (1,600 m^{2}; 17,000 sq ft). The growing scale of operations compelled Formosa Chang to expand by opening more stores to prevent financial losses. In 1995, the company greatly expanded its store count. For two years, it started two or three new branches per month throughout Taiwan. Although the quick growth boosted the brand's recognition, it also resulted in substantial reputation harm. The food at the flagship location tasted differently from the branches and the franchisees struggled to adhere to the company's policies. As a result of the overly fast expansion, numerous branches went out of business shortly after opening and customer satisfaction went down.

=== Foot-and-mouth disease and move away from franchising ===
Taiwan experienced a major outbreak of foot-and-mouth disease in 1997, causing the business to lose over NT$10 million (US$358,012) in two quarters. In the first 10 days after the outbreak, sales fell by 60% as customers did not want to eat pork, which had become associated with the disease. Formosa Chang posted notices on the door informing customers they also sold chicken curry and beef brisket rice. Before the outbreak, the company had reached a high of 63 branches. Within a year, over a dozen stores shut down. Chang closed down franchises that were underperforming and pushed forward with a model of having operators directly own the stores. He took these actions to improve the company's reputation which had been damaged by the overly rapid expansion. His decisions were shaped by the insights he gained from a one-year management program offered by the Ministry of Economic Affairs. In 1999, Chang launched the ISO 9001 quality management system and enacted total quality management to enhance the business's operations. By 2004, the number of stores in Taiwan had declined to 18, of which four were owned by franchisees. As the company had faced challenges in controlling franchises, the decline aligned with its decision to move away from expanding by opening new franchises.

=== Expansion to Japan and mainland China ===
Formosa Chang approved the Japanese hardware company Miwa Honten to be its regional franchise agent in Tokyo in 1999. Its first branch in Japan opened in 2003. It marked the first time that a Taiwanese street food company had established a presence in Japan. Initially, the Japanese branches struggled as their dishes did not resonate with the local market. After enlisting the advice of China Productivity Center, Formosa Chang transported ingredients and condiments from its central facility in Taiwan to Japan. The Japanese teams then adapted the sauce to cater to the Japanese palate which favors saltier tastes. To cater to local tastes, they eliminated dishes that had pig trotters, reduced the number of soup dishes, and sold beer.

In 2003 in the midst of the 2002–2004 SARS outbreak, Formosa Chang gave a mainland Chinese company permission to start a branch in Shandong. After the branch launched on 1 May, the mainland Chinese company said customers did not like the food and found it to be too costly. The Shandong branch closed, causing the company to lose money. Realizing during the outbreak that franchisees would only continue running the business when they could make profits, Chang decided to stop extending contracts with the stores.

Beginning in 2001 or 2002, Formosa Chang hosted a speed eating competition. At the 2003 competition, people competed at the Ningxia Night Market to eat the most minced pork rice in five minutes. The highest number of bowls consumed that year was nine. The 2008 competition was canceled after a contestant choked to death at an unaffiliated eating competition.

=== Catering to younger diners and new brand, Jing Jian Kang ===
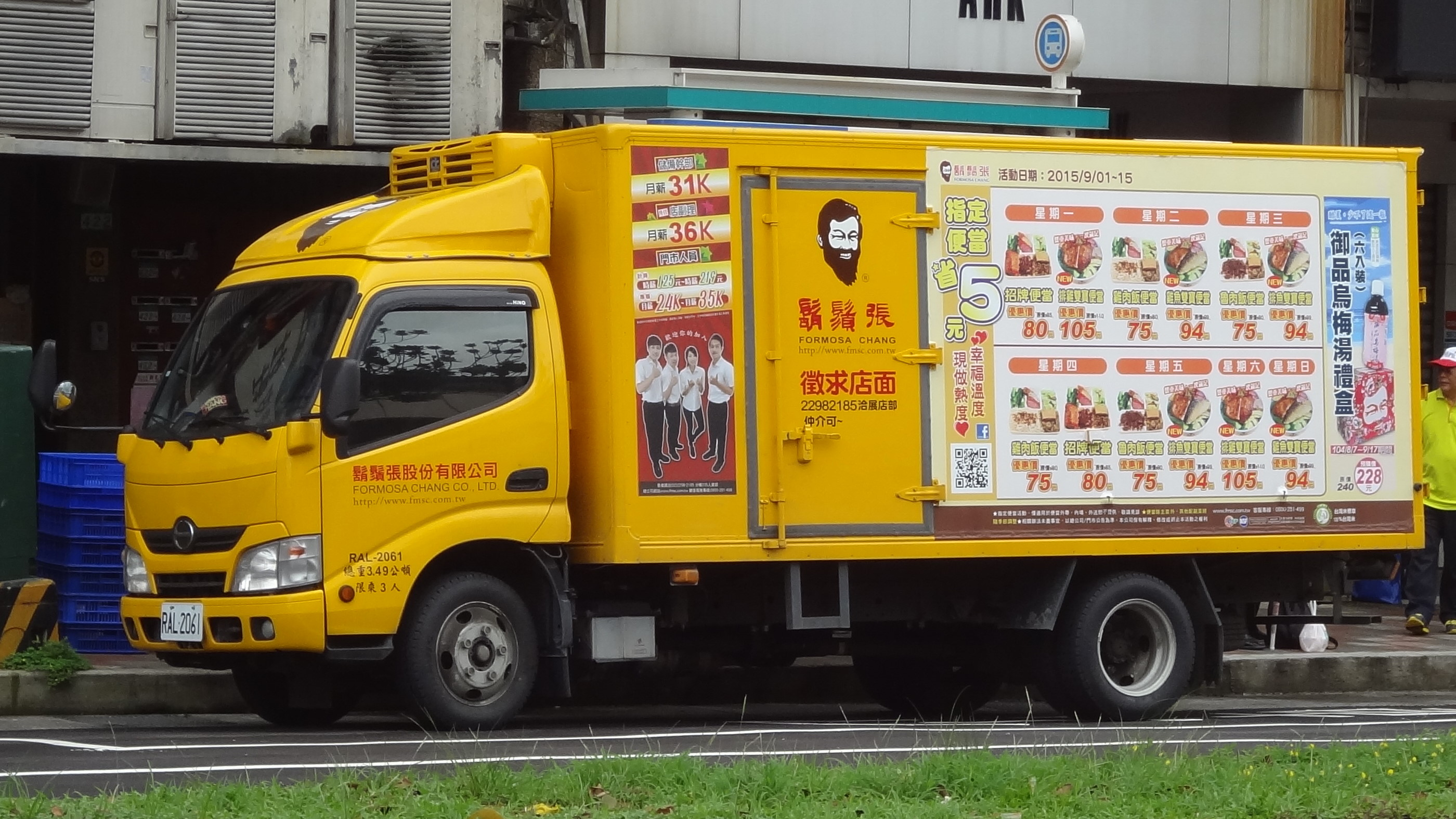
Formosa Chang's Hino 300 refrigerated truck in 2015

In 2003, the company allowed executives to purchase stock which gave them the opportunity to receive a share of the company's profits. By 2013, the company had 191 shareholders, who largely were company executives. In the late 2000s, Formosa Chang was opening around one branch each year. At the end of 2008, the company had 750 employees who worked in 30 branches in Taiwan and three in Japan, giving it an annual revenue of NT$600 million (US$21,480,739).

By 2008, the restaurant focused its marketing efforts on appealing to a younger demographic—people ages 15 to 30—to counter an aging customer base. It became a sponsor of the band Chthonic, which was known for having a rebellious image; opened an online store; and created T-shirts featuring Formosa Chang's logo and a hollow-eyed skull paired with two crossed white bones. By 2010, Formosa Chang had 39 branches which brought in a yearly revenue of NT$600 million (US$21,480,739). That year, it was the second largest Chinese-style fast food chain in Taiwan, behind only Mercuries Food Chain. The restaurant's branches in 2014 largely were in Taiwan's north in large commercial areas. In Greater Taipei in 2011, the chain had over 30 branches. The company in the 2010s began expanding southwards from Greater Taipei to Hsinchu and Taichung. David Chen of the Taipei Times in 2011 called Formosa Chang a noteworthy business that had effectively commercialized street food classics on a large scale.

Formosa Chang launched its 50th branch in 2014 close to Far Eastern Memorial Hospital. It was the chain's first branch to implement a revamped store format to mimic a fast food restaurant. In the previous format, customers placed orders through a server. In the new format, customers place orders at a checkout counter on stepping into the restaurant. Previously showcasing a traditional Taiwanese aesthetic, the new branch adopted a modern setup with well-lit tables, dining chairs with backrests, and more sinks, catering to contemporary concerns about food hygiene. The new branch moved from an à la carte to a set menu. The restaurant changed the logo, revising Chang's beard from having three wrinkles to having two. The primary goal of these changes was to draw in younger diners between the ages of 15 and 30. The restaurant's primary customers at the time were between the ages of 30 and 50.

In 2017, the company spent NT$295 million (US$10,561,363) to purchase 372 ping (1,230 m^{2}; 13,200 sq ft) of land at Wugu District in New Taipei City. It invested an additional NT$88 million (US$3,150,508) to construct a factory on the site, their second. Formosa Chang spent NT$25 million (US$895,031) in 2019 to support mobile payments in its stores through a new point of sale system. It added kiosks to allow customers to do self-service as well as kitchen display systems and tablet ordering systems. The National Animal Industry Foundation authorized the company to label its products as being "Taiwan Pork" certified, meaning that the pork is from Taiwan. The restaurant sparked controversy in 2020 after it put the label on a lunchbox—braised pork containing anka—that had Spanish-produced pork. To abide by the label guidelines, the company paused the lunchbox sales. In 2024, the company had 73 branches in Taiwan, 68 branches in China, and 3 branches in Japan. That year, Formosa Chang started a new restaurant brand named Jing Jian Kang (Chinese: 京簡康), which literally means "Capital Simple Health". With the aim of targeting health-conscious consumers, the restaurant serves dishes that have little sugar, oil, and fat. Its dishes are steamed and baked.

== Menu ==
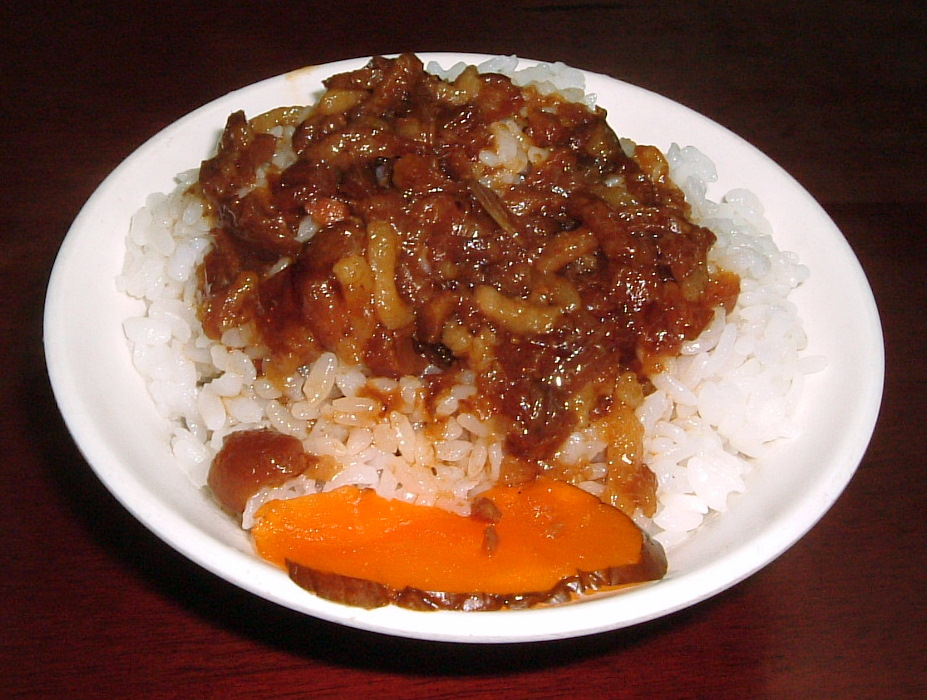
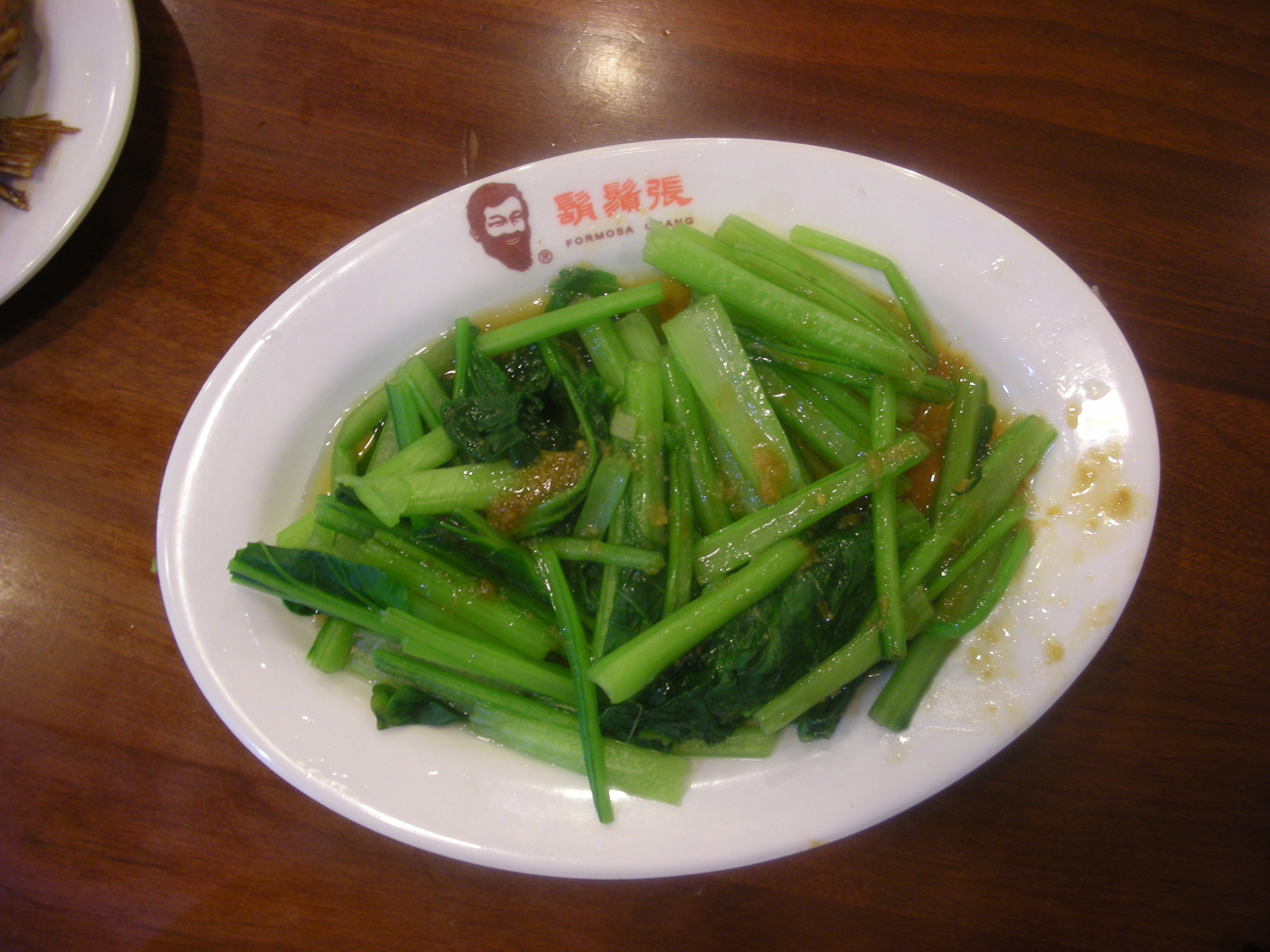
Minced pork rice and a plate of vegetables from Formosa Chang restaurants.

Formosa Chang offers traditional Taiwanese cuisine, serving street food classics. In 2003, the restaurant served enoki mushroom pork rib soup, bamboo shoots, and lotus flower chicken soup. The restaurant serves fried pork chops as well as sweet potato leaves containing a hint of fermented bean paste and served with minced pork rice. The minced pork rice is drenched in sweet soy sauce. At Taipei City's Traditional Food Carnival (Chinese: 台北市傳統美食嘉年華會), the dish secured a public's pick honor in the 2000s. Although he liked that the dish "taste[d] fresh and homemade", David Chen of the Taipei Times in 2011 criticized the chain for offering its minced pork rice at a higher price than similar dishes at other restaurants. Chen said the restaurant promoted roast salted pork (Chinese: 石板鹹豬肉) but that the dish was an "utter disappointment" in looking far less appealing as what is shown in the image. Other Taiwanese classics the chain serves are chicken and rice, bitter melon and pork ribs soup, and four herbs soup. The restaurant serves lunchboxes which Chen praised as "good value". It offers frozen gift packages.

== Customers ==
In the 1980s, the Formosa Chang branch on Ningxia Road, which was modeled after McDonald's, attracted a clientele of civil servants and students, while the wider population was still drawn to street stalls. In the early 2000s, Formosa Chang's Taiwanese branches largely served people between 25 and 40 years old. Japan did not have a minced pork rice dish, which is the restaurant's signature dish, so Formosa Chang's Japanese branches in the 1990s largely served people between 19 and 30 years old who had more adventurous palates. In 2023, most of the restaurant's customers were from the middle class.

== Logo ==
The founder, Chang Yen-chuan, slept around three to four hours every day when he ran a stall selling minced pork rice. Owing to his busyness, he did not have time to tidy his beard and regular diners began calling him "Formosa Chang". The restaurant's distinctive logo features the creator, a man between 40 and 50 years old with a thick beard. The logo most commonly encountered shows him with creases at the side of his eyes and a smiling face. In 2008, the chain collaborated with the niche T-shirt design firm Pizza Cut Five to make T-shirts showcasing its logo. 10,000 T-shirts were sold in the first three months after they were released in 2008. The United Daily News attributed the 10% increase in 2009 in youths eating at Formosa Chang to the T-shirts. The T-shirts, which were well-received, had Chang's head styled in an array of pop art designs. For their uniforms, employees wore black T-shirts containing the hot pink-colored phrase "Formosa Chang Cut Five". In 2011, Pizza Cut Five released Formosa Chang-branded T-shirts featuring five well-known movie characters including The Godfather and The Dark Knight.

== Decor and ambience ==
Formosa Chang is a fast casual restaurant. It has a yellow storefront and decorations. Its ambiance is designed to evoke a traditional Taiwanese restaurant's charm. It has Hakka fabric; brown, wooden stools and tables; and red brick walls. To create an authentic Taiwanese atmosphere, the restaurant decorated the kitchen entrance with the Chinese characters for kitchen (Chinese: 灶腳). Formosa Chang has soothing jazz melodies that fill the air, which David Chen of the Taipei Times said echoes Starbucks. Min Sheng Bao reported in 1991 that Formosa Chang houses a "cultural showcase" in each newly opened branch. It features the rice ladles and ceramic rice bowls that the founder had used three decades prior.

Before the COVID-19 pandemic, a branch on average was 50 ping (170 m^{2}; 1,800 sq ft). Sales before the pandemic were split between 60% takeaway and delivery and 40% dine-in but changed to 80% for takeaway and 20% for dine-in in May 2022 in the midst of the pandemic. To support a target of 50% takeaway and 50% dine-in after the pandemic, the chain planned to reduce 50-ping branches to 30 to 35 ping (99 to 116 m^{2}; 1,100 to 1,200 sq ft) and 40-ping stores to 25 ping (83 m^{2}; 890 sq ft).

== Price increases ==
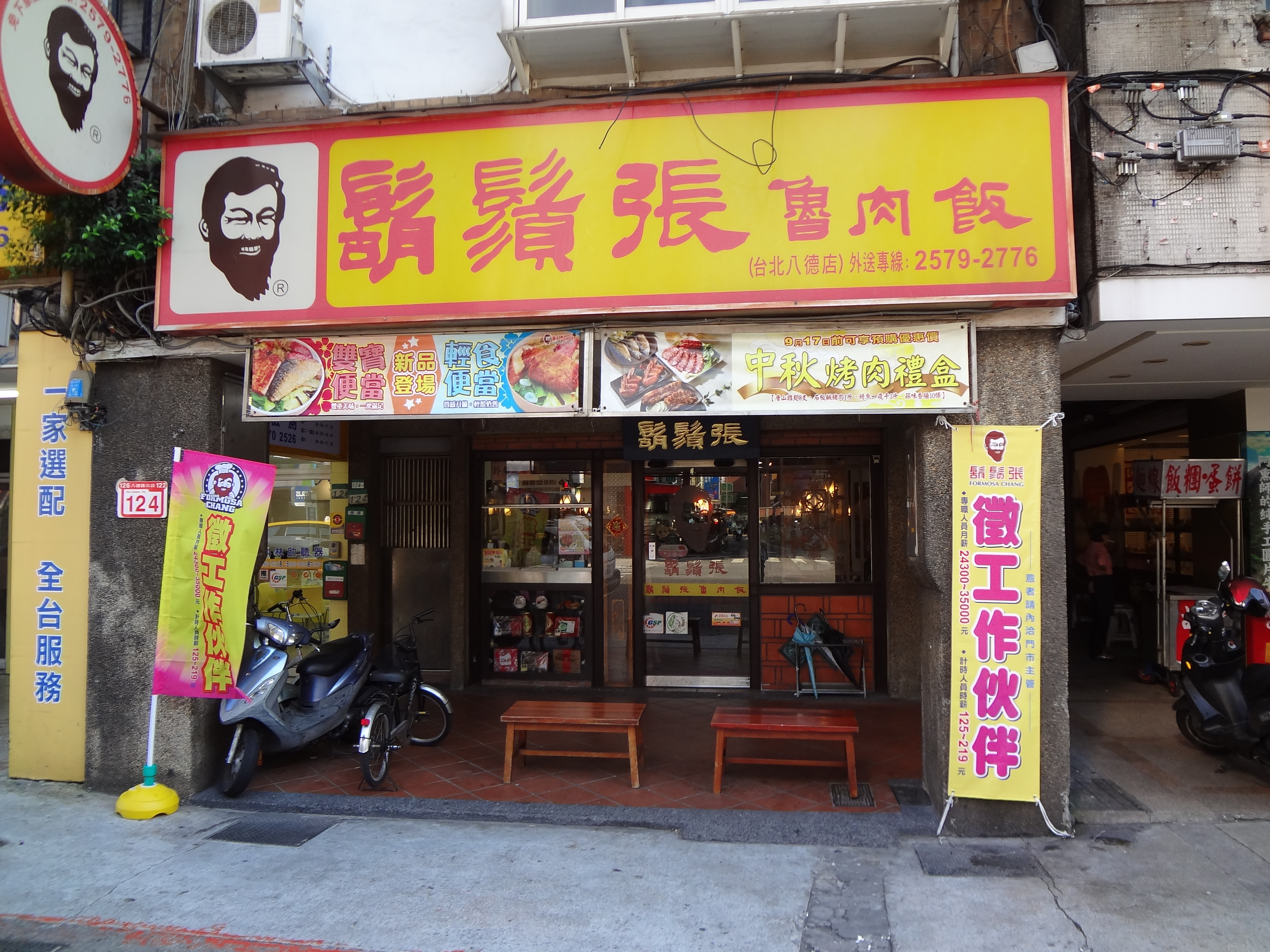
Formosa Chang branch on Bade Road in Taipei's Songshan District in 2015

Over the years, Formosa Chang has increased its prices multiple times. Some of the increases have prompted criticism from customers. In September 2012, the restaurant chain hiked the price of its braised pork rice item by 6.25%. The increase sparked a media backlash with publications criticizing the price hike. Every publication highlighted that Formosa Chang had raised its price the second time that year. Some publications said that its new price was higher than its competitors'. The publications said that competitors bore the increased costs of ingredients. Some publications questioned why the hike happened after the cost of vegetables had just decreased, while the cost of rice had not increased for three years. Some criticized Formosa Chang for decreasing its portion sizes. The commentator Liu Ka-shiang wrote an opinion piece calling braised pork rice a "national dish for the common people" that "poor families can afford with the least money, yet it fills them the most". He accused Formosa Zhang of forgetting their roots. Numerous media publications referenced his post which spread widely.

At the same time as the chairman, Chang Yung-chang, had participated in the Taipei city administration's initiative to boost the area's culinary scene, he had pledged to set the prices at an affordable level. In response to the price hike, the city planned to end its partnership with Formosa Chang to promote local dishes. The partnership with the city government was critical to the restaurant's brand image. After the mayor of Taipei, Hau Lung-pin, held a discussion with Chang, the restaurant announced it would withdraw the price hike. The restaurant said it "apologized for the public's feelings" and said it "started as a street vendor, and has always been dedicated to the preservation of snack culture". The researchers Wang Rui-xiang and Yao Hui-chung said that Formosa Chang was able to defuse the controversy through apologizing and undoing its price increase. According to the Economic Daily News, despite rising food and labor costs in 2018, restaurant operators were wary of raising prices, thinking, "Just look at the consequences of Formosa Chang's price increase."

Formosa Chang hiked prices of its minced pork rice three times in 2014 owing to increased ingredient expenses. The increase in prices February, March, and July resulted in some negative media coverage but the response was generally neutral. The researchers Wang and Yao said that the media had viewed the 2012 price increase as opportunistic, whereas the 2014 price increase was seen as having more justification since the cost of rice, meat, and vegetables had increased in the previous year. Whereas Formosa Chang had increased prices for numerous in 2012 regardless of the increase in ingredient costs, they took a more precise approach in 2014 and justified to the public why they were raising prices. When eggs, chicken, and vegetables cost more in February, they increased the lunchbox price. When pork costs increased in March, they increased the cost of pork dishes such as ribs. When pork, chicken, and rice cost more in July, the restaurant increased the price of its braised pork rice and chicken rice dishes. When Formosa Chang raised prices in 2014, Liu, the commentator, penned an opinion piece in the Apple Daily opposing the price hike. Yeh Kuang-shih, the Minister of Transportation and Communications, responded that when there is an excessive focus on keeping food costs low, restaurants are compelled to trim their budgets which causes supply chain and food safety issues.

In 2016, the restaurant raised prices on 22 dishes, citing the 50% rise in inspections expenses year over year and the increase in labor costs to recruit staff. Formosa Chang froze its prices in 2020 before raising them again in January 2023. The company increased the price of 23% of its menu selections by 5% in January 2023. It attributed the increase to the COVID-19 pandemic, increased labor costs, and the growing cost of raw materials. Two additional prices increases took place in 2024 in February and December owing to increased labor and food costs.

== Partnerships ==
Beginning in 2010, China Airlines served airline meals prepared by Formosa Chang including minced pork rice. Formosa Chang partnered with the convenience store chain Hi-Life in 2021 to create two types of baozi to sell in the store. The two products are the "golden cui lu bao" (Chinese: 黃金粹魯包) and the "golden bamboo shoot pork bao" (Chinese: 黃金筍肉包). The exterior skin of the bao is made by Song Baozhi (Chinese: 松包子), while the interior is stuffed with Formosa Chang's minced pork and bamboo sheets.

Formosa Chang partnered with the virtual restaurant Just Kitchen in 2021. The virtual restaurant's staff stopped by Formosa Chang numerous times to observe how to more accurately make the restaurant's classic minced pork rice dish.

== Reception ==
The Economic Daily News journalist Chen Nien-tzu in 1991 praised Formosa Chang's minced pork rice as "economical and delicious". The authors Josh Ku, Trigg Brown, and Cathy Erway praised the restaurant as being "high on our fast-food restaurant favorites", calling its fare "done well" and "delicious". David Chen of the Taipei Times in 2011 said that Formosa Chang's food was "consistent" and a healthier option compared to a meal of a Big Mac and French fries. He said that although the chain is missing a street stand's "down-home feel", it is a dependable and trustworthy choice for diners pressed for time.

== Works cited ==
- Wang, Rui-xiang 汪睿祥; Yao, Hui-chung 姚惠忠 (2018). "議題回應與危機訊號：鬍鬚張漲價媒體議題分析" [Issue Responses and Crisis Signals: Analyses of Media Issues on Formosa Chang Chain Restaurant Raising Prices]. 管理學報 管理學報 [Journal of Management and Business Research] (in Chinese). 35 (2): 137–157. doi:10.6504/JMBR.201806_35(2).0001. ISSN 2521-4306. EBSCOhost 130508759.
