= Lu rou =

Chinese braised meat dish

滷肉
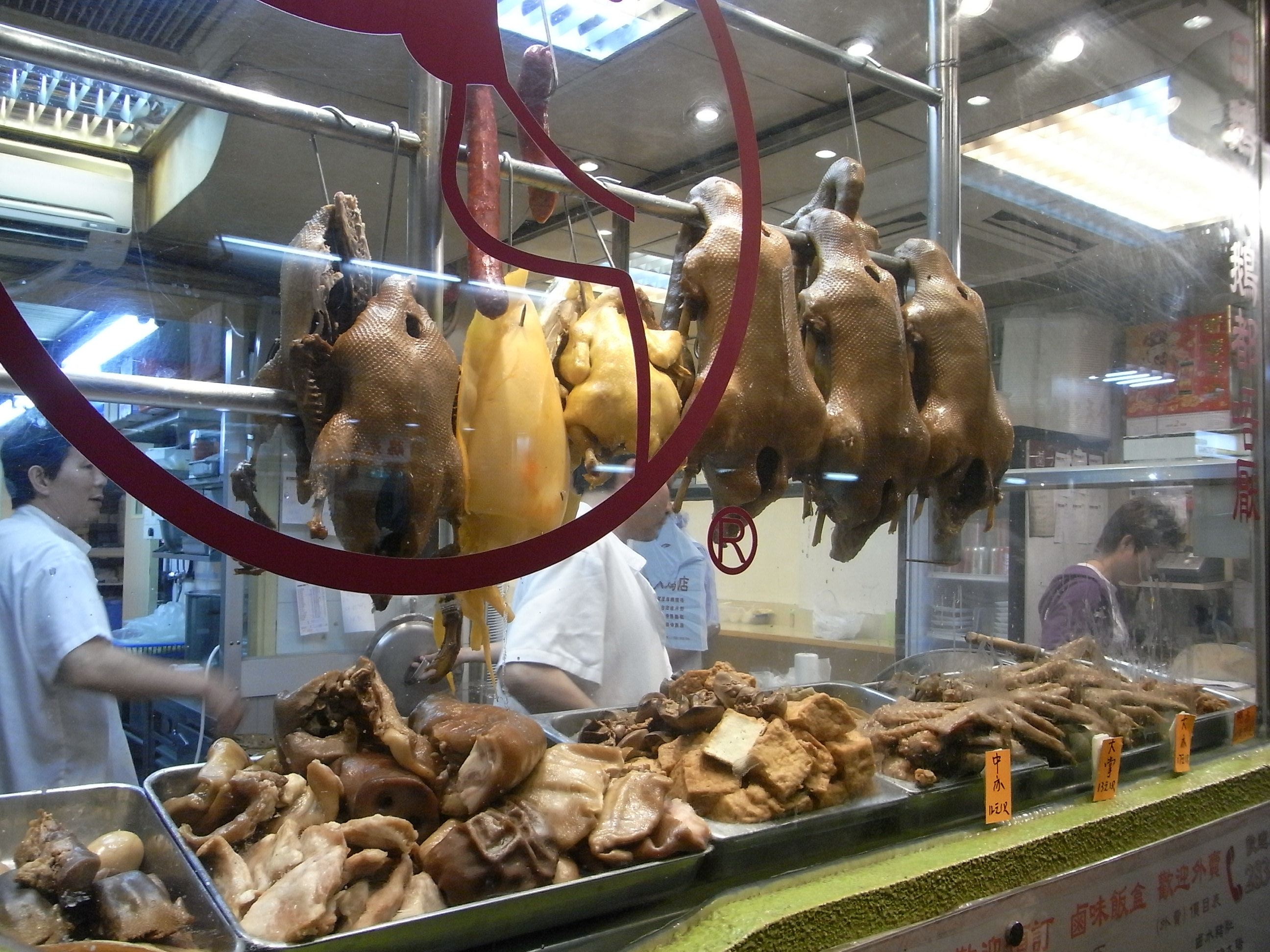
- A shop selling Teochew-style lu rou
- Alternative names: Lu rou
- Region or state: China
- Main ingredients: Pork belly, dark soy sauce, rice wine, rock sugar, water
- Ingredients generally used: Shallots, garlic, ginger, scallions

Lu rou (traditional Chinese: 滷肉; simplified Chinese: 卤肉; pinyin: lǔròu) is a regional Chinese meat dish made via braising with master stock, often made with pork. In Southern Taiwan, the dish is called bah-sò (肉燥), its Hokkien name. Notable variations of this dish include Teochew lo mei, Thai khao kha mu, Taiwanese Ló͘-bah-pn̄g, and Fujianese braised pork rice.

== Cooking method ==
The basic ingredients of lu rou consist of pork belly and dark soy sauce, and the dish is finished by adding various spices. There is not a specific set of standard spices for the dish, although commonly found are sichuan pepper, star anise, chenpi, cinnamon, licorice root, tsao-ko, ginger, shajiang, galangal, scallions, and rock sugar. Chili peppers may also be added in a Sichuan-style variation of the dish. Lu rou is generally regarded as not a difficult dish to make, as all it requires is cooking pork, dark soy sauce, and spices (or a Chinese spice braising packet known as lu bao instead).

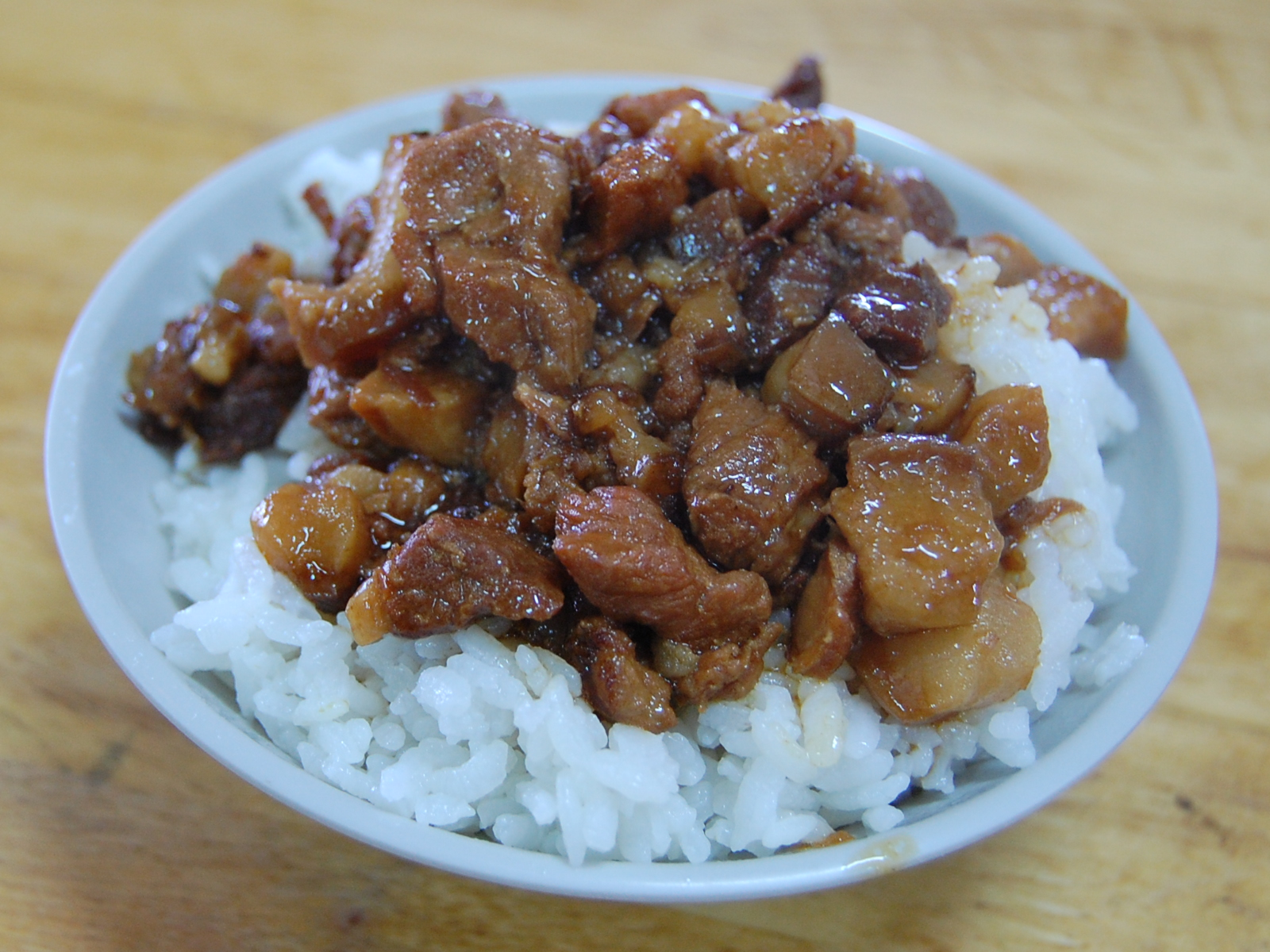
A bowl of Ló͘-bah-pn̄g, a Taiwanese dish consisting of rice topped with lu rou
