= HTY =

HTY may refer to:

- Hatay Airport, Turkey (IATA:HTY)
- Hattersley railway station, England
- Henty railway station, Australia
- Hsin Tung Yang, a Taiwanese retailer of preserved meats
