= 2012 Hsinchu karaoke bar fire =

Arson attack in Taiwan

- Location: East District, Hsinchu City
- Date: March 12, 2012
- Attack type: Arson
- Deaths: 5
- Injuries: 4
- Perpetrator: Peng Jianyuan

On March 12, 2012, in East District, Hsinchu City, Taiwan, 34-year-old Peng Jianyuan set a fire in a karaoke bar, resulting in five deaths and four injuries. Peng was dissatisfied that his close friend Zhou Zhiqiang (also aged 34 at the time) refused to stand up for him. Peng therefore purchased NT$300 worth of gasoline and set fire to Zhou's KTV, located on Minghu Road, Hsinchu City.

On September 2, 2014, the Supreme Court of the Republic of China (Taiwan) sentenced Peng to death, with the verdict finalized. Peng was detained at the Tucheng Detention Center in New Taipei City, awaiting execution by firing squad.

In 2024, the Constitutional Court accepted a petition for constitutional interpretation regarding the death penalty submitted by Peng Jianyuan and 37 other death row inmates.

== Peng Jianyuan ==
After completing military service, Peng associated with heavy drug users. He had a criminal record including drug offenses, unlawful detention, and domestic violence.

== Course of the crime ==
In the early morning of March 12, 2012, in Hsinchu City, Peng Jianyuan became dissatisfied that his close friend Zhou Zhiqiang refused to assist him. Accompanied by a woman surnamed Wang, Peng drove to a gas station and purchased 10 liters of gasoline, then went to Zhou's KTV on Minghu Road. When Zhou opened the door, Peng splashed gasoline and ignited the fire, using the metal container holding the gasoline to block the small entrance, preventing escape. Three people inside were able to escape through a safety exit.

After the arson, Peng behaved suspiciously and was intercepted by a police patrol network. He was subsequently escorted to a hospital under guard. Following investigation, police identified Peng as a suspect. After questioning, he was transferred to the Hsinchu District Prosecutors Office on charges of murder and public endangerment, and his detention was approved by the court.

== Casualties ==
The five deceased victims were Tian Dezhen (33, male), Qiu Wenfu (32, male), Xu Zongyong (42, male), Lin Meijing (46, female), and Yan Guifen (42, female). Qiu Wenfu was the owner of the well-known Hsinchu Chenghuang Temple eatery Afu Braised Pork Rice.

The four injured individuals were Zhou Zhiqiang (34, male), the property owner, who suffered burns to all limbs; Zhou Yurong (26, female, seven months pregnant), who suffered smoke inhalation; Xu Yuzhen (37, female), who also suffered smoke inhalation; and Peng Jianyuan (34, male), the arson suspect, who sustained burns to both hands.

== Indictment and trial ==
On June 6, 2012, after being taken into custody, Peng showed concern only for whether he met the criteria for voluntary surrender and displayed no remorse whatsoever for his crimes. Prosecutors at the Hsinchu District Prosecutors Office considered Peng's actions to be extremely malicious and believed that he needed to be permanently isolated from society, and therefore specifically sought the death penalty.

On November 28, the Hsinchu District Court ruled that Peng was not eligible for sentence reduction based on voluntary surrender, and in the first-instance judgment, sentenced him to death for intentional homicide and homicide with indeterminate intent, and deprived him of civil rights for life.

On December 12, Peng's friend Zhou Zhiqiang was indicted for negligent homicide in the course of business and violations of the Building Act, due to operating the karaoke business illegally in a tin structure and failing to provide adequate safety equipment, resulting in the deaths of five people.

On May 9, 2013, the Taiwan High Court dismissed the appeal and upheld the death sentence in the second-instance trial.

On December 12, the Supreme Court found the evidence insufficient and remanded the case to the High Court for retrial.

On March 11, 2014, the High Court, in the first retrial, again upheld the death sentence, with the judges concluding that Peng's crimes were extremely serious and that he was beyond rehabilitation.

On September 2, the Supreme Court, in the third-instance trial, finalized the death sentence for Peng Jianyuan. He is currently detained at the Taipei Detention Center, awaiting execution by firing squad.

=== Divergent views ===
Peng Jianyuan had a medical history of mental illness, and throughout all stages of trial, the charge applied was “homicide with indeterminate intent.”

According to interpretations of the International Covenants on Human Rights (the “Two Covenants”) by the Supreme Court in cases such as the Chen Kunming murder case and the Lin Jixiong arson case that killed 13 people, individuals with mental disorders should not be sentenced to death, and non-premeditated homicide should not carry the death penalty.

In response, Lin Xinyi, executive director of the Taiwan Alliance to End the Death Penalty, stated that the Supreme Court has issued inconsistent opinions on whether defendants with mental disorders may be sentenced to death. The Supreme Court responded by clarifying that it had already provided clear legal interpretations, and that the reasoning and main holdings of its judgments were explicitly stated and appropriate.

Lai Zhongxing, presiding judge of the Fourth Criminal Division of the Supreme Court, along with four other judges, held that the prohibition against sentencing or executing individuals with mental or intellectual disabilities to death was intended merely to “urge” compliance, rather than constituting a mandatory requirement under the Two Covenants, and therefore did not possess the force of domestic law.

Gao Rongzhi, executive director of the Judicial Reform Foundation, argued that the Supreme Court, in order to cater to public sentiment favoring the death penalty, convened a life-and-death debate and subsequently hollowed out the Two Covenants, producing a rationalized legal interpretation to justify sentencing Peng to death.

In 2024, the Constitutional Court accepted the petition for constitutional interpretation regarding the death penalty submitted by Peng Jianyuan and 37 other death row inmates.
