= Chūkadon =

Japanese dish

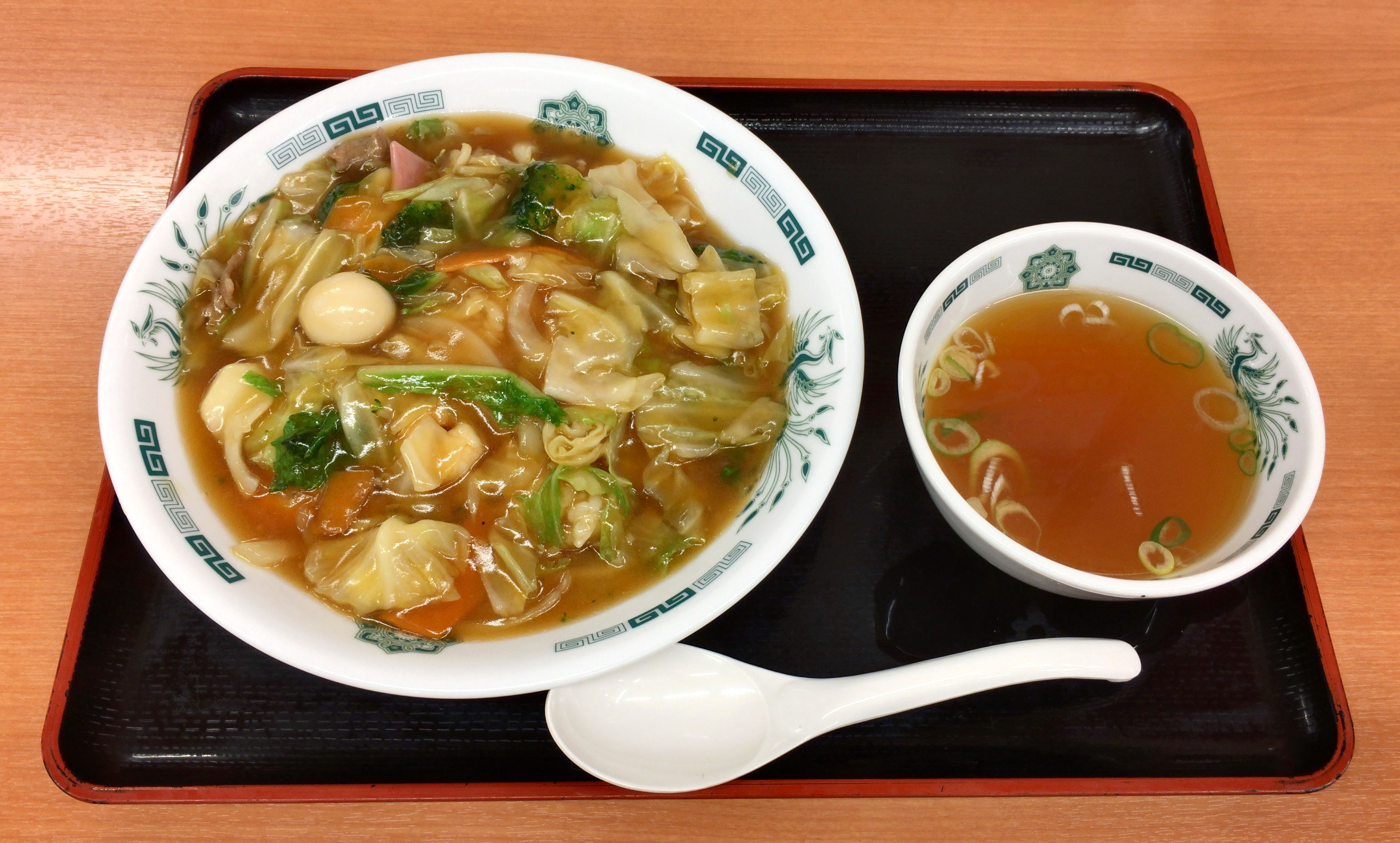
Chūkadon

Chūkadon (中華丼) is a Japanese fast-food dish. It consists of a bowl of rice with stir-fried vegetables, onions, mushrooms, and thin slices of meat on top. Literally meaning "Chinese rice bowl", it is inspired by Chinese cuisine. It is a kind of donburi.
