= Ló͘-bah-pn̄g =

Minced pork rice dish of China and Taiwan

Ló͘-bah-pn̄g (Minced pork rice)
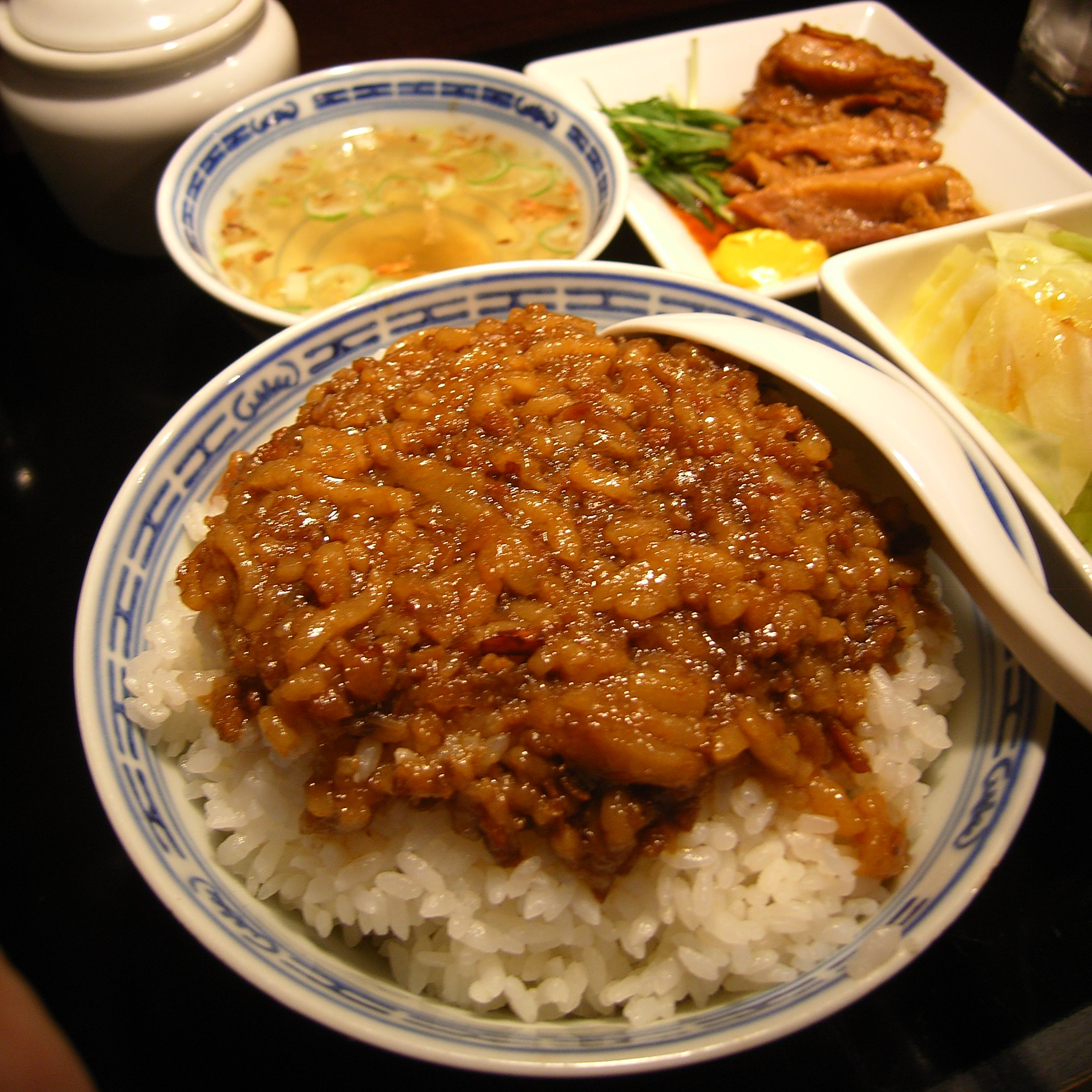
- Minced pork rice with other common Taiwanese dishes
- Place of origin: Taiwan
- Region or state: Taiwan
- Main ingredients: ground pork, rice

Ló͘-bah-pn̄g
- Traditional Chinese: 滷肉飯
- Simplified Chinese: 卤肉饭
- Literal meaning: braised meat rice
Transcriptions
Standard Mandarin
- Hanyu Pinyin: lǔròufàn
- Wade–Giles: lu^{3}-jou^{4}-fan^{4}
Southern Min
- Hokkien POJ: ló͘-bah-pn̄g
- Tâi-lô: lóo-bah-pn̄g

Ló͘-bah-pn̄g, also called bah-sò-pn̄g or Lou-rou-fan in southern Taiwan, or translated to minced pork rice in English, is a rice dish that is commonly seen throughout Taiwan and Southern Fujian, China. The flavor may vary from one region to another, but the basic ingredients remain the same: lu rou pork marinated and boiled in soy sauce served on top of steamed rice. It is a type of gaifan dish.

== Etymology ==
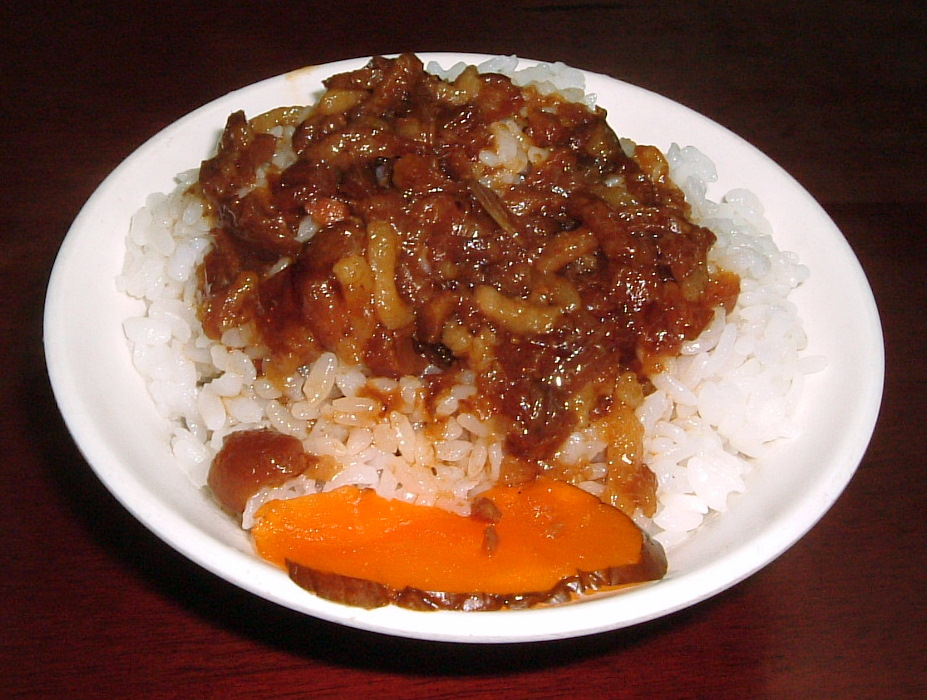
Minced pork rice served with pickles

滷肉飯 has the direct meaning of "rice with braised meat." However, for several decades, many Taiwanese people have used the homophone "魯" instead of "滷". Although people still use the original character in China, "魯肉飯" has become the most common name seen in Taiwanese restaurants and street vendors. 魯 is the ancient name for the Chinese province of Shandong, which led the Taiwan edition of the Michelin Green Guide to write in April 2011 that minced pork rice originated in Shandong. In response, the Taipei City Government held a press conference requesting a revision to the Michelin guidebook to specify that it was a Taiwanese dish.

== Preparation ==
As the origin of the flavor, the sauce is the key to making minced pork rice. The most popular way of preparation seen in Taiwan is stir-frying the pork belly with sliced shallot in oil, and then boiling it in soy sauce. In the frying process, one may customize the flavor by adding seasonings such as sugar, rice wine, pepper and other spices. When finished, the dark-brown meat sauce is called bah-sò (肉燥) in Southern Taiwan and lu rou (滷肉) in North and Central Taiwan, and is also served with noodles, soup, vegetables and many homemade Taiwanese dishes.

== Regional varieties ==
While minced pork rice is an important icon in typical Taiwanese folk cuisine, the variety of methods to customize flavors is so wide that it creates considerable differences between regions. In southern Taiwan, where people name it by the sauce "bah-sò-pn̄g (肉燥飯)" instead of the meat, minced pork rice is preferably served with pork with less fat. People in the north of Taiwan favor a greasier version of meat sauce with rice, sometimes even with glutinous rice mixed in.

In southern Taiwan, while "bah-sò-pn̄g" is seen on the menu indicating minced pork rice, "ló͘-bah-pn̄g (滷肉飯)" remains on the very same menu, referring to another dish where braised pork belly covers the rice. The same rice with braised pork belly is known as "khòng-bah-pn̄g (焢肉飯)" in northern Taiwan.

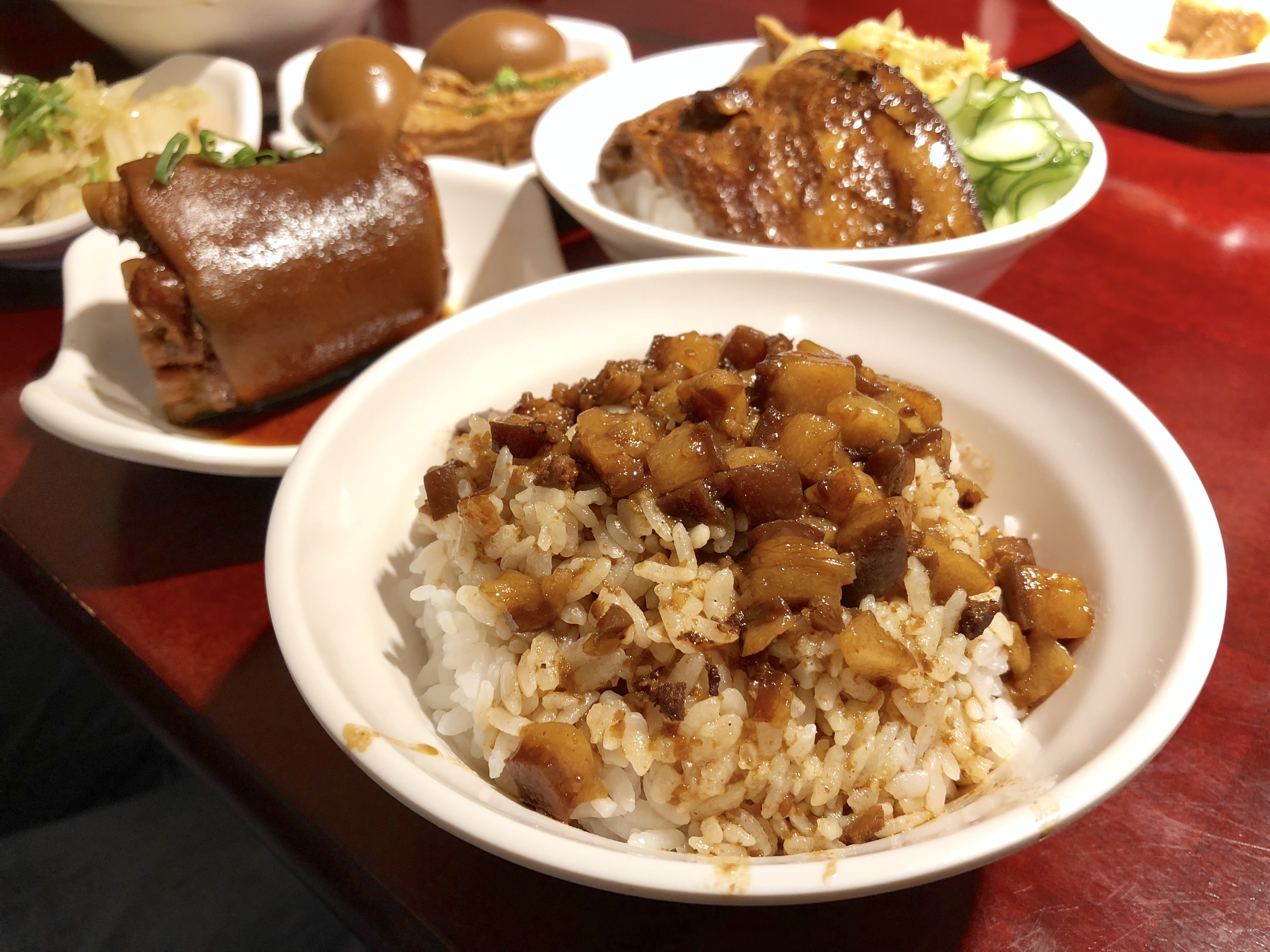

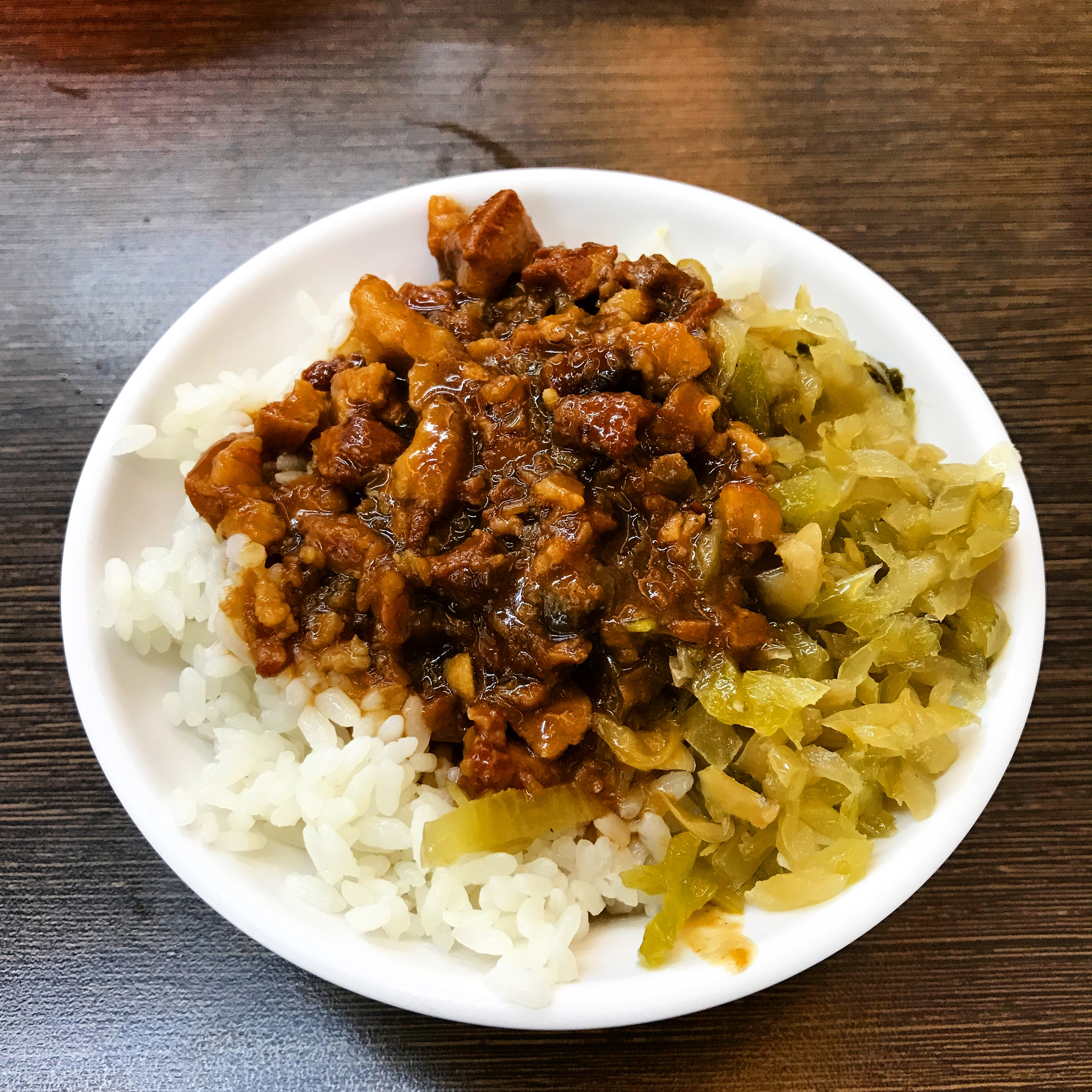

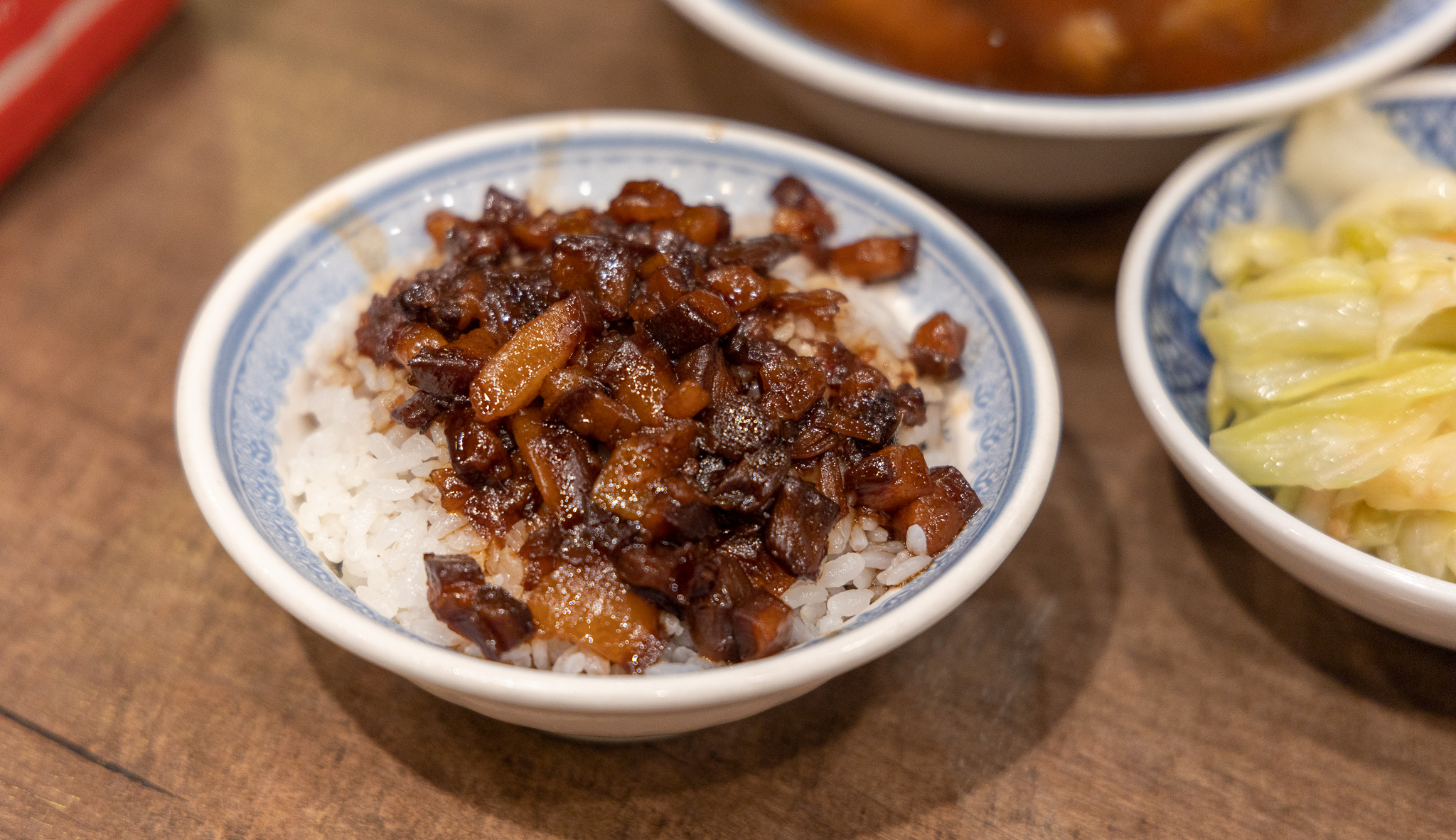

== See also ==
- List of pork dishes
- Taiwanese cuisine
