= Ningxia Night Market =

Night market in Taipei, Taiwan

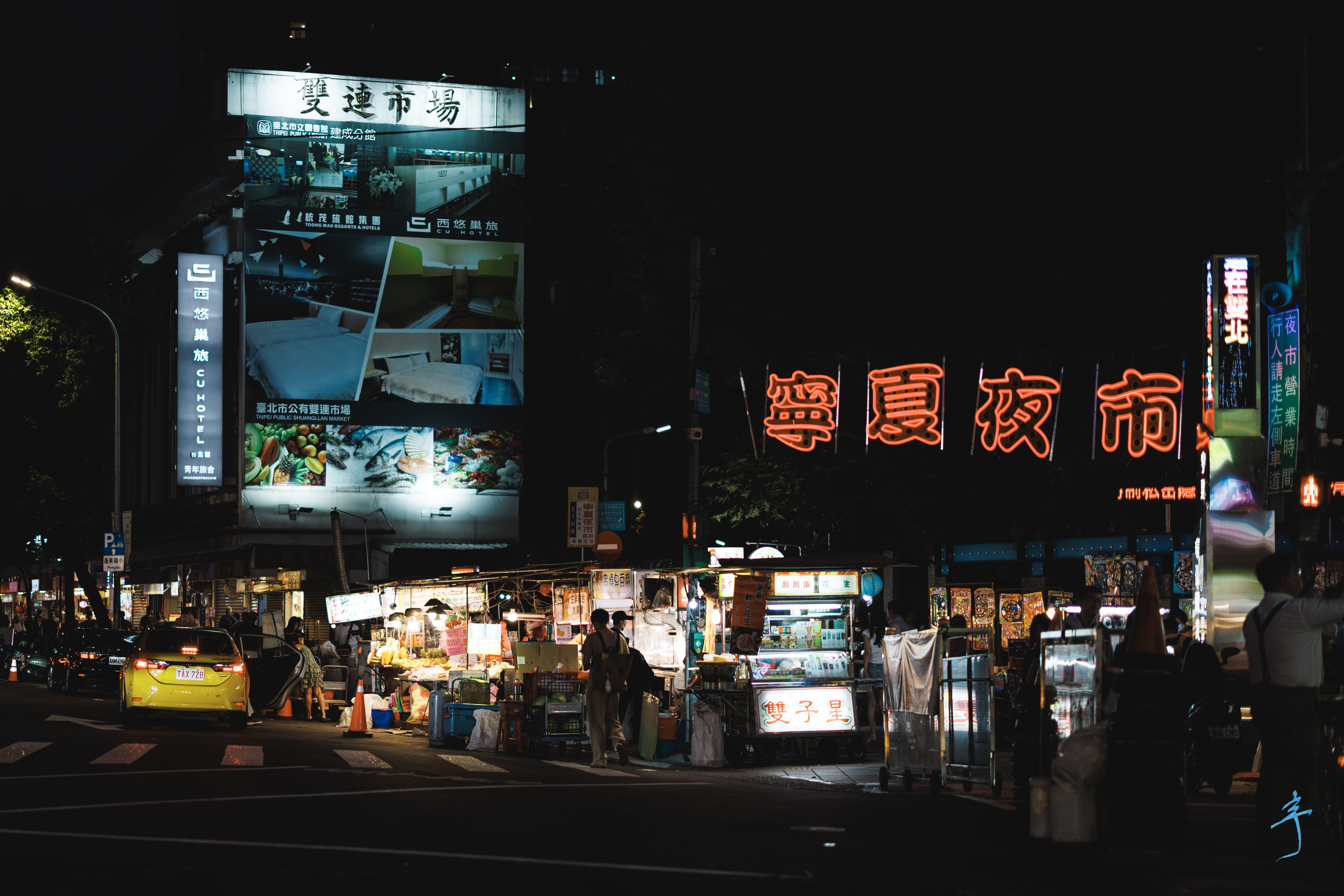
- Sign of Ningxia Night Market
- Interactive map of Ningxia Night Market
- Location: Taipei, Taiwan
- Type: Night market

Ningxia Night Market (Chinese: 寧夏夜市) is a night market in Taipei, Taiwan.

The vendor Yuan Huan Pien Oyster Egg Omelette has been recognized by the Michelin Guide.

== See also ==
- Datong District, Taipei
- List of night markets in Taiwan
- List of tourist attractions in Taipei
- Night markets in Taiwan
