= Gaifan =

Chinese dishes based on a rice bowl

- Traditional Chinese: 蓋飯
- Simplified Chinese: 盖饭
- Literal meaning: topped rice
Transcriptions
Standard Mandarin
- Hanyu Pinyin: gàifàn
- Wade–Giles: kai4-fan4

gaijiaofan
- Traditional Chinese: 蓋澆飯
- Simplified Chinese: 盖浇饭
- Literal meaning: topping on rice
Transcriptions
Standard Mandarin
- Hanyu Pinyin: gàijiāofàn
- Wade–Giles: kai4-chiao1-fan4

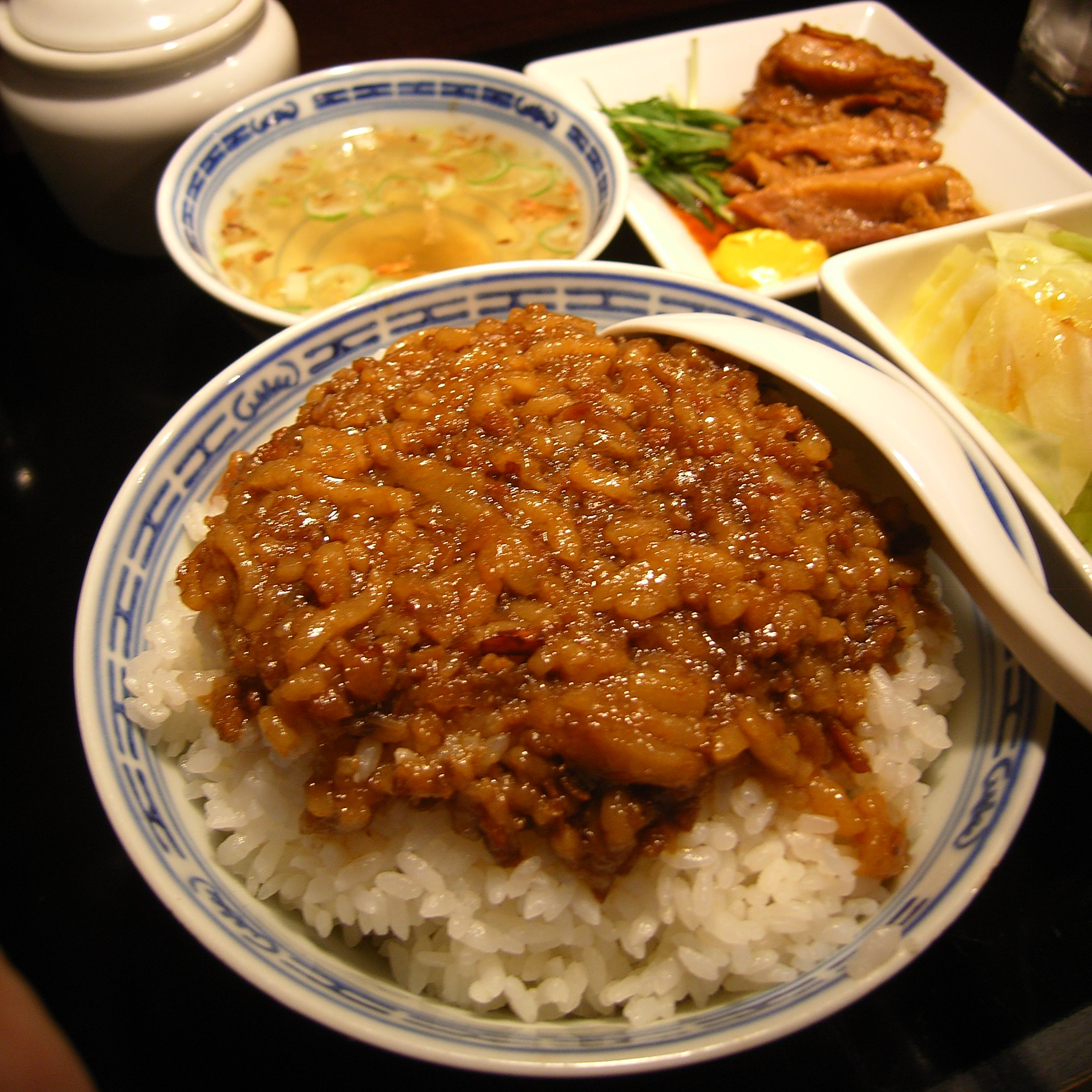
Minced pork rice

Gaifan (simplified Chinese: 盖饭; traditional Chinese: 蓋飯; lit. 'topped rice') or gaijiaofan (蓋澆飯; 盖浇饭; 'topping on rice') is a type of dish in Chinese cuisine typically offered in low-cost establishments. It consists of a fish, meat, or vegetable topping served over rice. The dish can be either freshly cooked or previously cooked, such as char siu. According to the Commentary to the Classic of Rites, gaifan can be dated back to Western Zhou. Throughout the Tang dynasty, gaifan was served during the banquets of newly promoted officials.

== Gallery ==
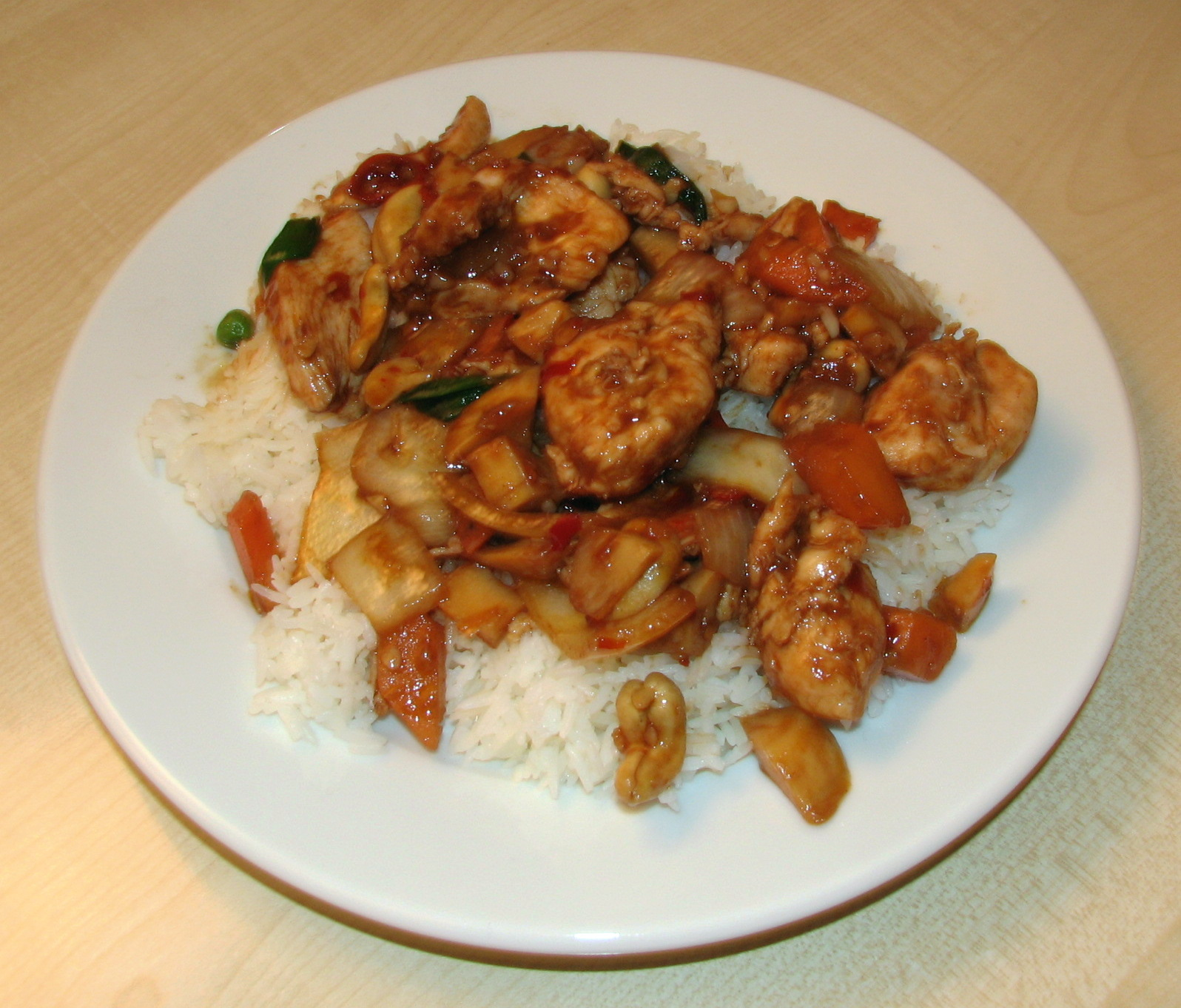
Kung Pao chicken gaifan

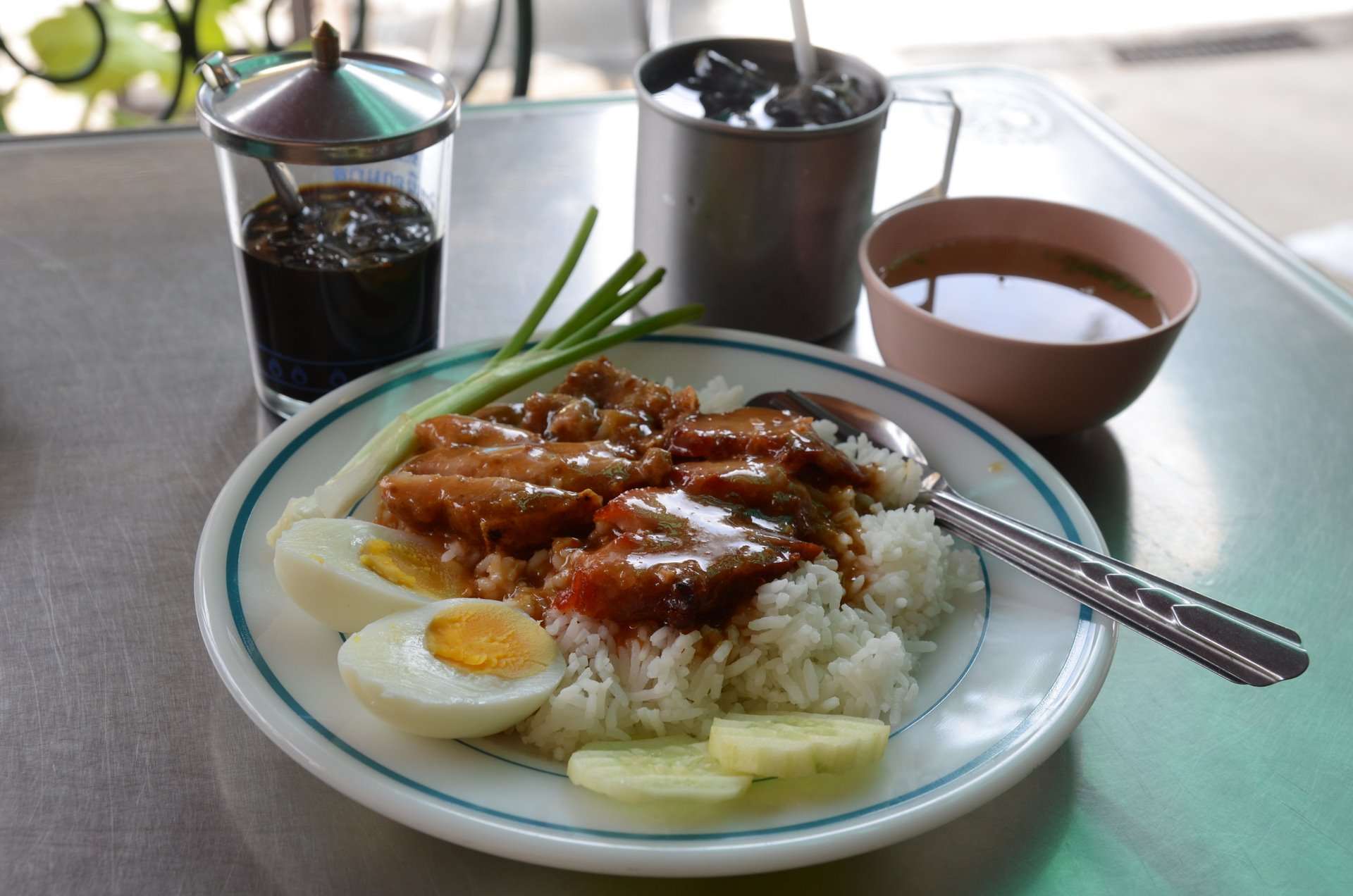
Thai-Chinese char siu gaifan

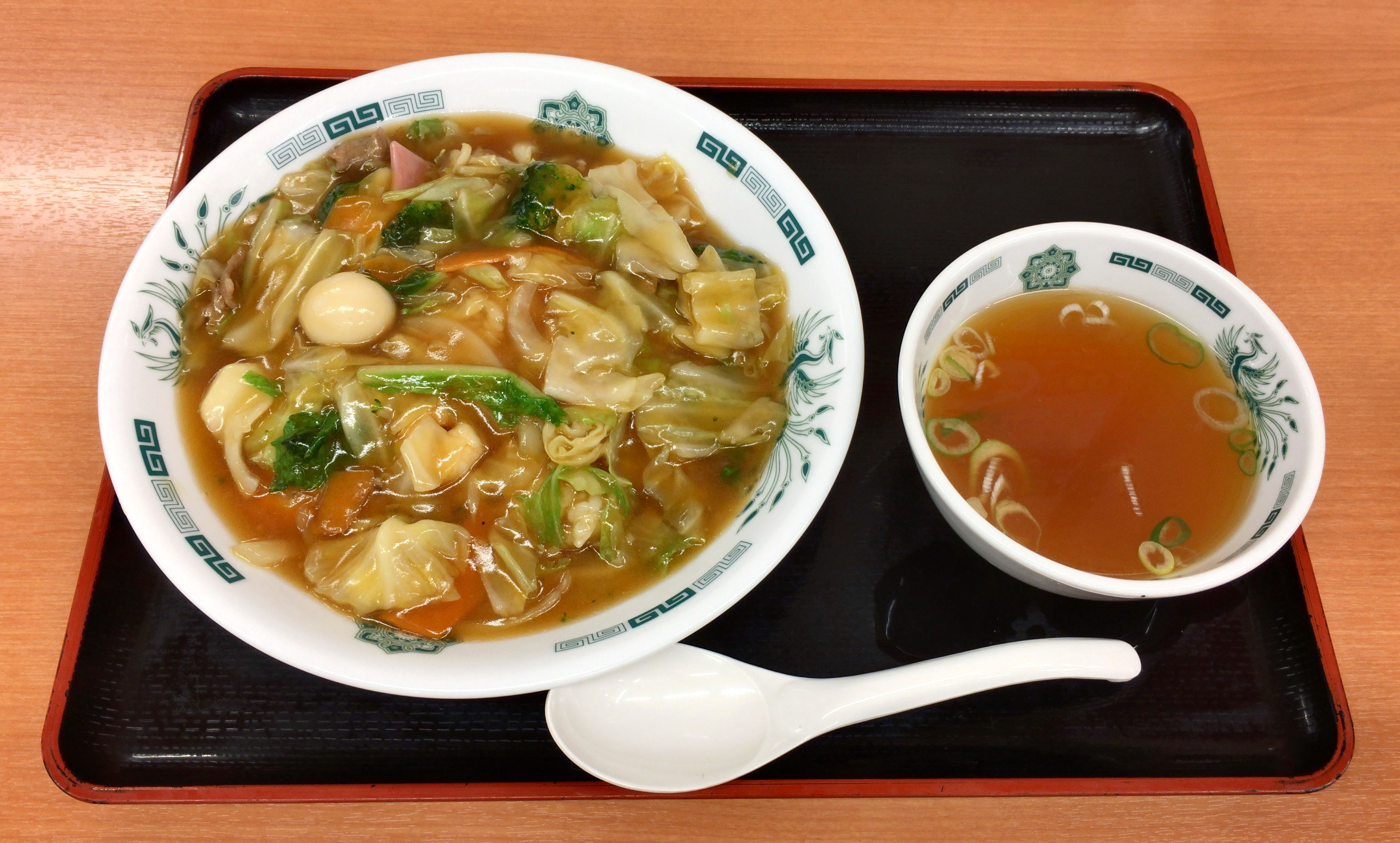
Chūkadon

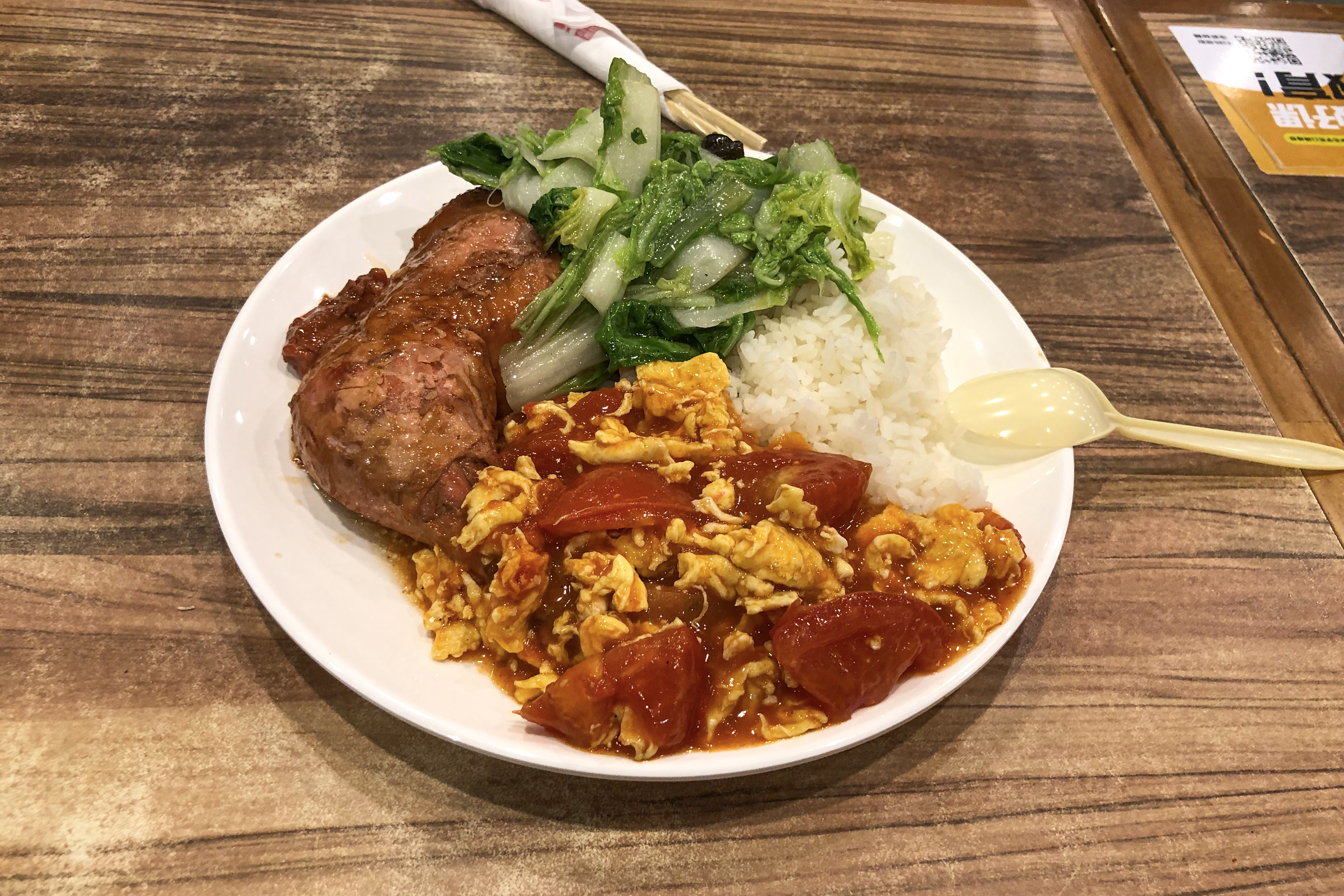
A serving of gaifan with three toppings sold from a food court in Beijing, China

== See also ==
- Donburi, usually called "Japanese gaifan" in China.
- Economy rice
