= Braised pork rice =

Traditional Taiwanese pork dish

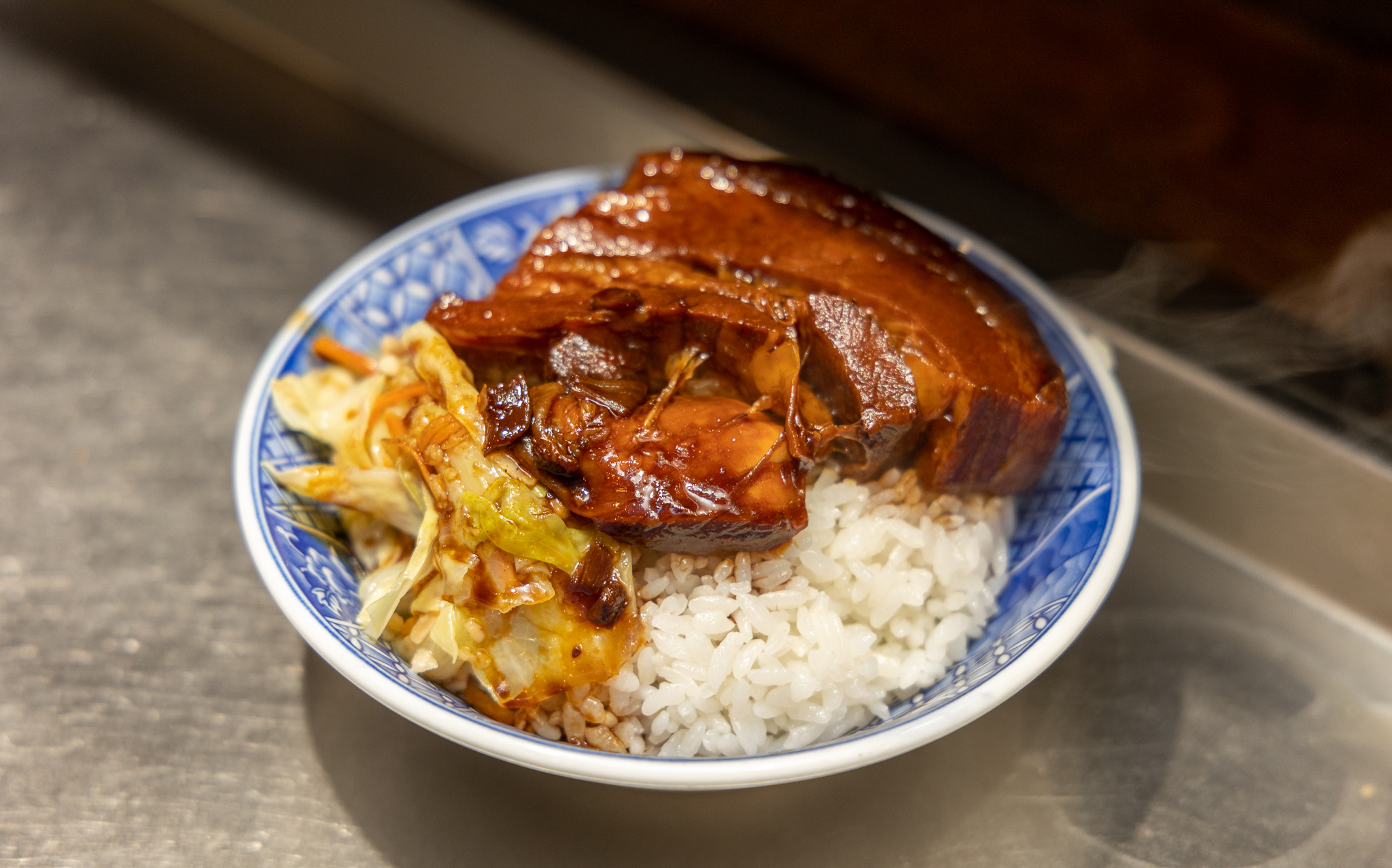
- Pork belly rice
- Alternative names: Braised pork rice
- Place of origin: Fujian, China
- Serving temperature: Hot
- Main ingredients: Rice, pork, fermented bamboo shoots, egg

Braised pork rice
- Traditional Chinese: 炕肉飯
- Simplified Chinese: 炕肉饭
Transcriptions
Standard Mandarin
- Hanyu Pinyin: kòngròufàn
Hakka
- Romanization: kongˇ ngiug fan˖
Southern Min
- Hokkien POJ: khòng-bah-pn̄g

Braised pork rice (Taiwanese: khòng-bah-pn̄g, Chinese: 焢肉飯, 爌肉飯) is a gaifan dish found in Fujianese cuisine and Taiwanese cuisine. Although subject to regional variations, dishes are typically made of pork belly cooked in a process known as lǔ 滷 (boiled and marinated in soy sauce and sugar) and served on top of rice. Chinese pickles are often eaten with the dish.

Braised pork belly likely originated from Quanzhou, China, and was brought to Taiwan by immigrants during the Qing Dynasty. Along with the similar ló͘-bah-pn̄g (minced pork rice), khong bah png gradually became an integral part of Taiwanese xiaochi culture, commonly found at food stalls or bento stores. Similar dishes can be found within Hakka cuisine, Singaporean, and Malaysian cuisine. Braised pork rice is one of the most notable Taiwanese foods. Braised pork rice is a popular comfort food in Taiwan, with many street vendors and night markets offering their own secret recipes and variations.

== Etymology ==
Although "焢" and "爌" are both variant characters, the two are more commonly used in the name of the dish than "炕", except in Taiwan. Additionally, even though all three characters each have different pronunciations in Mandarin Chinese, the Taiwanese Hokkien pronunciation khòng is colloquially used in place. Therefore, the dish is commonly referred to as kòngròufàn in Mandarin.

In southern Taiwan, braised pork rice is referred to as ló͘-bah-pn̄g (Chinese: 滷肉飯; pinyin: lǔròufàn), which in northern and central Taiwan refers to minced pork rice. Minced pork rice is instead named bah-sò-pn̄g (Chinese: 肉燥飯) in the south.

== Braised pork rice in Changhua ==
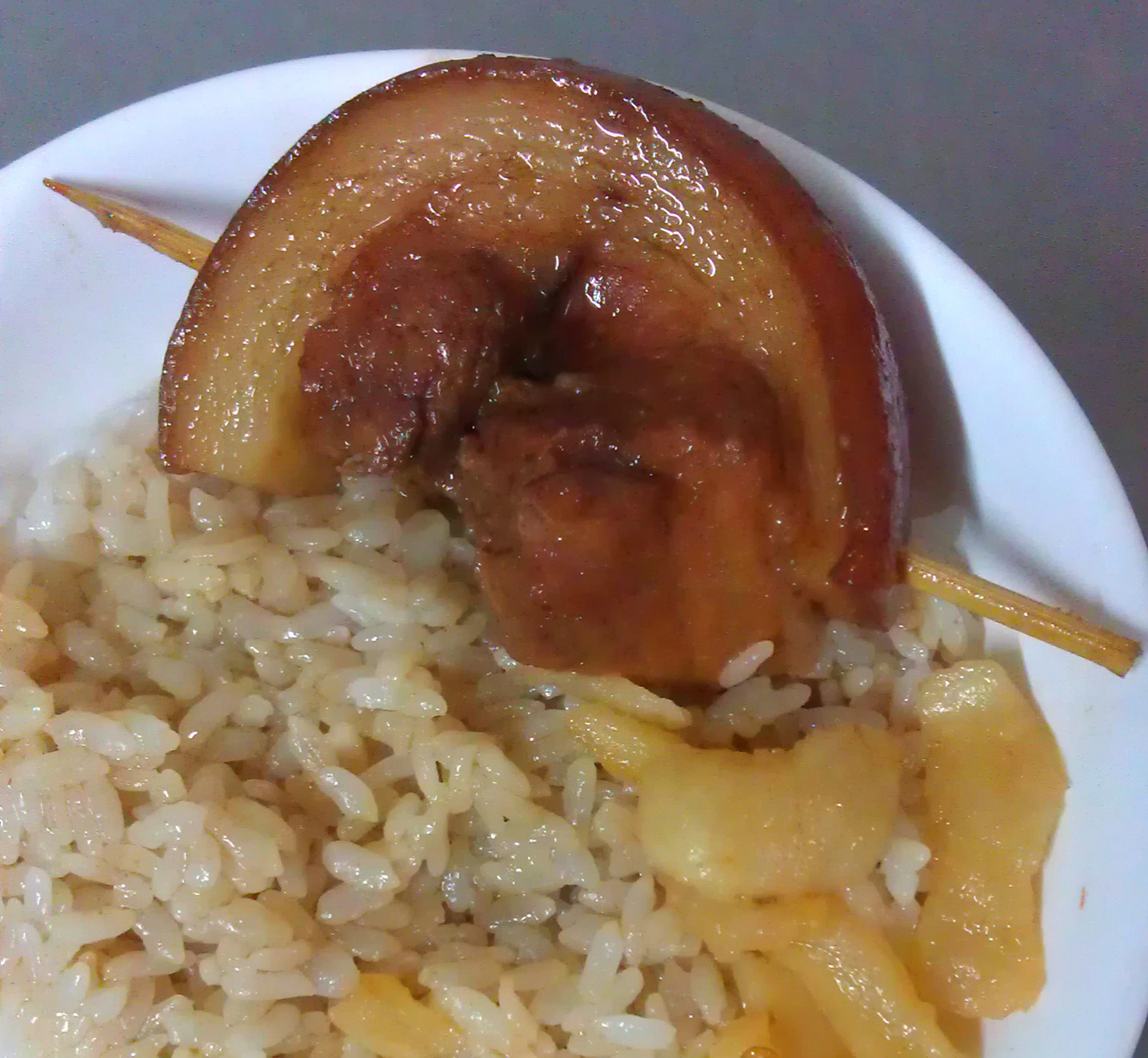
A bowl of braised pork rice from Changhua. Note the toothpick connecting the lean meat and fat.

Braised pork rice is one of the three essential dishes in Changhua cuisine, along with bah-oân and cat-mouse noodles (similar to tàⁿ-á-mī). The main difference is that rear leg pork is chosen instead of pork belly. Since the fat and lean meat from this cut often separates during preparation, vendors usually connect the two with a toothpick. The dish is eaten throughout the day, even including breakfast and siu yeh.

In 2011, Changhua hosted a braised pork rice festival. Eighteen local vendors were invited to serve the dish, and the event was visited by President Ma Ying-jeou. In 2012, Changhua set the Guinness World Record for the largest braised pork rice at 647 kilograms (1,426 lb).

== Gallery ==
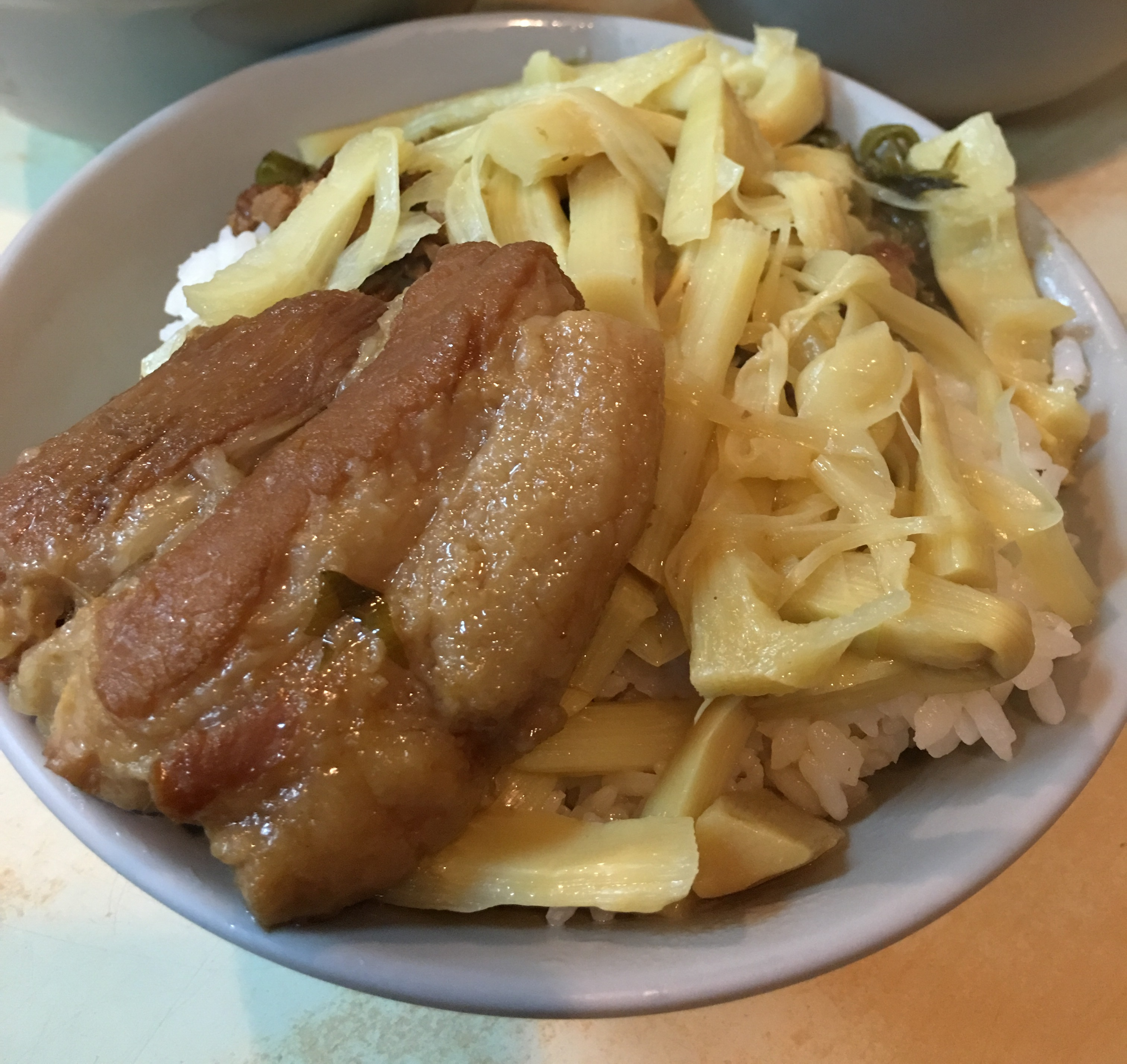
With fermented bamboo shoots

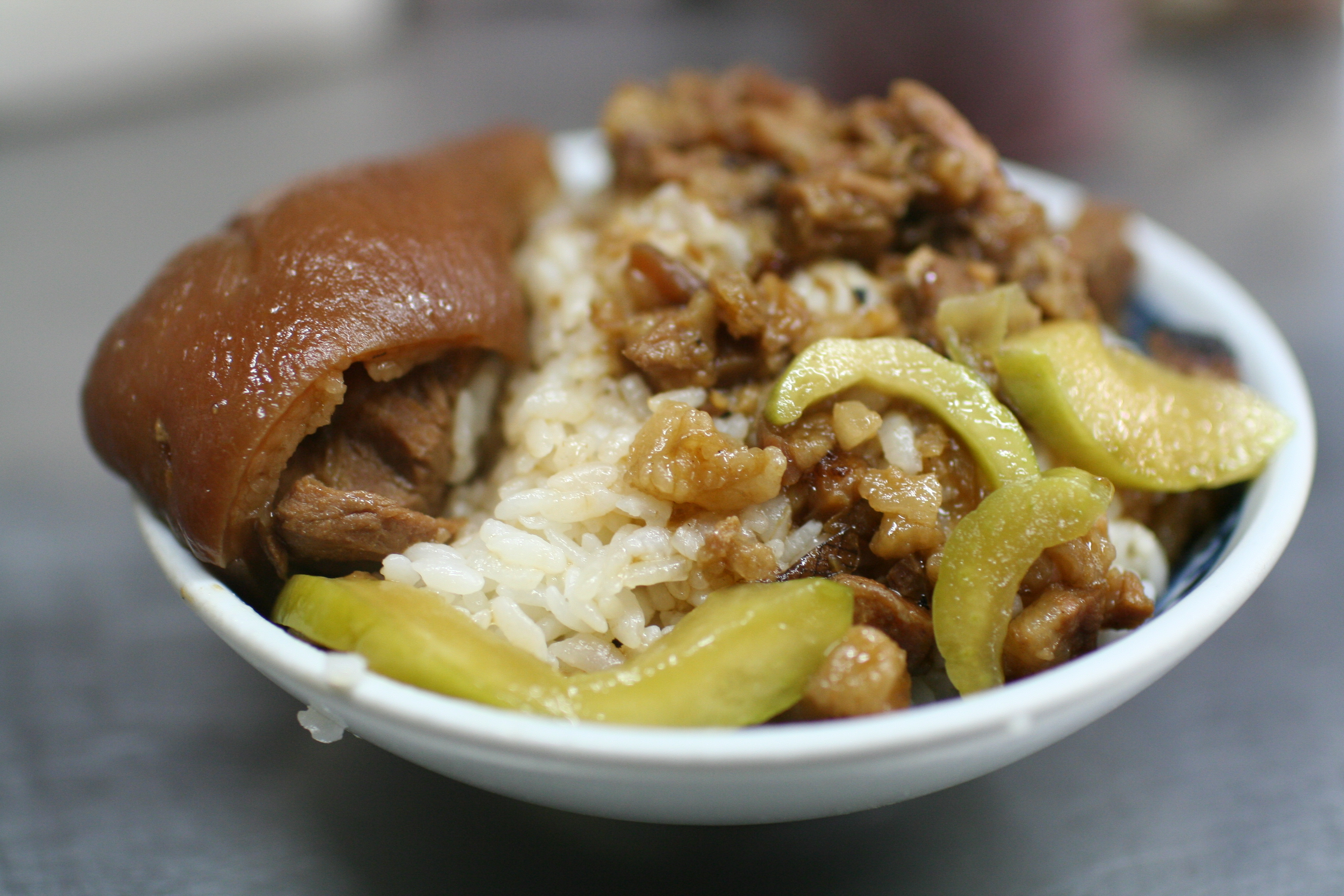
Braised pork rice from Taichung, with bitter melon

== See also ==
- List of pork dishes
- Humba
