= Khao kha mu =

Thai dish of stewed pork over rice

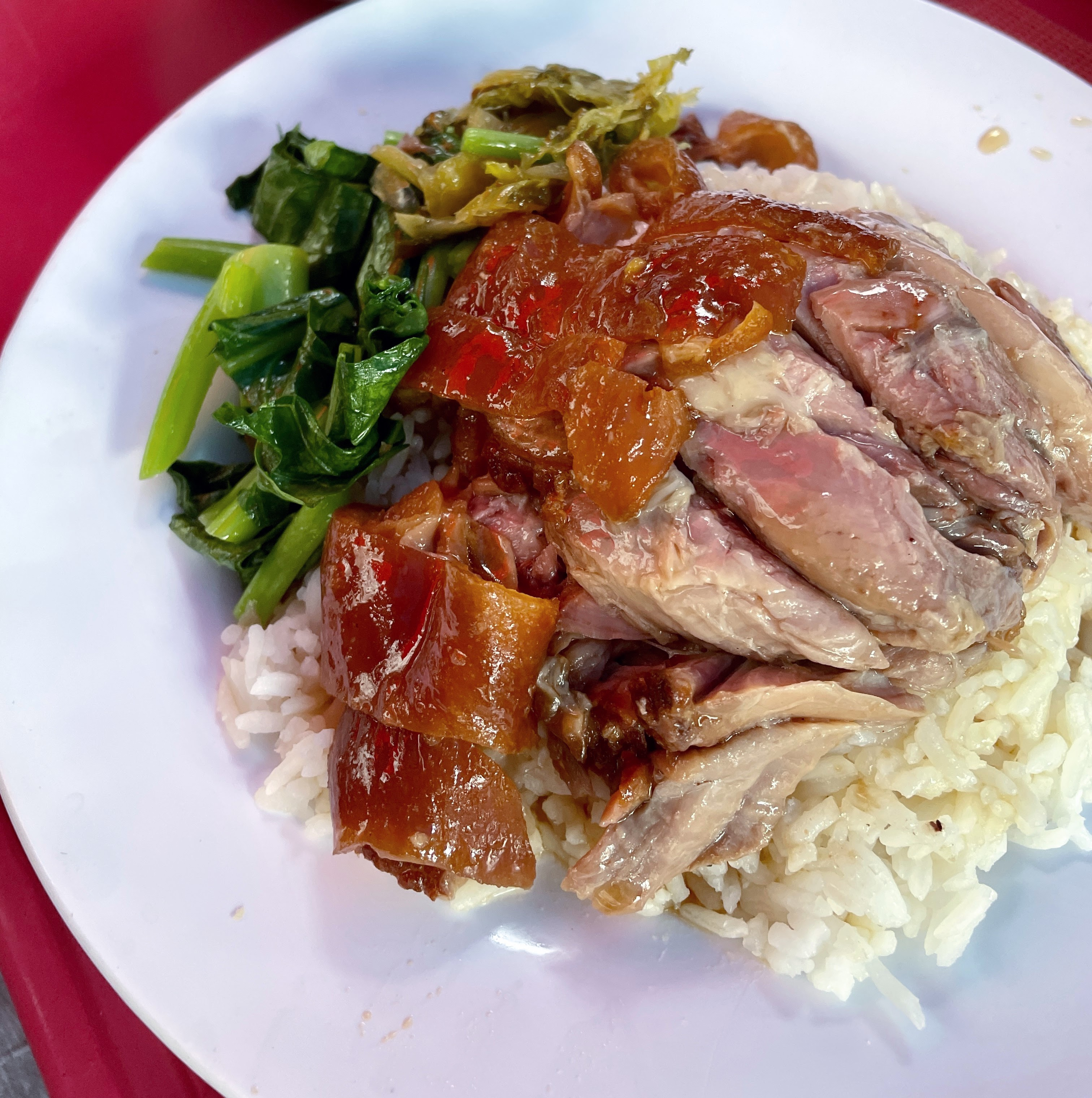
- Alternative names: Kha mu, kha mu phalo
- Type: Rice dish
- Course: Main course
- Place of origin: Thailand
- Region or state: Southeast Asia
- Created by: Thai Chinese
- Serving temperature: Hot
- Main ingredients: pork knuckles, steamed rice, half spiced corned egg, lettuce pickles, blanched kale, fresh bird's eye chili peppers, garlic with dipping sour and spicy sauce

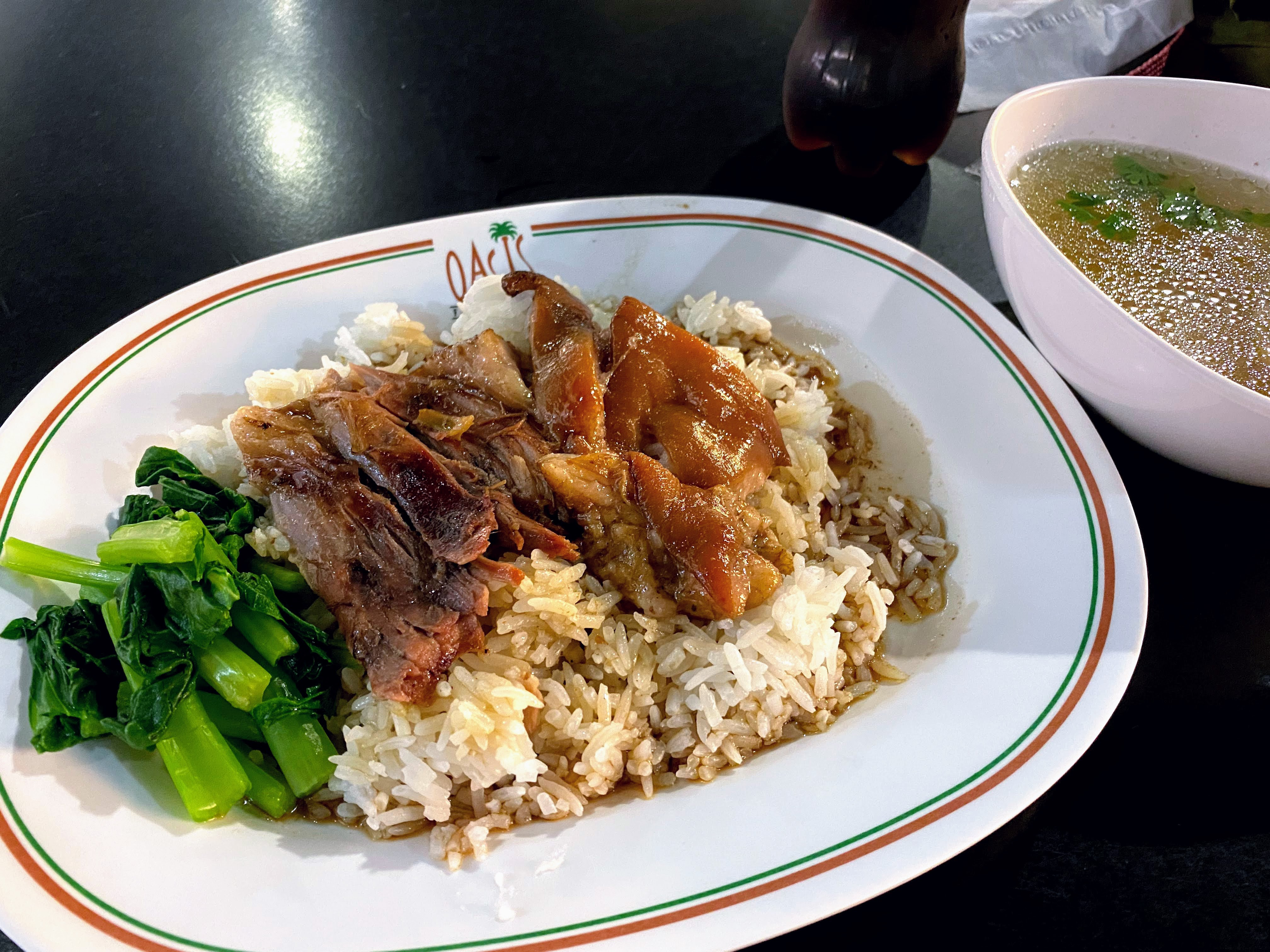
Khao kha mu

Khao kha mu or khao kha moo (Thai: ข้าวขาหมู, pronounced [kʰâːw kʰǎː mǔː], lit. 'rice leg-pork'; Chinese: 猪脚饭, pinyin: zhū jiǎo fàn), or sometimes simply called kha mu (ขาหมู), is a popular Thai food. It is influenced by Chinese cuisine, specifically Teochew cuisine.

Khao kha mu is an individual dish consisting of stewed pork knuckles in condensed hot pottage (some recipes are mixed with cocoa powder or boiled peanuts), then it will be cut into thin slices and topped on steamed rice. The dish is served with half-spiced corned eggs, small pieces of pickled mustard greens, and occasionally blanched Chinese broccoli with fresh bird's-eye chili peppers and cloves of garlic on the side. Sometimes it is eaten with clear broth soup. The accompanying dipping sauce is most often made of yellow chili peppers, garlic, granulated salt, limeade, and vinegar.

Khao kha mu is a food that can be found online from street stalls, food courts in department stores to luxury restaurants.

For Bangkok, there are many famous khao kha mu restaurants in various neighbourhoods such as Bang Wa, Phlapphla Chai, Mo Mi, Sam Yan, etc. A restaurant in Bang Rak received Bib Gourmand awards in both 2018 and 2019 Michelin Guide.
