= Hsin Tung Yang =

Food service company in Taiwan

Hsin Tung Yang 新東陽
- Company type: Limited company (Ltd.)
- Industry: Foodservice
- Founded: 1972
- Headquarters: Taipei, Taiwan
- Products: Preserved meat products
- Number of employees: 251 to 500
- Website: www.hty.com.tw

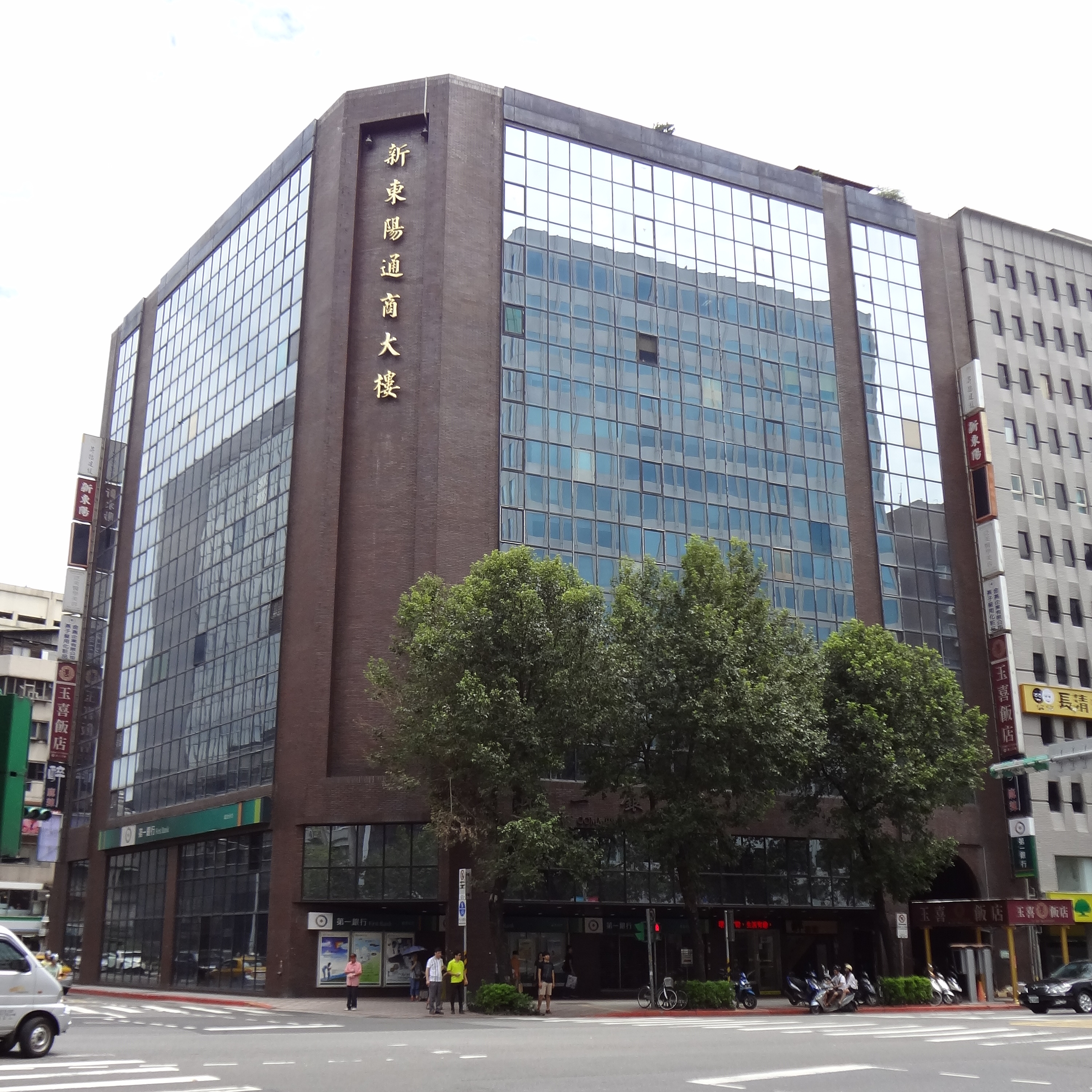
Hsin Tung Yang Commerce Building

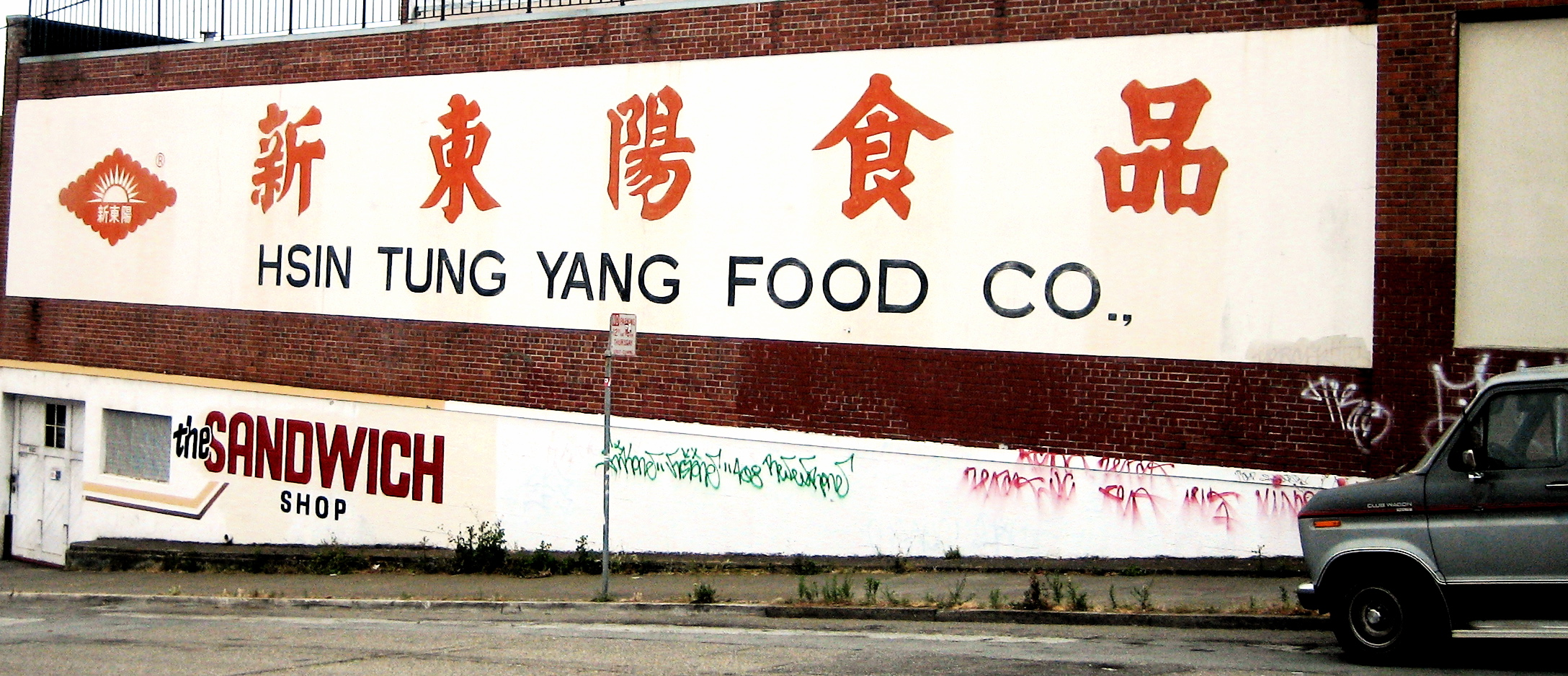
Hsin Tung Yang Food Co. sign in San Francisco, CA

Hsin Tung Yang (Chinese: 新東陽; Wade–Giles: Hsin^{1}Tung^{1}Yang^{2}; lit. 'new horizons') is a food service company and retailer based in Taipei, Taiwan.

== Overview ==
Hsin Tung Yang specializes primarily in meat and pork products such as pork sung (肉鬆; i.e. "meat floss"), and bakkwa (肉乾; i.e. pork jerky). In recent years the company has expanded production into dried mullet roe and various Chinese tea snacks. In addition to its retail stores, the company also manages service areas and stores in airports. As of 2011, the company has over 70 retail stores in Taiwan.

== History ==
Hsin Tung Yang was founded by Mai Hsin-Fu and first started operations in 1967 under the name "Hsin Tung Yang Barbeque Meat Company" (新東陽燒臘行), and established itself as a company in 1972 as "Mai's Hsin Tung Yang Food Co. Ltd" (麥氏新東陽食品股份有限公司). In 1979, Hsin Tung Yang USA was established in San Francisco, California, USA.

In 1988, the company had expanded to 46 branches in Taiwan, Hong Kong, Canada, and the United States, producing over 3600 varieties of food items. In November 1988, the company began construction on a new factory in Ipoh, Malaysia with the intent of relocating some of its food operations there due to rising market costs and market expansion. In 1991, the company was publicly listed on the Taiwan Stock Exchange. In May 2008, the company's pork sung was pulled from supermarket shelves in Hong Kong after the asthma drug clenbuterol was found in its products.

In April 2010, it became one of the first retailers to begin accepting payment using the EasyCard, a contactless smart card already in use on the Taipei Metro system.

== See also ==
- List of companies of Taiwan
