= Taipei Huannan Market COVID-19 cluster =

2021 disease outbreak in Taiwan

The Taipei Huannan Market COVID-19 cluster was a cluster of COVID-19 infections associated with the Taipei Agricultural Products Marketing Corporation (TAPMC), Binjiang Market, and Huannan Market in Taipei, Taiwan. The outbreak began on 14 May 2021 with the onset of illness in a vegetable auctioneer at the First Market of the Taipei Agricultural Products Marketing Corporation (TAPMC). According to subsequent reports, the company did not immediately disclose information or implement response measures, the Taipei City Government did not establish screening stations at an early stage, and the Council of Agriculture, the competent authority, did not promptly announce preventive measures. It was not until 10 June that TAPMC issued a press release confirming infections at the Second Market. As a result, consumers and vendors were exposed without full knowledge of the situation. The outbreak eventually resulted in a total of 247 confirmed cases linked to the First Market, Binjiang Market, and Huannan Market.

== Timeline ==
According to Investigation Report No. 111-She-Diao-0001 issued by the Control Yuan, the first vegetable auctioneer at TAPMC's First Market developed symptoms on 14 May, was reported on 18 May, and was confirmed positive on 20 May. The first Huannan Market case developed symptoms on 15 May, was reported on 2 June, and confirmed on 3 June. The earliest Binjiang Market case developed symptoms and was reported on 25 May, and was confirmed on 27 May. These represented the first recorded cases in the three markets.

On 5 June, central and local authorities held a meeting on establishing screening stations at fruit and vegetable wholesale markets in Taipei and New Taipei City. The meeting recommended that the Taipei City Government establish a rapid screening station at TAPMC's First Market, but the proposal was not adopted.

On 13 June, the Taipei City Government launched the "TAPMC Rapid Screening Project", through which 45 cases were identified within one week.

On 18 June, Taipei City Councillor Hsu Shu-hua criticized the city government's contact tracing and quarantine measures, arguing that confirmed cases were recorded only as Taipei cases without tracing or notifying other counties and cities.

On 21 June, TAPMC established a screening station at Wanda Elementary School, followed by another at Binjiang Market on the next day, more than two weeks after the 5 June meeting. Interviews with truck drivers and security personnel revealed that TAPMC lacked effective control over actual entries and exits and was unable to determine contacts after infections occurred. The Central Epidemic Command Center (CECC) requested lists of freight drivers and unloading workers, but TAPMC had never compiled such records.

Between 22 and 23 June, infections at TAPMC's First Market reached their peak, with 19 new cases reported over two days. Taipei Mayor Ko Wen-je stated during a press conference that the available data suggested sporadic infections rather than a concentrated cluster.

On 23 June, after a joint meeting between Ko, the Council of Agriculture, and the CECC, a consensus was reached to establish an inter-county database based on national identification numbers, allowing epidemiological information to be shared across jurisdictions and reducing information gaps.

On 24 June, access controls were strengthened, requiring proof of a negative rapid test before entry into the First Market, Binjiang Market, and related facilities. Ko criticized deficiencies in the central contact tracing platform, arguing that the system made it difficult for Taipei authorities to track infected individuals arriving from other counties. A subsequent statement by the Control Yuan clarified that both central and local governments had room for improvement, while noting that lists of cross-county contacts had been provided during the early stages of the outbreak.

On 26 June, Ko reversed his earlier position and announced that Wang Pi-sheng would be invited to conduct large-scale PCR testing and establish a forward command post at Binjiang Market and Wanda Market, integrating epidemiological investigations, testing, and vaccination services.

On 27 June, Taipei city councillors criticized the city government for failing to publish contact-tracing information and cumulative case numbers, arguing that infection figures became known only through media investigations or disclosures by legislators. Critics also pointed out that TAPMC had failed to release information promptly when the outbreak first emerged in May, exposing consumers and vendors to unnecessary risks.

On 2 July, PCR testing at Huannan Market identified 41 confirmed cases. The CECC and Taipei City Government jointly held a press conference. Legislator Freddy Lim criticized Ko for failing to conduct comprehensive testing earlier and argued that testing efforts remained insufficient, prompting a rebuttal from Huannan Market Self-Governance Association chairman Lin Sheng-tung, who accused Lim of neglecting local concerns.

On 9 July, the Joint Forward Command Center for TAPMC and Huannan Market held its fifth meeting, attended by CECC executive director Wang Pi-sheng and Taipei Mayor Ko Wen-je. Wang stated that only three new cases had been identified during the second round of large-scale PCR testing.

On 15 July, the Taipei City Government ordered that entry to TAPMC facilities required a TAPMC access permit, vaccination card, negative PCR result, or certificate of release from isolation. The Centers for Disease Control officially closed the investigation into the outbreak, reporting a total of 247 cases, including 105 linked to TAPMC's First Market, 24 linked to Binjiang Market, and 118 linked to Huannan Market.

== Aftermath and Review ==
On 19 January 2022, the Control Yuan released an investigative report identifying several shortcomings in the Taipei City Government's response, including:

- Failure to promptly strengthen testing and control mechanisms for nearly one month after the first case was detected.
- Conducting epidemiological investigations only for infected individuals residing in Taipei City, while failing to trace infected persons from other counties and cities.

On 14 February 2022, Deputy Mayor Huang Shan-shan stated during a COVID-19 press conference that, during the outbreak at the Taipei Agricultural Products Marketing Corporation (TAPMC), the city government was unable to access patients' workplace information. As a result, it could not obtain information on cases from other counties and cities when the outbreak occurred. She argued that shortcomings in the central government's epidemiological investigation system, rather than the Taipei City Government, were responsible for the problem. When Mayor Ko Wen-je was asked whether he should apologize for the outbreak that infected 247 people, he replied that the issue had become a matter of political attacks. He argued that epidemic prevention involved medical expertise and suggested that investigations should be conducted by medical professionals rather than by individuals without medical backgrounds.

On 17 February 2022, the Control Yuan issued a statement clarifying that:

- Its investigation focused on possible administrative negligence and did not accuse the city government of medical malpractice.
- It noted that, during a press conference on 22 June 2021, Ko had explicitly stated that "the data suggested sporadic infections rather than a cluster outbreak."
- The Centers for Disease Control (CDC) had provided information on infections involving other counties and cities from the beginning of the TAPMC outbreak and had reminded the Taipei City Government that it should not limit its analysis to Taipei residents, as the city government possessed the capacity to conduct epidemiological investigations.
- Regarding problems with the contact-tracing platform, the Control Yuan concluded that both central and local governments had room for improvement and requested that the CDC review and improve the system.

== Controversy ==
On 22 July 2021, Ko Wen-je remarked that "I was the one doing all the work" and questioned what contributions Wang Pi-sheng had made. The comments were criticized by observers as ungrateful and dismissive of Wang's role. Ko later apologized during a subsequent press conference.
