= Pong Cheng-sheng =

Taiwanese politician and engineer (born 1951)

- 彭振聲
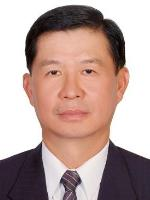

Deputy Mayor of Taipei
- In office 25 December 2018 – 25 December 2022 Serving with Teng Chia-chi, Tsai Ping-kun
- Mayor: Ko Wen-je
- Succeeded by: Lee Shu-chuan

Personal details
- Born: 25 October 1951 (age 74) Kaohsiung, Taiwan
- Education: National Kaohsiung First University of Science and Technology (BS, MS, PhD)

Pong Cheng-sheng (Chinese: 彭振聲; pinyin: Péng Zhènshēng; born 25 October 1951) is a Taiwanese politician and engineer.

== Education ==
Pong earned a master's degree in civil engineering in 2001 and his Ph.D. in engineering in 2011, both from National Kaohsiung First University of Science and Technology. His doctoral dissertation was titled, "Research on Taiwan's large-scale orbital system BOT" (Chinese: 台灣大型軌道系統BOT之研究).

== Political career ==
Pong served as deputy mayor of Taipei from 25 December 2018 to 25 December 2022. In December 2024, Pong was indicted as part of an investigation into corruption charges against Ko Wen-je. Pong pled guilty and was subsequently released on bail. After he learned that his wife had died of a fall in Kaohsiung on 1 July 2025, Pong recanted his confession.
