= Tsai Ping-kun =

Taiwanese politician and educator (born 1959)

- 蔡炳坤
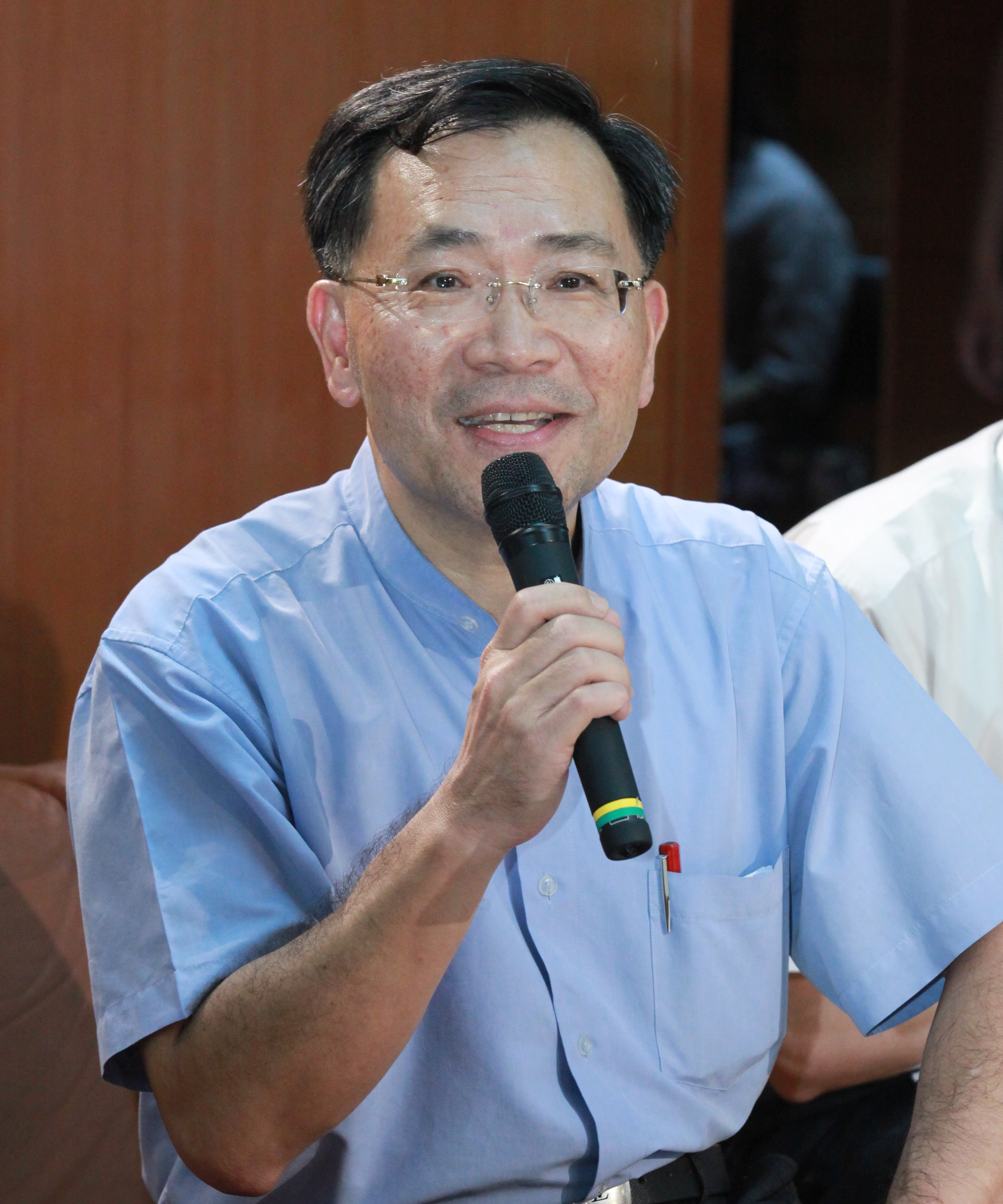
- Tsai in 2015

Deputy Mayor of Taipei
- In office 26 March 2019 – 25 December 2022 Serving with Pong Cheng-sheng, Teng Chia-chi
- Mayor: Ko Wen-je

Political Deputy Minister of Culture
- In office 9 November 2015 – 20 May 2016
- Minister: Hung Meng-chi
- Preceded by: Vicki Chiu

Deputy Mayor of Taichung
- In office 25 December 2010 – 19 December 2014 Serving with Hsiao Chia-chi
- Mayor: Jason Hu

Personal details
- Born: 1959 (age 66–67) Caotun, Nantou County, Taiwan
- Party: Taiwan People's Party
- Education: National Hualien University of Education (BEd); National Chengchi University (MA, DEd)

Tsai Ping-kun (Chinese: 蔡炳坤; pinyin: Cài Bǐngkūn; born 1959) is a Taiwanese politician and educator.

== Early life and education ==
Tsai was born in Caotun, Nantou County, in 1959, and graduated from Taichung Municipal Taichung Industrial High School.

After high school, Tsai earned a B.Ed. from the National Hualien University of Education, then earned his M.Ed. in 1995 and his D.Ed. from National Chengchi University in 1995 and 2006, respectively. His doctoral dissertation was titled, "A study of the leadership of high school principals, organizational commitment, and organizational effectiveness" (高中校長領導行為、教師組織承諾與學校組織效能關係之研究).

== Career ==
Tsai was an independent politician before joining the Taiwan People's Party. He worked for the Ministry of Education as a division chief and was deputy commissioner of the Taichung County Cultural Affairs Department. Tsai served as president of the National Taichung First Senior High School through 2007, becoming principal at Taipei Municipal Jianguo High School in 2008. In 2010, Tsai was appointed deputy mayor of Taichung, alongside Hsiao Chia-chi, and under Jason Hu. Between 2015 and 2016, Tsai was deputy minister of culture. Tsai served as a mediator between the Executive Yuan and student protestors who organized the Anti-Black Box Curriculum Movement in 2015. In March 2019, Tsai was appointed deputy mayor of Taipei by Ko Wen-je.

Tsai was hospitalized on 11 July 2022 at Taipei's Renai City Hospital after suffering a hemorrhagic stroke.
