= Ko Wen-je =

Taiwanese physician and politician (born 1959)

- 柯文哲
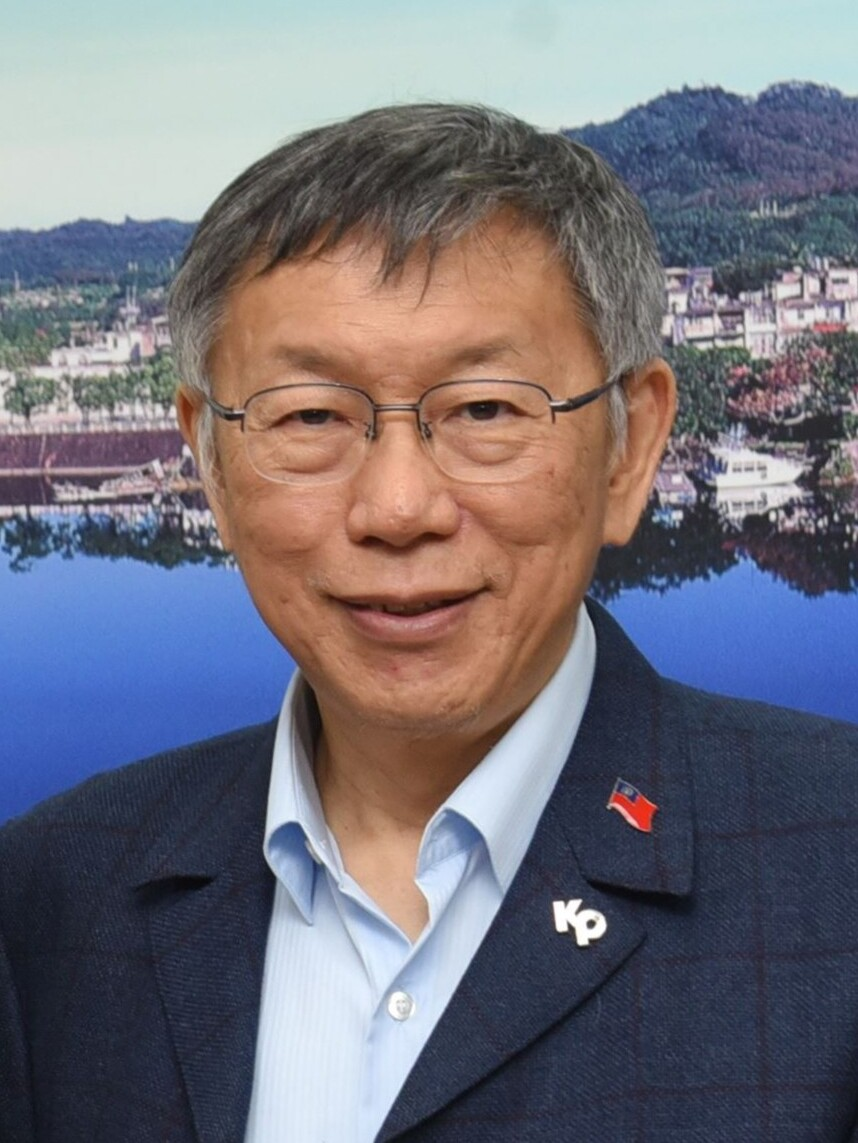
- Ko in 2026

1st Chairman of the Taiwan People's Party
- In office 6 August 2019 – 1 January 2025 (Note: Powers and duties suspended from 29 August 2024)
- Preceded by: Position established
- Succeeded by: Huang Kuo-chang (Note: During Ko's suspension, the Central Emergency Response Council, led by Huang Kuo-chang, Lin Fu-nan, and Lee Wei-hua, carried out the party chair's duties.)

13th Mayor of Taipei
- In office 25 December 2014 – 25 December 2022
- Deputy: See list: Charles Lin; Chou Li-fang; Chen Chin-jun; Teng Chia-chi; Pong Cheng-sheng; Tsai Ping-kun; Huang Shan-shan
- Preceded by: Hau Lung-pin
- Succeeded by: Chiang Wan-an

Personal details
- Born: 6 August 1959 (age 67) Hsinchu City, Taiwan
- Party: Taiwan People's Party (after 2019)
- Spouse: Chen Pei-chi (m. 1991)
- Children: 3
- Education: National Taiwan University (MB, PhD)
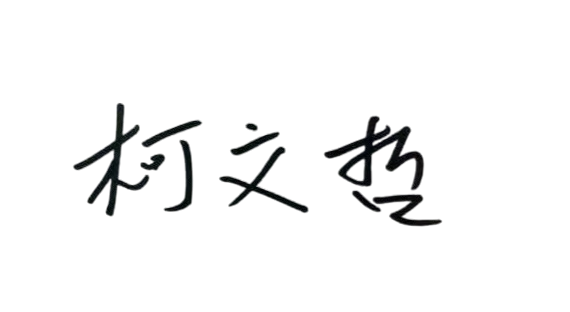
- Signature
- Scientific career
- Fields: Intensive care medicine
- Workplaces: University of Minnesota; National Taiwan University College of Medicine
- Thesis: Extracorporeal membrane oxygenation: Clinical applications and prognosis projection (2002)

Chinese name
- Chinese: 柯文哲
Transcriptions
Standard Mandarin
- Hanyu Pinyin: Kē Wénzhé
- Bopomofo: ㄎㄜ ㄨㄣˊ ㄓㄜˊ
- Gwoyeu Romatzyh: Ke Wenjer
- Wade–Giles: Kʻo^{1} Wen^{2}-che^{2}
- Tongyong Pinyin: Ke Wún-jhé
- IPA: [kʰɤ́ wə̌n.ʈʂɤ̌]
Southern Min
- Hokkien POJ: Koa Bûn-tiat

Ko Wen-je (Chinese: 柯文哲; pinyin: Kē Wénzhé; born 6 August 1959), also known by his nickname Ko P, (Note: Chinese: 柯P; pinyin: Kē Pī; Pe̍h-ōe-jī: Koa Phi) is a Taiwanese politician, physician, and transplant surgeon who served as the 13th mayor of Taipei from 2014 to 2022. He founded the Taiwan People's Party (TPP) in 2019 and was the party's first chairman until 2025.

A specialist in intensive care medicine and traumatology, Ko earned his doctorate from National Taiwan University in 2002, became a surgeon at National Taiwan University Hospital (NTUH), and taught as a professor at the National Taiwan University College of Medicine. Before entering politics, he pioneered the use of extracorporeal membrane oxygenation (ECMO) in Taiwan and led efforts to standardize organ transplant procedures.

In the 2014 local elections, Ko ran successfully as an independent candidate for the Taipei mayoralty, defeating Kuomintang (KMT) nominee Sean Lien with the support of the Democratic Progressive Party (DPP). During his mayoralty, he expanded public housing projects and introduced new transportation infrastructure initiatives, while his relationship with the DPP deteriorated over political differences, including those related to cross-strait relations. He won re-election in the 2018 Taipei mayoral election and established the TPP as a third way alternative to the KMT and DPP. After leaving office, he ran in the 2024 presidential election with Cynthia Wu as his running mate and placed third, after Lai Ching-te and Hou Yu-ih, with 26 percent of the popular vote.

In August 2024, Ko was arrested during a corruption investigation involving the Core Pacific City redevelopment project during his time as mayor and alleged mishandling of political donations. He spent a year in pretrial detention before being released on bail in September 2025. In March 2026, the Taipei District Court convicted him for bribery and embezzlement, sentencing him to 17 years in prison and six years' deprivation of civil rights. Ko has denied wrongdoing and appealed the verdict, while his prosecution and imprisonment have prompted controversy and allegations of politically motivated persecution.

== Early life and education ==
Ko Wen-je was born in Hsinchu, Taiwan, on August 6, 1959, to Ho Jui-ying (Chinese: 何瑞英) and Ko Cheng-fa (Chinese: 柯承發; 1932–2025). He has a younger brother and sister, both of whom earned doctorates in information management and physiology, respectively. His father, Cheng-fa, was an elementary school teacher who graduated from the National Hsinchu University of Education. His paternal grandfather, Ko Shih-yuan (柯世元), was a teacher who was arrested and tortured during the February 28 incident, and died three years after. His paternal great-grandfather, Ko Hsien-yin (柯賢蔭), was the manager of a Buddhist temple in Baoshan, Hsinchu.

In 1974, Ko began attending National Hsinchu Senior High School, where four uncles and his brother had previously attended. He won awards in multiple subjects— including mathematics, biology, chemistry, and English—and graduated in 1977 as class valedictorian. In 1978, he enrolled at National Yang-Ming University to study medicine, but chose to resit the college entrance examinations and transferred to National Taiwan University (NTU) in 1979. He earned his Bachelor of Medicine (M.B.) from NTU in 1986. As a medical student, he worked in the emergency care and intensive care units at the National Taiwan University Hospital. In order to pay for the school's tuition, Ko's father went to the Marshall Islands to work as a plumber and electrician.

From 1993 to 1994, Ko studied in the United States at the University of Minnesota, (Note: Ko had won a government scholarship to study at the University of Minnesota Medical School, having scored 610 out of 677 on the Test of English as a Foreign Language (TOEFL). He was the lone Taiwanese student at the school and roomed in a dormitory of foreign students.) where he was a clinical research fellow in surgery, specialized in organ transplantation, and began a medical research project on artificial livers. He returned to NTU in September 1994 to complete doctoral studies in medicine and earned his Ph.D. in clinical medicine in 2002. His doctoral dissertation was titled, "Extracorporeal membrane oxygenation: Clinical applications and prognosis projection" (Chinese: 體外膜氧合術:臨床應用與預後之預測).

== Early medical career ==
After graduating from medical school in 1986, Ko briefly worked in the anesthesiology department of a hospital in Hsinchu. He passed the national medical licensing examination with the highest score in the country. From October 1986 to August 1988, Ko fulfilled his compulsory military service in the Republic of China Army, serving as a medical officer with the rank of second lieutenant in the 269th Mechanized Infantry Division. In September 1988, he began his surgical residency at National Taiwan University Hospital (NTUH). Under the influence of his mentor, cardiovascular surgeon Chu Shu-hsun, Ko pursued surgical intensive care medicine, developing expertise in trauma care, emergency medicine, organ transplantation, extracorporeal membrane oxygenation (ECMO), and artificial organs.

== Transplant surgeon and professor ==
Ko in September 2014, a professor at the National Taiwan University College of Medicine

After returning to Taiwan from the University of Minnesota, Ko became involved in NTUH's heart transplantation program under Chu's direction, taking responsibility for the care of transplant recipients before and after surgery. His work increasingly focused on using extracorporeal membrane oxygenation (ECMO) to provide temporary circulatory support to patients experiencing severe heart failure while awaiting transplantation or recovering from surgery. NTUH performed its first ECMO procedure on 11 August 1994 and subsequently developed a specialized program for supporting patients undergoing cardiac surgery and transplantation. In November 1994, the hospital successfully performed a heart transplant on a patient who had received ECMO support for 18 days, the first reported successful case of its kind in Taiwan.

Ko also conducted research into the use of ECMO in organ donation after circulatory death, particularly as a means of preserving donated organs after cardiac arrest. In a 2000 study published in the medical journal Clinical Transplantation, Ko and three colleagues described using ECMO to maintain oxygenated blood circulation in the abdominal organs of deceased donors, thereby reducing the risk of tissue damage before organ procurement. Their study reported the procurement of eight kidney grafts from four donors whose hearts had stopped beating, with six grafts demonstrating immediate postoperative function. In a subsequent study published in 2005, Ko and seven colleagues analyzed 219 kidney transplant recipients treated at NTUH between February 1998 and June 2003, comparing outcomes among recipients of kidneys from living donors, donors with beating hearts, and donors whose organs had been preserved using ECMO after cardiac death.

Ko attending a symposium on trauma and integrated medicine in December 2014

Ko became an assistant professor of medicine at the National Taiwan University College of Medicine in July 2002, was promoted to associate professor in September 2008, and became a full professor in August 2013. In addition to his other research, he was involved in developing Taiwan's centralized organ donation and transplantation registration system, established to coordinate organ allocation among hospitals. He helped to develop donor registration forms, organ-matching rules, computer systems, and the organizational framework for organ procurement. Taiwan's national organ donation and transplantation registration and allocation system began operating on 1 April 2005.

In November 2006, Ko provided medical advice and coordinated assistance from NTUH physicians for Shirley Shaw (邵曉鈴), the wife of Taichung mayor Jason Hu, after she was critically injured in a traffic accident.

In 2008, Ko co-authored a study in The Lancet comparing conventional cardiopulmonary resuscitation (CPR) with resuscitation assisted by extracorporeal life support among adults experiencing in-hospital cardiac arrest. From August 2008 to February 2014, he served as director of NTUH's Department of Traumatology, succeeding Lee Yuan-chi (李元麒). During his tenure, NTUH's ECMO team, including intensive care physicians, cardiovascular surgeons, nurses, and technicians, provided emergency treatment and technical assistance to hospitals throughout Taiwan.

=== HIV-positive organ transplant incident ===
In August 2011, NTUH and National Cheng Kung University Hospital mistakenly transplanted organs from a donor infected with HIV into five patients. An investigation by Taiwan's Department of Health found that the donor's positive HIV test result had been incorrectly recorded as negative following a verbal miscommunication between hospital personnel, while deficiencies in verification procedures and medical supervision had allowed the error to go undetected. As the physician responsible for NTUH's organ procurement team, Ko was referred for disciplinary proceedings after investigators concluded that he had improperly delegated medical decisions and failed to adequately supervise the verification of laboratory results.

On 14 August 2012, the Control Yuan approved an impeachment motion against Ko, alleging that he had neglected his supervisory responsibilities, permitted personnel without appropriate medical qualifications to perform certain duties, and failed to establish sufficient training and oversight procedures for transplant coordinators. On 2 August 2013, the Commission on the Disciplinary Sanctions of Functionaries ordered Ko's demotion by two civil-service grades, a penalty implemented by NTUH on 9 August. Ko's wife Chen Pei-chi, also a physician, publicly challenged the disciplinary proceedings and disputed the accuracy of the hospital's submissions to investigators.

=== Later medical career and retirement ===
Ko in 2022, wearing his former National Taiwan University Hospital physician's coat

In May 2013, Tseng Yu-tzu (曾御慈), an NTUH emergency physician and former student of Ko, was fatally injured after being struck by a drunk driver while crossing a street. Ko was among the physicians, colleagues, and relatives of Tseng who established the Taiwan Against Drunk Driving organization on 7 December 2013 to promote road safety and advocate measures against driving under the influence of alcohol.

In February 2014, Ko took a leave from NTUH to campaign for the Taipei mayoral election, ending his tenure as director of the Department of Traumatology. He retained his position as a professor at the National Taiwan University College of Medicine while on leave to serve as mayor of Taipei from 2014 to 2022. Following the completion of his second mayoral term, Ko returned to NTUH on 26 December 2022 to teach and do medical research. On 13 January 2023, he announced his decision to retire early from NTUH. His retirement took effect on 1 February 2023.

== Taipei mayoral campaigns ==
=== 2014 Taipei mayoral campaign ===
Ko with supporters in March 2014

Although he had never held public office, Ko had attracted media attention through his medical career and public commentary on political controversies since 2006. In 2013, his public comments on the death of army corporal Hung Chung-chiu associated him with the White Shirt Movement, which protested the military's handling of the case. By September 2013, Ko was considering running for Mayor of Taipei, although his father, whose family had been affected by the February 28 incident, opposed his entry into politics. On 6 January 2014, Ko formally announced his candidacy as an independent, citing the disciplinary proceedings against him following the 2011 HIV-positive organ transplant incident at National Taiwan University Hospital as one of the reasons for entering the race.

Ko wearing his white coat in September 2014 on campaign

Ko's candidacy coincided with growing dissatisfaction with the governing Kuomintang (KMT), particularly following the Sunflower Student Movement, which opposed the government's proposed trade agreement with China. He campaigned on overcoming the traditional divisions between the KMT-led pan-blue and Democratic Progressive Party (DPP)-led pan-green camps. His public image as an outspoken physician contrasted with that of his principal opponent, Sean Lien, the son of former vice president Lien Chan, whose wealthy family background became a subject of electoral debate.

Vote lead by district in the 2014 Taipei City mayoral election Ko lead > 20,300 Ko lead > 5,100 Ko lead < 5,100 Lien lead < 5,100 Lien lead > 5,100 Lien lead > 20,300

Although Ko declined to join the Democratic Progressive Party (DPP), he participated in its opposition candidate selection process, defeating legislator Pasuya Yao in opinion polls announced on 13 June. On 16 June, Ko reached an agreement with the DPP under which the party would support his campaign without requiring him to become a member. The DPP formally decided not to nominate its own mayoral candidate on 18 June.

Ko's campaign emphasized government transparency, civic participation, affordable housing, and administrative reform. In May, his open recruitment initiative attracted hundreds of young applicants, including participants in the Sunflower Student Movement. He appointed former New Party legislator Yao Li-ming as his campaign's executive director in July. His proposals included constructing 50,000 public rental housing units and expanding electronic payment services in Taipei. On the day of the election on 29 November, Ko won with 853,983 votes (57.16 percent), defeating Lien, who received 609,932 votes (40.82 percent). He became Taipei's first independent mayor since the city became a special municipality in 1967, ending 16 years of KMT control of the mayoralty.

2014 Taipei mayoral election result
No.	Candidate	Party	Votes	Percentage
1	Chen Ju-pin	Self Help Party	1,624	0.11%
2	Chao Yen-ching	Independent	15,898	1.06%
3	Lee Hung-hsin (李宏信)	Independent	2,621	0.18%
4	Chen Yung-chang	Independent	1,908	0.13%
5	Neil Peng	Independent	8,080	0.54%
6	Sean Lien	Kuomintang	609,932	40.82%
7	Ko Wen-je	Independent	853,983	57.16%

=== 2018 Taipei mayoral campaign ===
Vote lead by district in the 2018 Taipei City mayoral election Ko lead > 5,900 Ko lead > 1,500 Ko lead < 1,500 Ting lead < 1,500 Ting lead > 1,500 Ting lead > 5,900

In December 2016, Ko announced his intention to seek a second term as Mayor of Taipei. His relationship with the Democratic Progressive Party (DPP), which had supported his candidacy in 2014, became increasingly strained over his comments on cross-strait relations, particularly his description of Taiwan and China as "one family". On 2 May, the Kuomintang (KMT) selected former legislator Ting Shou-chung as its mayoral candidate following a four-way party primary. On 30 May, the DPP nominated legislator Pasuya Yao for mayor, establishing a three-way contest between Ko and the nominees of Taiwan's two major political parties.

Without the institutional backing of a political party, Ko sought alternative means of financing his re-election campaign, revealing in June that he had obtained a bank loan of approximately NT$20 million using his home as collateral. On 25 July, his campaign launched an online crowdfunding initiative with an initial fundraising target of NT$13.1 million. By the following morning, the campaign had collected approximately NT$37.5 million, substantially exceeding its initial target. His campaign office announced that funds exceeding the original target would be reserved until spending plans had been prepared and publicly disclosed. Ko formally registered his candidacy on 30 August. Despite the DPP's decision to field its own candidate, Ko retained support among some pan-green voters who regarded him as having a better chance than Yao of defeating Ting. On 23 November, Ko held his final campaign rally at Four Four South Village in Xinyi District, where deputy mayors Teng Chia-chi and Chen Chin-jun reiterated his appeal to transcend traditional partisan divisions.

The election took place on 24 November 2018, with ballot counting continuing until the following morning. According to the initial count, Ko won re-election with 580,820 votes (41.05 percent), narrowly defeating Ting, who received 577,566 votes (40.82 percent), while Yao placed third with 244,641 votes (17.29 percent). Ting challenged the result, alleging irregularities arising from the release of preliminary vote counts while some polling stations remained open because of long queues. Following a judicial recount, the Taipei District Court announced on 13 December that Ko had received 580,663 votes against Ting's 577,096, increasing Ko's margin of victory to 3,567 votes. Ting subsequently pursued litigation seeking to invalidate the election, but the Taiwan High Court upheld the dismissal of his lawsuit on 17 December 2019, bringing the electoral challenge to an end.

2018 Taipei mayoral election results (after recount)
No.	Candidate	Party	Votes	Percentage	Elected
1	Wu Er-yang	Independent	5,611	0.40%	
2	Ting Shou-chung	Kuomintang	577,096	40.82%	
3	Pasuya Yao	Democratic Progressive Party	244,342	17.28%	
4	Ko Wen-je	Independent	580,663	41.07%	
5	Lee Si-kuen	Independent	6,158	0.44%	

== Mayor of Taipei (2014–2022) ==
Ko (right) at the mayoral handover ceremony with his predecessor Hau Lung-pin (left) on 25 December 2014

Ko was inaugurated as the 13th mayor of Taipei on 25 December 2014, succeeding KMT politician Hau Lung-pin and becoming Taipei's first independent mayor since its designation as a special municipality in 1967. At his inauguration, Ko pledged to make evidence-based decisions and told municipal employees that residents should begin noticing changes within the first 100 days of his administration. Following the ceremony, he ordered the removal of dedicated bus lanes on Zhongxiao West Road outside Taipei Main Station, one of his first decisions as mayor.

Ko (left) presiding over his first municipal government meeting as mayor on 30 December 2014

=== Municipal administration and urban development ===
During his 2014 mayoral campaign, Ko proposed constructing 50,000 public rental housing units. In September 2019, Ko introduced the Housing Justice 2.0 initiative, which proposed expanding public housing, increasing rental subsidies, encouraging owners to rent vacant properties, and adjusting property taxes. According to an investigation by the Taiwan FactCheck Center, 4,807 social housing units were both started and completed during Ko's mayoralty, while an additional 1,297 units completed under his administration had been initiated under Hau. At the end of 2022, Taipei had 11,383 existing and newly completed municipally developed social housing units, including housing built or initiated under earlier administrations, the highest total among Taiwan's six special municipalities.

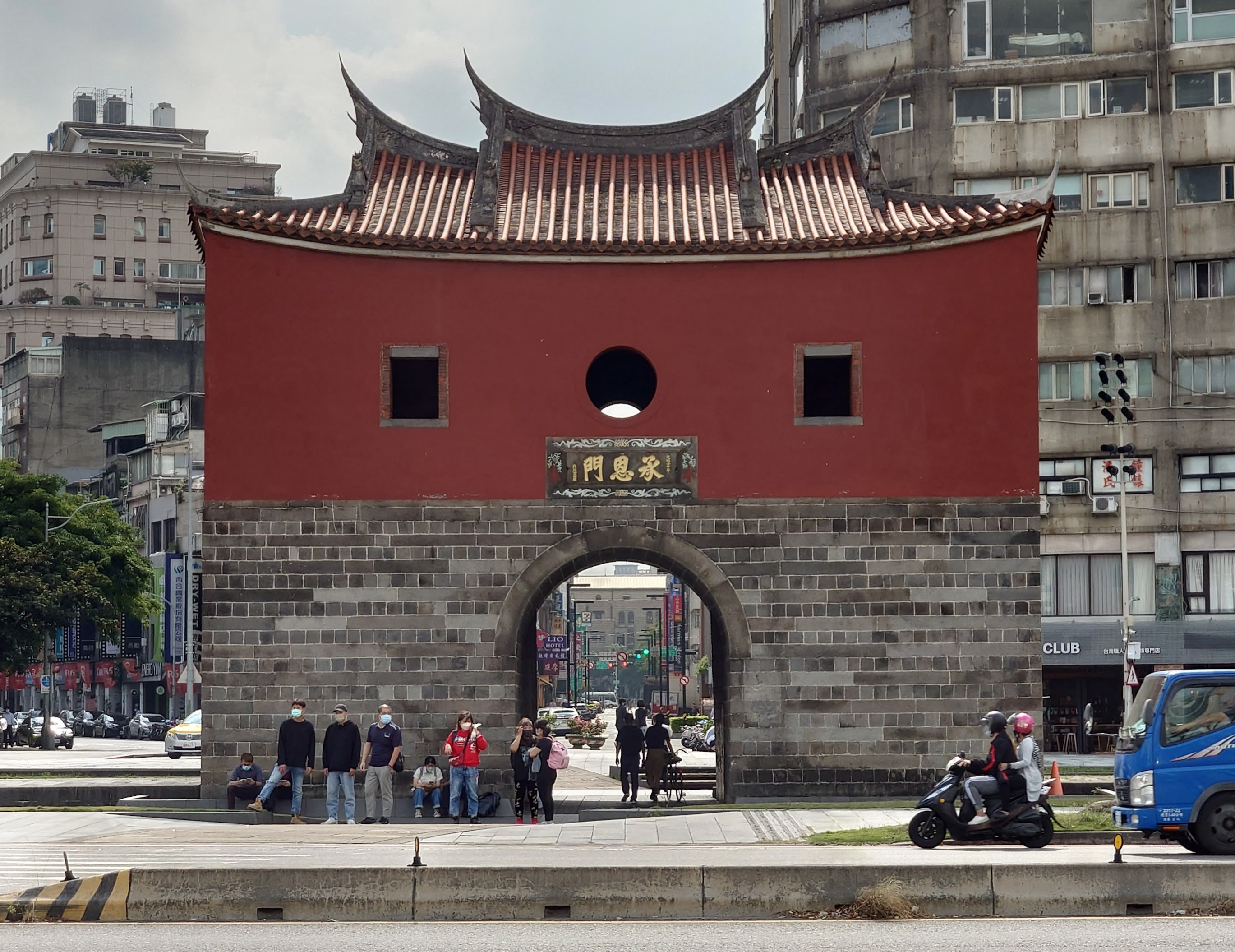
The Taipei North Gate, whose surrounding area was redeveloped during Ko's administration

Ko's administration pursued the Taipei West District Gateway Project, an urban renewal initiative centered on the area surrounding Taipei Main Station and the historic Taipei North Gate. The project sought to revitalize western Taipei through improvements to public spaces, the removal of elevated roadways, and the restoration of the surrounding area's historic character. In February 2016, the city demolished the 750-meter elevated approach to Zhongxiao Bridge, which had obstructed views of North Gate, completing the work ahead of schedule.

The administration also reconstructed several traditional markets, including Dalong Market, Huannan Market, Chenggong Market, and Nanmen Market. Dalong Market, whose previous building had been considered unsafe, reopened in December 2019 following reconstruction that began in 2017. The first phase of Huannan Market's reconstruction was completed in July 2020, following a redevelopment process that had been delayed for approximately 18 years. Nanmen Market closed for reconstruction in October 2019 and reopened in October 2023, after Ko had left office.

Ko at the groundbreaking ceremony for the Beitou Fuguo social housing development in June 2020

The municipal government accelerated the replacement of Taipei's remaining lead water pipes following concerns about lead contamination in drinking water. The project was completed in September 2017, replacing pipes serving 17,714 households at an additional cost of NT$420 million, approximately 15 months ahead of the revised schedule. His administration also constructed two detention basins in Wenshan District as part of a flood-prevention program, with Ko announcing in October 2017 that the district could be removed from the city's list of flood-prone areas.

In March 2018, Ko and New Taipei City mayor Eric Chu jointly announced a NT$1,280 monthly transportation pass covering unlimited journeys on the Taipei Metro and eligible buses in both municipalities, as well as the first 30 minutes of YouBike rentals. The pass entered service on 16 April 2018 as a joint initiative intended to encourage public transportation use and reduce commuting costs.

Ko's decision to discontinue general cash payments to elderly residents during the Double Ninth Festival in favor of other social welfare programs attracted criticism from city councilors and former mayor Hau. In June 2022, the Executive Yuan determined that city council regulations requiring the restoration of the payments did not violate national law, obliging the municipal government to comply.

During Ko's mayoralty, Taipei's outstanding municipal debt declined from NT$146.9 billion to NT$89.8 billion, a reduction of approximately NT$57.1 billion. An analysis of municipal financial records by the Taiwan FactCheck Center found that the debt reduction occurred between 2015 and 2019, while the city's outstanding debt remained approximately unchanged from 2020 through 2022.

=== Major projects and events ===
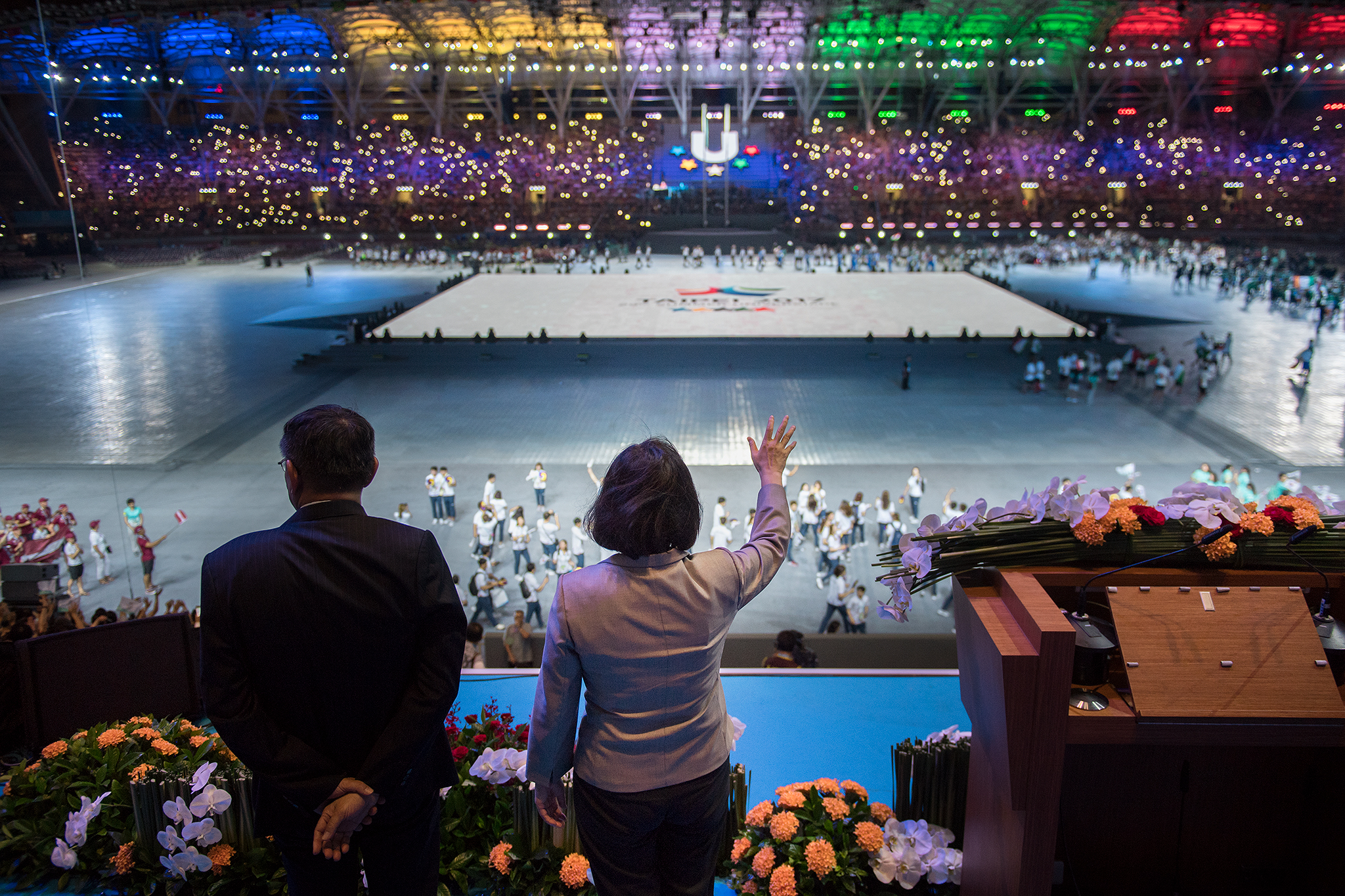
Ko with President Tsai Ing-wen at the opening ceremony of the 2017 Summer Universiade.

Ko's administration oversaw the organization of the 2017 Summer Universiade, an international university sporting event held in Taipei from 19 to 30 August 2017. Taipei had secured the hosting rights in 2011 under Ko's predecessor, Hau Lung-pin, after defeating Brasília in the bidding process. The opening ceremony on 19 August was disrupted by protesters opposing pension reform, delaying the entrance of participating athletes into the stadium. Taiwan's delegation won 26 gold, 34 silver, and 30 bronze medals, placing third in the medal standings.

Another prominent project during Ko's mayoralty was the Taipei Dome, a multipurpose stadium and commercial complex developed by Farglory Group, whose construction became the subject of prolonged disputes between the developer and the municipal government. On 20 May 2015, the city ordered construction to stop, citing concerns about damage to the nearby Songshan Tobacco Factory and potential effects on the Taipei Metro's Bannan line. The city subsequently identified 79 building features that deviated from the approved plans and required changes to fire safety and emergency evacuation arrangements. In July 2020, Ko announced revised safety arrangements that included additional emergency exits, improved fire compartmentalization, and a reduction in the complex's permitted capacity. Construction was authorized to resume in August 2020 after a suspension lasting more than five years.

=== Cross-strait relations ===
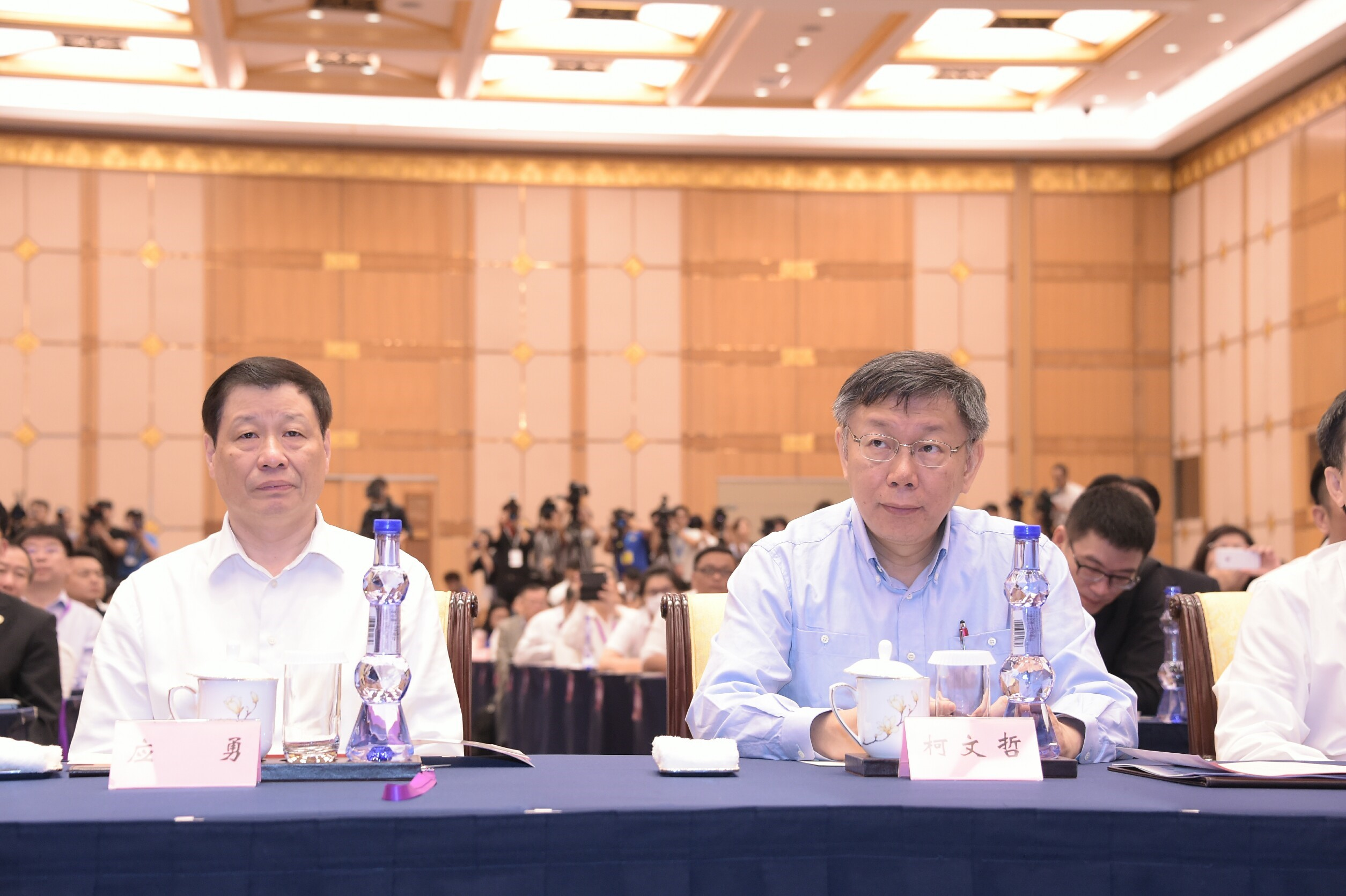
Ko meeting Shanghai mayor Ying Yong during the Taipei–Shanghai City Forum in July 2017

As mayor, Ko continued Taipei's annual city-to-city exchanges with Shanghai through the Taipei–Shanghai City Forum, which had been established under Hau Lung-pin in 2010. During the 2015 forum in Shanghai, Ko introduced the formulation that the two sides of the Taiwan Strait were "one family", which he repeated at the 2017 and 2019 forums. The formulation attracted criticism from supporters of Taiwan independence and members of the pan-green political camp, who regarded it as overly accommodating toward China.

In May 2018, Ko apologized for the controversy and explained that he had repeated the phrase in 2017 to express goodwill toward China ahead of the Summer Universiade. He nevertheless used the formulation again during the July 2019 forum, emphasizing the importance of continued dialogue and cooperation between the cities. At the July 2022 forum, held virtually during the COVID-19 pandemic, Ko criticized Chinese military aircraft operations near Taiwan and restrictions on Taiwanese agricultural imports, saying that such actions harmed relations between people across the strait.

=== Second term and departure ===
Ko at a municipal briefing concerning COVID-19 measures in May 2021.

Ko's second term was affected by the COVID-19 pandemic in Taiwan, particularly following a major outbreak of locally transmitted infections in May 2021 that included clusters in Taipei's Wanhua District. On 14 May, Ko announced that undocumented migrant workers who sought COVID-19 testing would not be punished or deported because of their immigration status, in an effort to encourage testing among vulnerable residents. In July 2021, another outbreak occurred at Huannan Market, where mass PCR testing identified 41 new positive cases in a single day. Ko and Minister of Health and Welfare Chen Shih-chung established a joint command post involving the Taipei City Government and the Central Epidemic Command Center to coordinate the response. The outbreak also generated a public disagreement between Ko and independent legislator Freddy Lim, who criticized the city's testing policy and the timing of the joint response.

During Ko's second term, Taipei's urban planning authorities approved changes to the redevelopment of Core Pacific City, a former shopping mall in Songshan District, increasing its permissible floor area ratio from 560 to 840 percent. In January 2024, the Control Yuan censured the Taipei City Government over the approval, finding that additional floor area incentives had been granted without sufficient legal authorization. The redevelopment subsequently became the subject of criminal proceedings against Ko, who was convicted at first instance in March 2026 of bribery related to the project and other offenses, receiving a combined sentence of 17 years' imprisonment in a judgment subject to appeal.

Ko's mayoralty ended on 25 December 2022, when he handed over office to KMT politician Chiang Wan-an, who had won the 2022 Taipei mayoral election.

== Taiwan People's Party chairman (2019–2025) ==
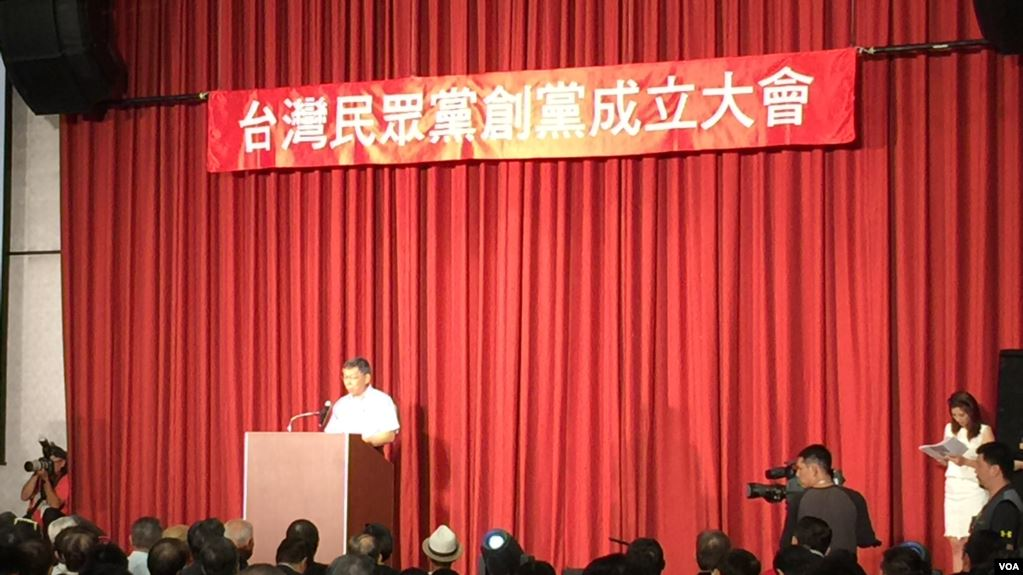
Ko speaking at the founding congress of the Taiwan People's Party on August 6, 2019

On August 1, 2019, while serving as Mayor of Taipei, Ko announced plans to establish a new political party, the Taiwan People's Party (TPP), which he presented as an alternative to the pan-blue and pan-green political camps traditionally led by the Kuomintang (KMT) and Democratic Progressive Party (DPP), respectively. The party was formally established on August 6, 2019, Ko's 60th birthday, at the National Taiwan University Hospital International Convention Center in Taipei, where Ko was elected its founding chairman. Of the party's 111 founding members, 72 attended the preliminary meeting to approve its constitution and elect its chairman. Several founding members were associated with Ko's municipal administration, including his adviser Tsai Pi-ru. On December 10, 2022, Ko was re-elected chairman with 3,780 votes in an uncontested election.

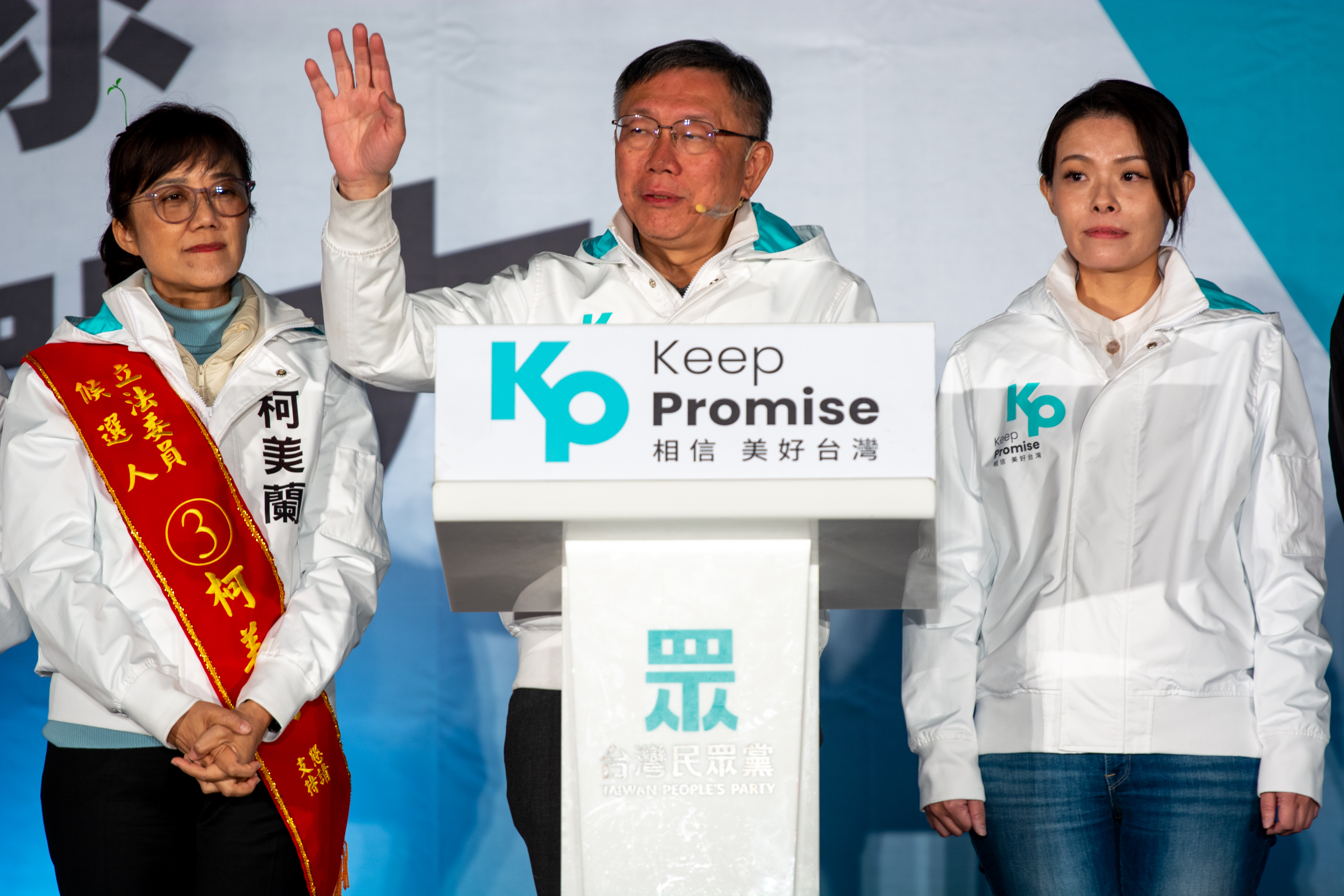
Ko (center) with Ko Mei-lan (left) and Hsinchu mayor Kao Hung-an (right) at a Taiwan People's Party campaign event in January 2024

On August 29, 2024, following allegations of irregularities in the financial reporting of his presidential campaign, Ko announced that he would take a three-month leave of absence from the TPP chairmanship while the party conducted an internal investigation. On November 18, the party's Central Committee approved a further three-month extension of his leave of absence, while maintaining that an acting chairman did not need to be appointed.

On January 1, 2025, Ko formally resigned as TPP chairman at an enlarged meeting of the party's Central Committee, saying that he did not want his continuing legal proceedings to obstruct the party's development. He stated that he would remain a party member and volunteer and endorsed TPP legislative caucus leader Huang Kuo-chang as his temporary successor. The Central Committee subsequently elected Huang acting chairman by a vote of 14 in favor, with Huang abstaining. Huang won the party's chairmanship by-election on February 15, 2025, securing the remainder of Ko's term through December 2026. In January 2026, the TPP announced that Ko would become dean of its Institute of National Governance as part of a reorganization of the party's leadership under Huang.

== 2024 presidential campaign ==
On 8 May 2023, Ko registered to seek the TPP nomination for the 2024 Taiwanese presidential election. The party formally nominated him as its presidential candidate on 17 May. Ko officially launched his campaign on 20 May at a press conference in Tamsui District, New Taipei City. He proposed establishing a coalition government and convening a national affairs conference involving leaders from different political parties to build consensus on major policy issues. Ko also criticized the administration of President Tsai Ing-wen for its handling of energy shortages, labor shortages, judicial reform, and Taiwan's declining birthrate.

=== Negotiations with the KMT ===
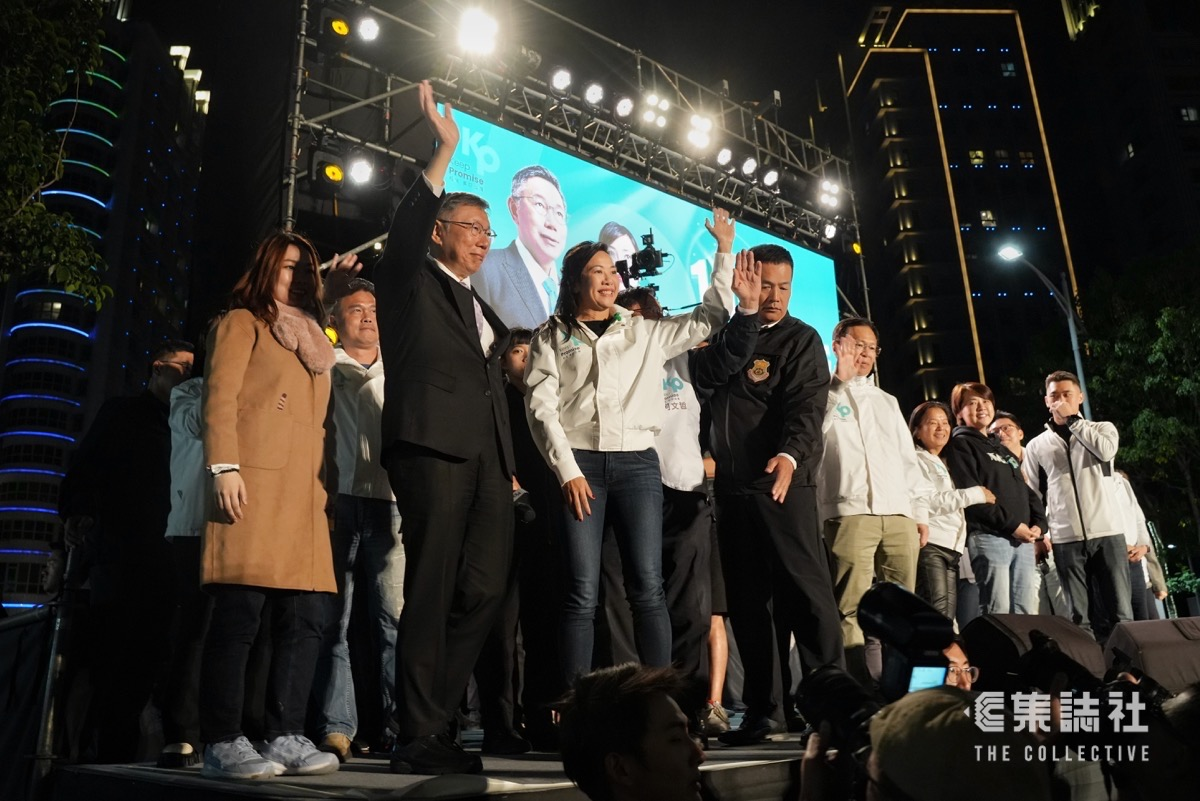
Ko Wen-je alongside his running mate Cynthia Wu on election night, 13 January 2024

During the second half of 2023, Ko entered negotiations with the KMT over the possibility of forming a joint opposition presidential ticket to challenge DPP nominee Lai Ching-te. The negotiations initially stalled over the mechanism for determining whether Ko or Hou Yu-ih should become the presidential candidate, with the KMT favoring an open primary and the TPP preferring public opinion polls. On 15 November, Ko, Hou, KMT chairman Eric Chu, and former president Ma Ying-jeou met at the Ma Ying-jeou Foundation in Taipei and announced an agreement to form a joint presidential ticket, with polling results determining which candidate would lead it. Under the agreement, results within the statistical margin of error would favor a Hou-led ticket, while a Ko-led ticket would receive a point only when its polling advantage exceeded that margin. But the agreement faltered on 18 November, when polling experts representing the two parties and Ma failed to agree on which surveys should be included or how their margins of error should be interpreted.

Results of the 2024 Taiwanese presidential election by county and city, showing the vote shares of Lai Ching-te, Hou Yu-ih, and Ko

On 23 November 2023, Ko invited Hou and independent presidential aspirant Terry Gou to a final round of negotiations at the Grand Hyatt Taipei, which was also attended by Chu and Ma. During the televised meeting, Hou read private text messages exchanged with Ko, prompting objections from Ko, with the discussion ending without an agreement. On 24 November, Ko registered his presidential candidacy with the Central Election Commission, selecting TPP legislator Cynthia Wu as his vice-presidential running mate. Hou separately registered his candidacy with Jaw Shaw-kong as his running mate, while Gou withdrew from the election, leaving three presidential tickets representing the DPP, KMT, and TPP.

=== Final campaign and election ===
Following the breakdown of the alliance, Ko continued campaigning as an alternative to the two major parties, describing the election as a contest between "new politics" and "old forces". His campaign attracted substantial support among younger voters, many of whom expressed dissatisfaction with the major parties' handling of employment, education, and housing affordability. Ko also developed a significant presence on social media, with more than 1.1 million Instagram followers and 200,000 TikTok followers shortly before the election, exceeding the respective followings of Lai and Hou.

In the presidential election held on 13 January 2024, Ko and Wu finished third with 3,690,466 votes, or 26.46 percent of the vote, behind Lai and Hsiao Bi-khim's 40.05 percent and Hou and Jaw's 33.49 percent.

== Core Pacific City controversy and imprisonment ==
=== Arrest and initial detention ===
On 30 August 2024, prosecutors searched Ko's residence and the headquarters of the Taiwan People's Party as part of an investigation into alleged corruption involving the Core Pacific City redevelopment project during his tenure as mayor. Ko was arrested the following day after being questioned by investigators about the city's approval of increased development rights for the project. On 2 September, the Taipei District Court ordered his release without bail, but prosecutors appealed the decision, leading the Taiwan High Court to overturn it and order a new detention hearing. On 5 September, the Taipei District Court ordered Ko to be detained incommunicado at the Taipei Detention Center in Tucheng District, New Taipei City. On 9 September, his lawyers announced that although they believed the detention ruling contained significant legal and factual errors, Ko had decided not to appeal it. On 1 November, the district court extended his incommunicado detention for another two months, citing concerns that his release could enable collusion with other suspects or interfere with the investigation.

=== Indictment and renewed detention ===
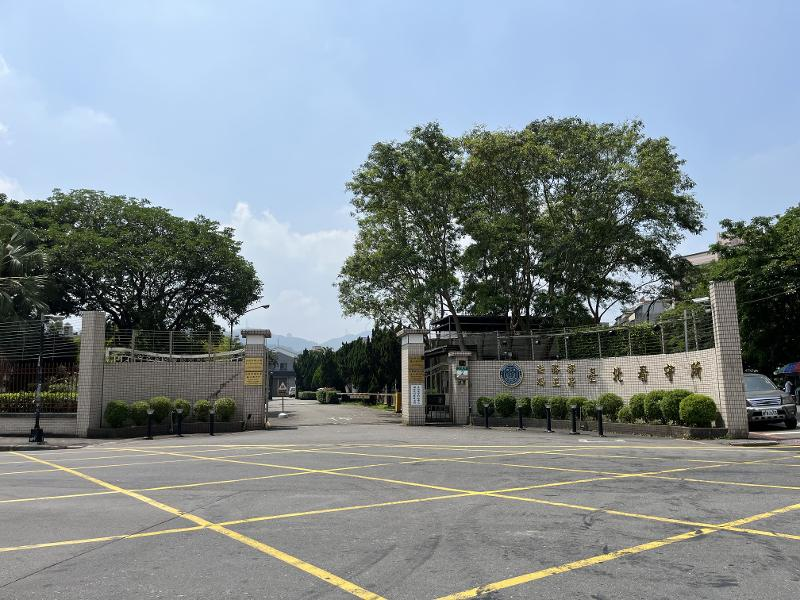
The Taipei Detention Center in Tucheng District, New Taipei City, where Ko was held during his pretrial detention from 2024 to 2025

On 26 December 2024, the Taipei District Prosecutors Office indicted Ko on charges including bribery, embezzlement and breach of trust in connection with the Core Pacific City project and the handling of political donations during his 2024 presidential campaign. Prosecutors sought a combined sentence of 28 years and six months in prison, while Ko denied wrongdoing and the TPP characterized the prosecution as politically motivated. On 27 December, the district court granted Ko bail of NT$30 million, allowing him to return home after 114 days in detention. Following an appeal by prosecutors, the Taiwan High Court overturned the bail ruling, and the district court subsequently increased Ko's bail to NT$70 million and required him to wear a monitoring device. Ko completed the revised bail arrangements and was released again on 30 December.

After the prosecution appealed again, the Taipei District Court ordered Ko's renewed incommunicado detention on 2 January 2025. On 11 January, thousands of TPP supporters gathered at Liberty Square in Taipei to protest what they described as political persecution and government interference in the judiciary. That same day, the Taiwan High Court rejected appeals filed by Ko and three other defendants against their continued detention.

Ko remained in custody when his father, Ko Cheng-fa (柯承發), died on 17 February 2025. Following a request submitted by his wife, detention authorities temporarily permitted him to leave custody to attend his father's funeral in Hsinchu on 10 March. In March 2025, he experienced medical problems involving kidney stones, prompting his wife and the TPP to express concerns about his condition and request treatment outside the detention center. On 28 March, the Taipei District Court extended his detention for another two months, citing continuing risks of flight, evidence destruction and collusion. On 2 April, Ko underwent a ureteroscopic procedure to remove a kidney stone. On 16 May, the district court rejected a motion filed by Ko's lawyers seeking his release on bail on medical grounds. The court subsequently extended his detention for additional two-month periods beginning on 2 June and 2 August.

=== Release on bail ===
On 5 September 2025, the Taipei District Court approved Ko's release on NT$70 million bail, finding that electronic monitoring and restrictions on his movements and communications could be imposed in place of continued detention. Ko completed the bail procedures and left custody on 8 September, after 363 days in detention. As part of the conditions of his release, he was required to remain at a designated residence, wear an electronic ankle monitor, carry a monitoring telephone, refrain from contacting other defendants or witnesses, and observe restrictions on overseas travel.

On 12 September, the Taiwan High Court overturned the bail ruling following an appeal by prosecutors and returned the matter to the district court for reconsideration. On 15 September, the district court again authorized Ko's release under the same NT$70 million bail requirement and accompanying restrictions. Prosecutors subsequently decided not to appeal the revised ruling, allowing Ko to remain out of custody while his trial continued.

=== Conviction and appeal (2026) ===
On 26 March 2026, the Taipei District Court convicted Ko of bribery, embezzlement and breach of trust in cases involving the Core Pacific City redevelopment project and the misuse of political donations, imposing a combined sentence of 17 years in prison and six years' deprivation of civil rights. The court found that Ko had accepted NT$2.1 million in bribes through intermediaries connected to Core Pacific Group chairman Sheen Ching-jing. Following the verdict, the district court maintained Ko's existing NT$70 million bail and electronic monitoring requirements rather than ordering his immediate detention.

Ko denied the charges and appealed the judgment, seeking to have his convictions overturned. On 8 September, the Taiwan High Court opened appellate proceedings, initially examining the allegations involving political donations. The prosecution also appealed aspects of the original judgment, arguing that certain sentences were too lenient. During a subsequent hearing on 19 October, the appellate court continued examining the political donations case, with further proceedings involving Ko on 16 November 2026.

== Political stances ==
=== Cross-Strait relations ===
In interviews leading up to the 2024 presidential election, Ko said that he would be pragmatic instead of ideological on foreign policy, including relations with the mainland and the US. He said that he would pursue both deterrence and dialogue to stabilize relations with the mainland and maintain peace, and that he offered a middle ground between what he described as the KMT’s submissiveness toward Beijing and the DPP’s approach of provoking conflict. Ko said that Taiwan was caught in the middle of the rivalry between the PRC and the US. Characterizing political relations as constantly changing, he proposed managing the three-way relationship in a "dynamic equilibrium". Instead of prioritizing one superpower over the other, he wanted Taiwan to adopt a flexible foreign policy that evaluates various options and adjusts policy accordingly.

As a prerequisite to cross-strait exchange, Ko said he believed in approaching the mainland from a position of defensive military strength. He called for increasing Taiwan’s defense spending from 2.5% to 3% of GDP, reforming training of conscripts, and continuing to invest in domestic defense industries. Abroad, he planned to improve relations with democratic allies in the region and to hold high-level defense talks with Japan and the US.

Ko stressed the necessity of dialogue with the mainland to maintain peace. He cited his experience organizing the annual Taipei-Shanghai City Forum when he was mayor as an example of establishing cross-strait exchange. On the issue of Taiwan independence, Ko said that maintaining the status quo was the only pragmatic option because declaring independence would lead to war. He said, "There’s no point in even talking about unification or independence right now because you can’t achieve either." Ko has never endorsed the 1992 Consensus, which Beijing has insisted as a condition of communication. Instead, he has proposed "five mutual principles", which asks both sides to "know, understand, respect, cooperate with, and forgive" each other. Ko has repeated the phrase, "Two sides of the strait are one family", echoing language used by General Secretary of the Chinese Communist Party Xi Jinping and inviting accusations of appeasing Beijing. He explained it as an "attitude" with which peace can be maintained.

Ko has voiced support for better economic relations with mainland China. He proposed restarting talks on the Cross-Strait Service Trade Agreement with mainland China, but with new transparency requirements; he withdrew the proposal after public criticism. He also proposed building a bridge between Kinmen and Xiamen, suggesting that it would solve many of Kinmen's problems related to water, power supply, and waste disposal.

== Personal life ==
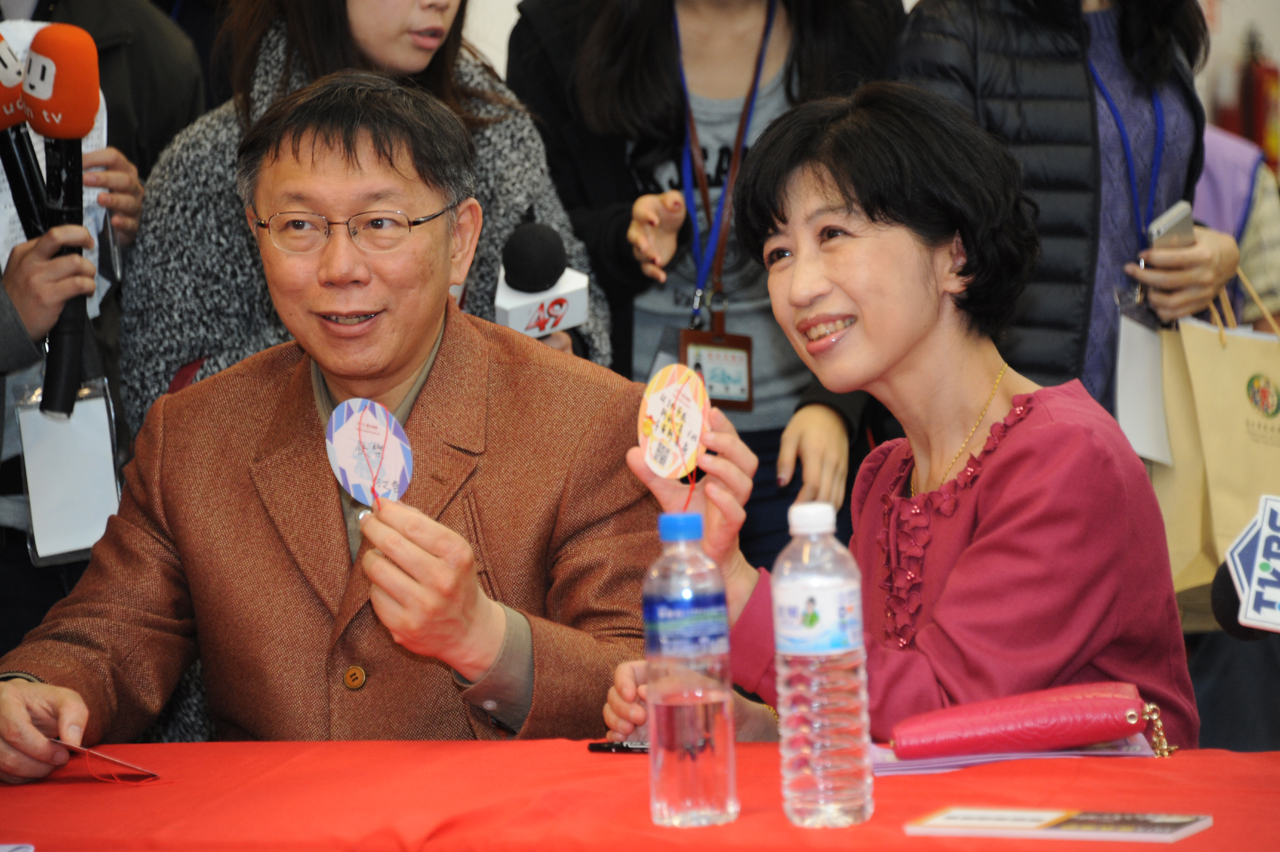
Ko with his wife, Chen Pei-chi, in 2015

Ko is married to Chen Pei-chi (陳佩琪), a pediatrician. The couple were introduced through family acquaintances while Ko was a surgical resident and Chen a pediatric resident at National Taiwan University Hospital, where their respective fathers had mutual friends. They married in 1991. Originally from Magong, Penghu, Chen studied medicine at National Taiwan University, becoming the first female graduate of her high school to enter the university's medical program. She became the head of pediatrics at Taipei City Hospital, and retired on 27 September 2024 after 36 years working there.

Ko and Chen have three children, one son and two daughters. Their son, Ko Fu-yao (柯傅堯), earned a master's degree in mechanical engineering from National Taiwan University and, in March 2026, earned his doctorate in engineering from the University of Tokyo.

Ko has described himself as possessing characteristics associated with Asperger syndrome, although he acknowledged in April 2017 that he had never received a formal medical diagnosis. In June 2014, he said that his son had been diagnosed with Asperger syndrome.

== Selected publications ==
- Hsiao, Chang-Chun; Friend, Julie R.; Wu, Florence J.; Ko, Wen-Je; Remmel, Rory P.; Hu, Wei-Shou (June 1999). "Receding Cytochrome P450 Activity in Disassembling Hepatocyte Spheroids". Tissue Engineering. 5 (3): 207–221. doi:10.1089/ten.1999.5.207. ISSN 1076-3279.

== Notes ==
Political offices
Preceded by Hau Lung-pin	Mayor of Taipei; 2014–2022	Succeeded by Chiang Wan-an
Party political offices
New office	Chairman of the Taiwan People's Party; 2019–2024	Succeeded by Huang Kuo-chang (acting)
