= Four Four West Village =

The site of Four Four West Village (四四西村), as appearing on a U.S. Taiwan Defense Command map dated presumably around 1960, indicated by roughly thirty-three darker-coloured plots in the center.

Four Four West Village, or Forty-Four West Village (sometimes partly transliterated as SiSi West Village due to its vernacular name is Chinese: 四四西村; pinyin: sì sì xi cūn) was a resident area in Taipei for the military personnel of the 44th Arsenal of Combined Logistics Command (Chinese: 聯勤第四十四兵工廠; pinyin: lián qín dì sì shí sì bīng gōng chǎng) and their dependents, completed in June 1949. Originally, it is said to have housed 300 households.

The government built the village along with Four Four East Village, after more troops were transferred to Taiwan and the capacity of Four Four South Village thus became too small. During the year of turmoil 1949, in total, more than six hundred thousand troops and two million "dependents" retreated from China to Taiwan. The majority of military residents in Four Four West Village had a rather high position in the army, as lieutenants or as field grade officers, whereas the general soldiers lived in Four Four East Village and craftsmen and civilians lived in Four Four South Village. The resident environment was considered premium and the descendants usually enjoyed a better education. Every house had a garden and a yard.

Along with the other military dependents' villages which were built to accommodate the immigrants (which consisted mostly of soldiers and their dependents) during the immigration wave across the Taiwan Strait following the retreat of the Nationalist government during the Chinese Civil War between the Kuomintang and the Chinese Communist Party, the villages were named Zhuliba (Chinese: 竹籬笆; lit. 'bamboo fences').

== Zhongtuo Community ==
A 2017 map of the residential area Zhongtuo (in red) in Taipei, with an indication of its three zones (namely 甲, 乙 and 丙).

The area is now known as the Zhongtuo Community (Chinese: 忠駝國宅; pinyin: zhōng tuo guó zhái), a public housing project, which in 1991 occupied a floor area of 4.1 hectares in Taipei's Xinyi District, encompassing parts of Keelung Road, Guangfu Road and sections of Xinyi Road.

Zhongtuo Community and Four Four West Village have been one of the subjects of a bilingual Chinese-English web project called "This is My Land" (Chinese: 走過一甲子; pinyin: zǒu guò yī jiǎzǐ), prepared by seven grade students, parent volunteers and school instructors of the Taipei Municipal Ming-Hu Junior High School (Chinese: 臺北市立明湖國民中學; pinyin: Táiběi Shìlì Mínghú Guómín Zhōngxué) starting in 2005. According to their on-site observations, no original remains of the Four Four West Village were preserved after the re-purposing of the area through the Zhongtuo public housing project, which encompassed thirty-five apartment buildings. The vernacular history of many other military dependents' villages have equally become lost through their redevelopment as public housing communities. The "This is My Land" project transliterated and translated the neighborhood's name into English as "Zhongtuo Community", "Zhongtuo Public Housing Community" or "Zhongtuo Public Housing".

The construction of the Zhongtuo Community housing blocks, which includes twelve-stories high apartments, started in 1979 and were completed in 1983. Because the military and the Taipei City Government jointly arranged the construction, residents stopped being of exclusively "military" nature. The area's third zone (Chinese: 丙區; pinyin: bǐng qū) houses the Taipei Municipal Xinyi Preschool (Chinese: 臺北市立信義幼兒園), entailing an indoor area of 1121 square meters and 831 square meters outdoors. The Taiwanese artist Ryan Kuo (zh) has been noted living in Zhongtuo Community.

== See also ==
- Four Four South Village
