= Core Pacific City =

Former shopping mall in Taipei, Taiwan

Coordinates: 25°2′53″N 121°33′44″E

- 京華城
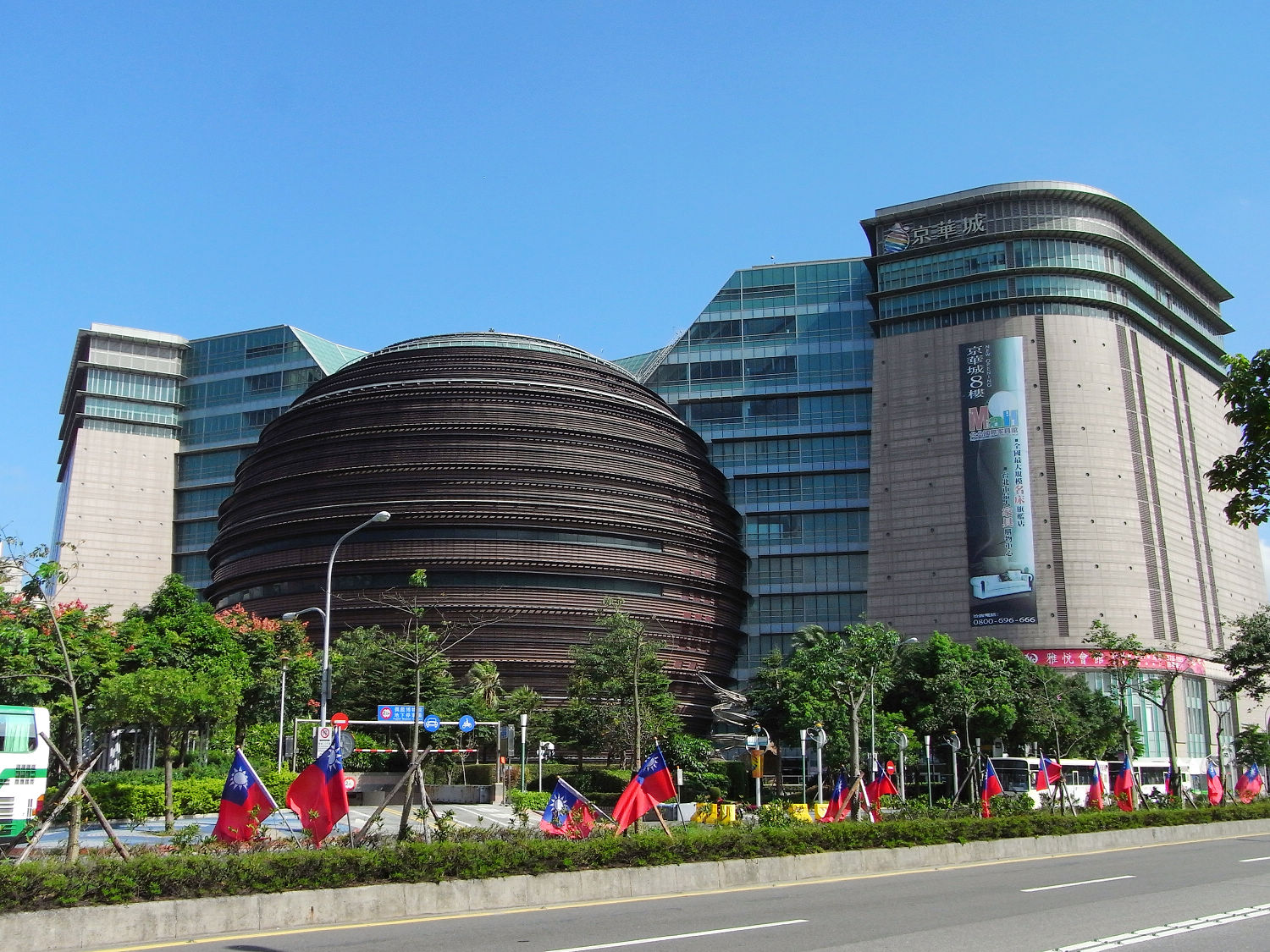
- Location: Songshan, Taipei, Taiwan
- Opened: November 2001
- Closed: 30 November 2019
- Floor area: 204,190 m^{2}
- Floors: 19
- Parking: Yes
- Public transit: Nanjing Sanmin MRT station

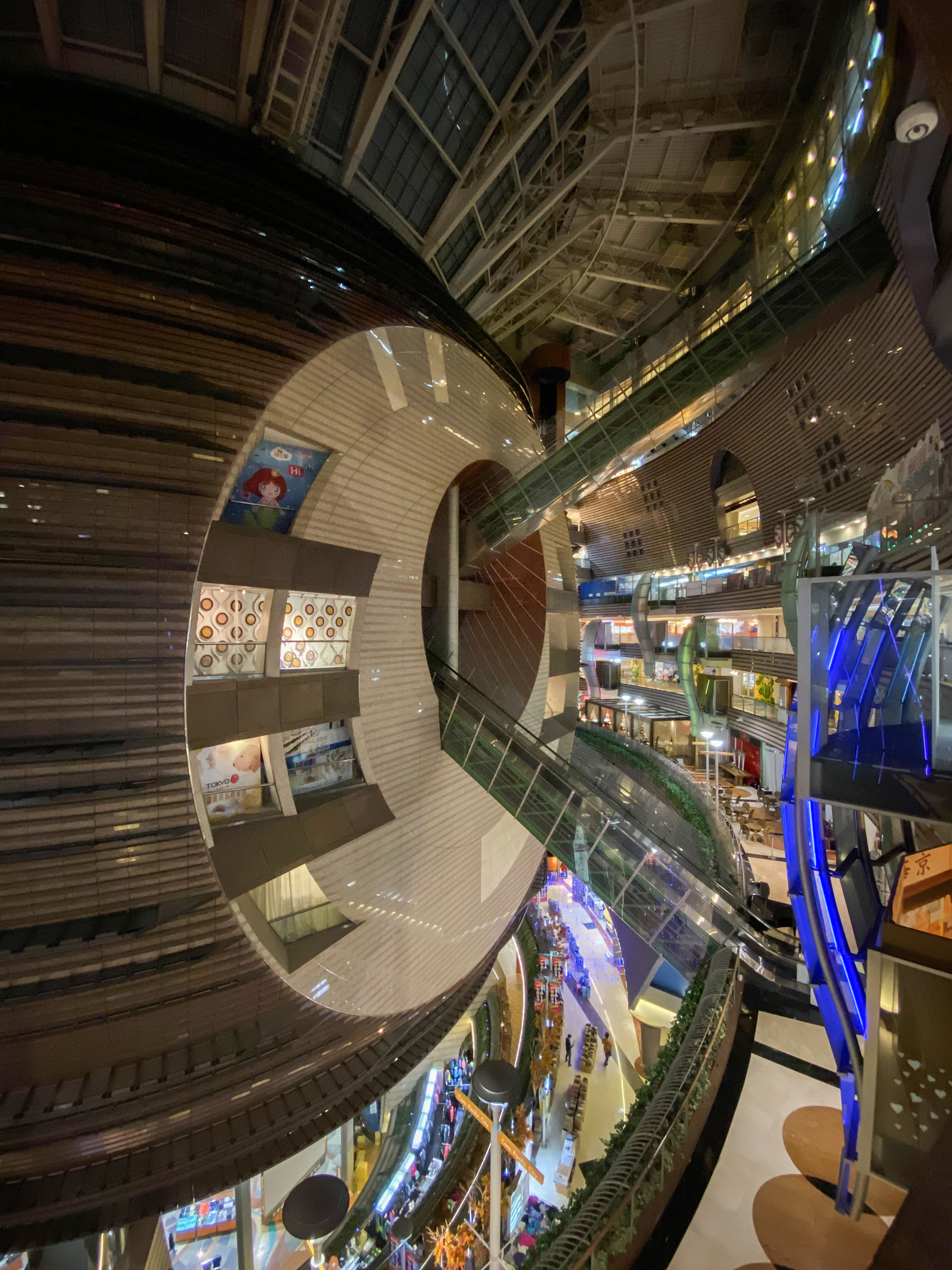
Living Mall atrium

Core Pacific City, also known as the Living Mall (Chinese: 京華城; pinyin: Jīnghuá chéng), was a shopping center in Songshan District, Taipei, Taiwan, that opened in 2001 and closed in 2019.

== History ==
Core Pacific City was built in 2001. During its development and construction, it was touted as the world's first truly 24-hour mall and Asia's first "city within a city" complex.

Before it opened, its management was fined by the Taipei City Government for failing fire safety inspections. Further fines were levied when the mall opened to the public without first obtaining an operating license. In February 2002, a fire at the mall required the evacuation of 20,000 people. It was determined to be arson, and in July 2002, former Core Pacific official Lin Chang-cheng (林長成) was convicted of the crime, along with two others, Wang Lin-kwun (王林坤) and Lin Ching-chi (林清吉). Losses were estimated at NT$12 million. The opening of Taipei 101's mall in 2003 was expected to affect the revenues of Core Pacific's tenants, though less severely than those at other malls, due to Core Pacific's lower price points. In 2004, the mall's management company was cited by Taiwan's Fair Trade Commission for unfair trade practices relating to a gift certificate promotion campaign.

In March 2018, the Core Pacific Group put up the shopping mall for auction with real estate broker Cushman & Wakefield. The auction opened to the public on 12 December 2018, with an initial price of NT$38 billion.

Core Pacific City closed on 30 November 2019 and was subsequently demolished. On its final day of operation, 100,000 people visited the mall.

In August 2024, former Taipei mayor Ko Wen-je was arrested in relation to corruption allegations surrounding the redevelopment of the land that Core Pacific had been situated on. The property was impounded, and in December, Ko was indicted on charges of bribery and corruption. He was released on bail in September 2025.

== Architecture ==
Core Pacific City had a total floor space of 204,190 m^{2}. The structure was a complex of two buildings—an L-shaped building that contained specialty boutiques, connected to a sphere that housed the Mira Department Store. The complex consisted of 12 above-ground stories and 7 underground levels. Core Pacific's total, 19-story height was attributed to Taipei's extremely expensive land costs.

The sphere, considered to be Core Pacific's most dominant and visible feature, was 11 stories tall and clad in granite imported from Finland, while the L-shaped portion featured granite from Spain. The mall's architects were the Jerde Partnership and Artech, Inc. Jerde won the 2002 Gold Nugget Special Award of Excellence at the Pacific Coast Builders Conference/Western Building Show for its work on the shopping complex. The engineering firm Arup was also recognized in 2002 for its work on the mall with a Structural Engineering Association of California Award for Excellence.
