= Yao Li-ming =

Taiwanese politician (born 1952)

- 姚立明
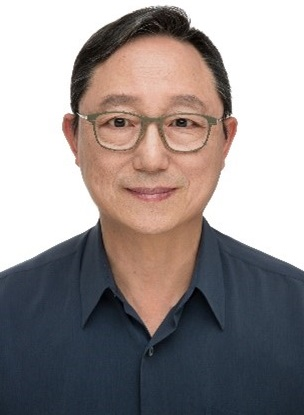
- Official portrait, 2024

Member of the Legislative Yuan
- In office 1 February 1996 – 31 January 1999
- Constituency: Kaohsiung County

Personal details
- Born: 15 January 1952 (age 74) Taipei, Taiwan
- Party: Independent
- Other political affiliations: New Party (1993–1997); Home Party (2007–2014)
- Education: Fu Jen Catholic University (LLB); Bielefeld University (LLD)

Yao Li-ming (Chinese: 姚立明; born 15 January 1952) is a Taiwanese political scientist, politician, and political commentator. He was elected to the Legislative Yuan in 1995 as a member of the New Party, then withdrew from the party before concluding his term in 1999. Yao ran for reelection in 2008, while affiliated with the Home Party and was not elected. He later worked for Ko Wen-je's 2014 Taipei mayoral campaign, and for William Lai's 2024 presidential campaign. Lai nominated Yao for an open seat on the Judicial Yuan after winning the presidency. However, the Legislative Yuan did not approve Yao's selection.

== Early life and education ==
Yao was born in Taipei on January 15, 1952, to a waishengren family. After graduating from the Affiliated Senior High School of National Taiwan Normal University, he studied law at Fu Jen Catholic University and, after obtaining his LL.B. degree, earned a Doctor of Laws (LL.D.) in Germany from Bielefeld University in 1985. His doctoral dissertation was titled, "Die materielle Verfassungsänderung - Verfassungsdurchbrechung".

== Political career ==
Prior to serving in the Third Legislative Yuan, Yao hosted a political talk show for the Public Television Service and was an adjunct instructor at National Sun Yat-sen University.

=== Legislative Yuan ===
Yao represented Kaohsiung County in the Legislative Yuan from 1996 to 1999. After Yao withdrew from the New Party during his legislative term, he remained in office as a political independent.

=== Political media and campaign operative ===
Subsequently, Lin joined the Chinese Culture University faculty as a political scientist and professor of administrative management. Aside from academia, Yao resumed his media career as a political commentator. Later, Yao served as secretary-general of the Home Party, and was ranked second on the Home Party party list for the January 2008 legislative elections, but was not elected to the Legislative Yuan. He was also on the board of the Congress Watch Foundation. He later became chairman of the Congress Watch Foundation. Yao and former legislative colleague Chien Ta led a commemoration of the 1989 Tiananmen Square protests and massacre held at Chiang Kai-shek Memorial Hall in June 2009. Yao was a founding board member of the Thinking Taiwan Foundation, established by Tsai Ing-wen in 2012. Independent mayoral candidate Ko Wen-je offered Yao the position of campaign director before the 2014 Taipei mayoral election, which Yao accepted. In his role as campaign manager, Yao filed a lawsuit against Luo Shu-lei for defamation, as Lo had claimed that Ko was involved in corruption, tax evasion, and money laundering while working as a physician at National Taiwan University Hospital. Ko's campaign later alleged that opposing candidate Sean Lien's campaign had wiretapped Ko's campaign office. In response, Lien's campaign manager Alex Tsai filed a lawsuit against Yao and other members of Ko's campaign staff. After Ko won the Taipei mayoralty, Yao again returned to political commentary. Yao later appeared alongside Ko in a February 2015 rally organized to support Tsai's recall as a legislator. Prior to the 2018 Taipei City Council election, Yao opined that there were many swing voters in Taipei, negating the city as a Kuomintang stronghold. Yao Li-ming split with Ko, and offered his support and services as a campaign manager to Pasuya Yao instead. During the 2024 Taiwanese presidential election cycle, Yao worked for William Lai's campaign.

=== Unsuccessful Judicial Yuan appointment ===
In August 2024, Lai appointed Yao Vice President of the Judicial Yuan. However, legislative confirmation hearings for seven Judicial Yuan positions were delayed. Hearings eventually began on 2 December, but left the Judicial Yuan with the lowest number of justices since the introduction of judicial interpretation in 1947. The Legislative Yuan voted to reject Yao's nomination, and that of six others to the Judicial Yuan, on 24 December 2024. Days before deciding on Lai's nominees, legislators had voted to require the Judicial Yuan have ten active judges before hearing a case.
