= Taipei City Hall =

Government building in Taipei, Taiwan

Coordinates: 25°2′15″N 121°33′52″E

Taipei City Hall 臺北市市政大樓
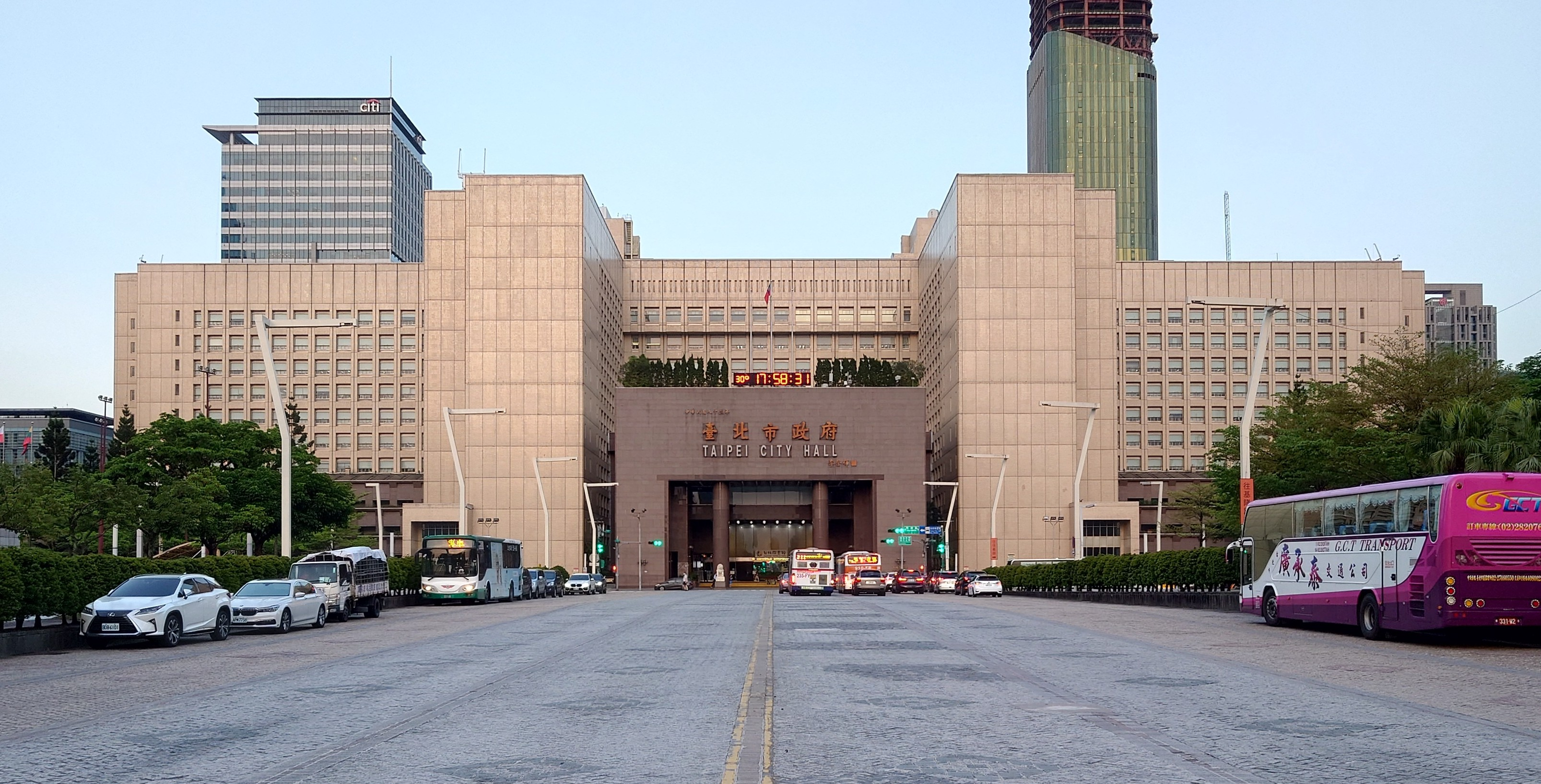
- City Hall front view in April 2023
- Interactive map of the Taipei City Hall 臺北市市政大樓 area

General information
- Status: Completed
- Location: Xinyi, Taipei, Taiwan
- Construction started: June 6, 1986
- Completed: 1994
- Owner: Taipei City Government

Height
- Roof: 54.42 m (178.5 ft)

Technical details
- Floor count: 12
- Floor area: 196,684 m^{2} (2,117,090 ft^{2})

Taipei City Hall (Chinese: 臺北市市政大樓), the seat of Taipei City government, is located at Xinyi Special District, Xinyi District, Taipei, Taiwan.

== Architecture ==
Taipei City Hall is a 12-story building, with two stories below ground. It is 54.42 metres (178.5 ft) tall and has a floor area of 196,684.59 square metres (2,117,095.3 ft^{2}), capable of accommodating 6,000 employees. The building also often houses exhibitions, performances, speeches, and other public events.

From above, the building is shaped like a "double ten" (十十); the word ten is shaped like a cross in written Chinese (十). The architects chose this shape to get around informal height restrictions and to offer sunlight and good air circulation. It is also a reference to the National Day of the Republic of China, which is October 10, also known as “Double Ten Day.”

== History ==
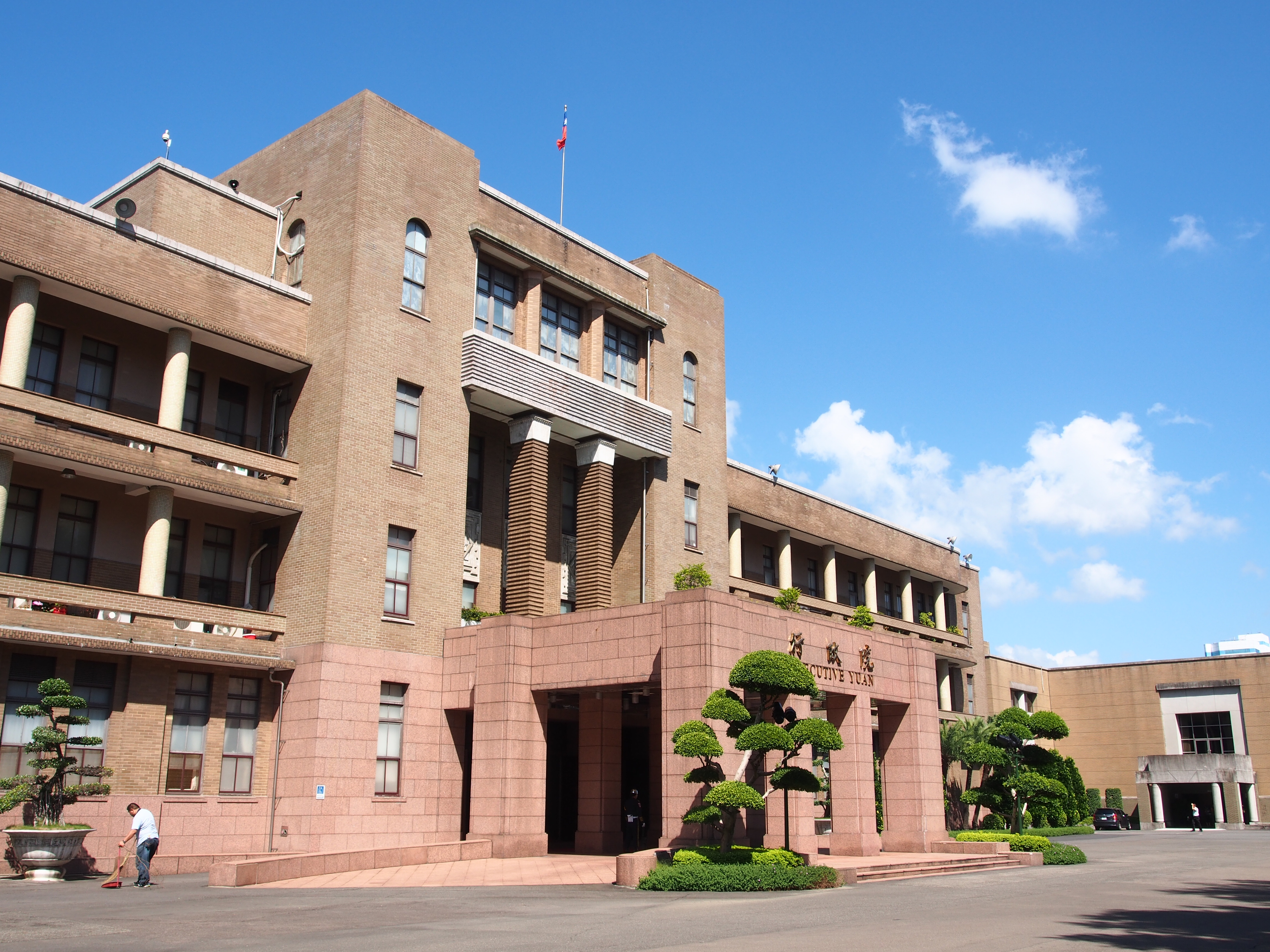
Taipei City Hall from 1940 to 1945 (now the Executive Yuan building)

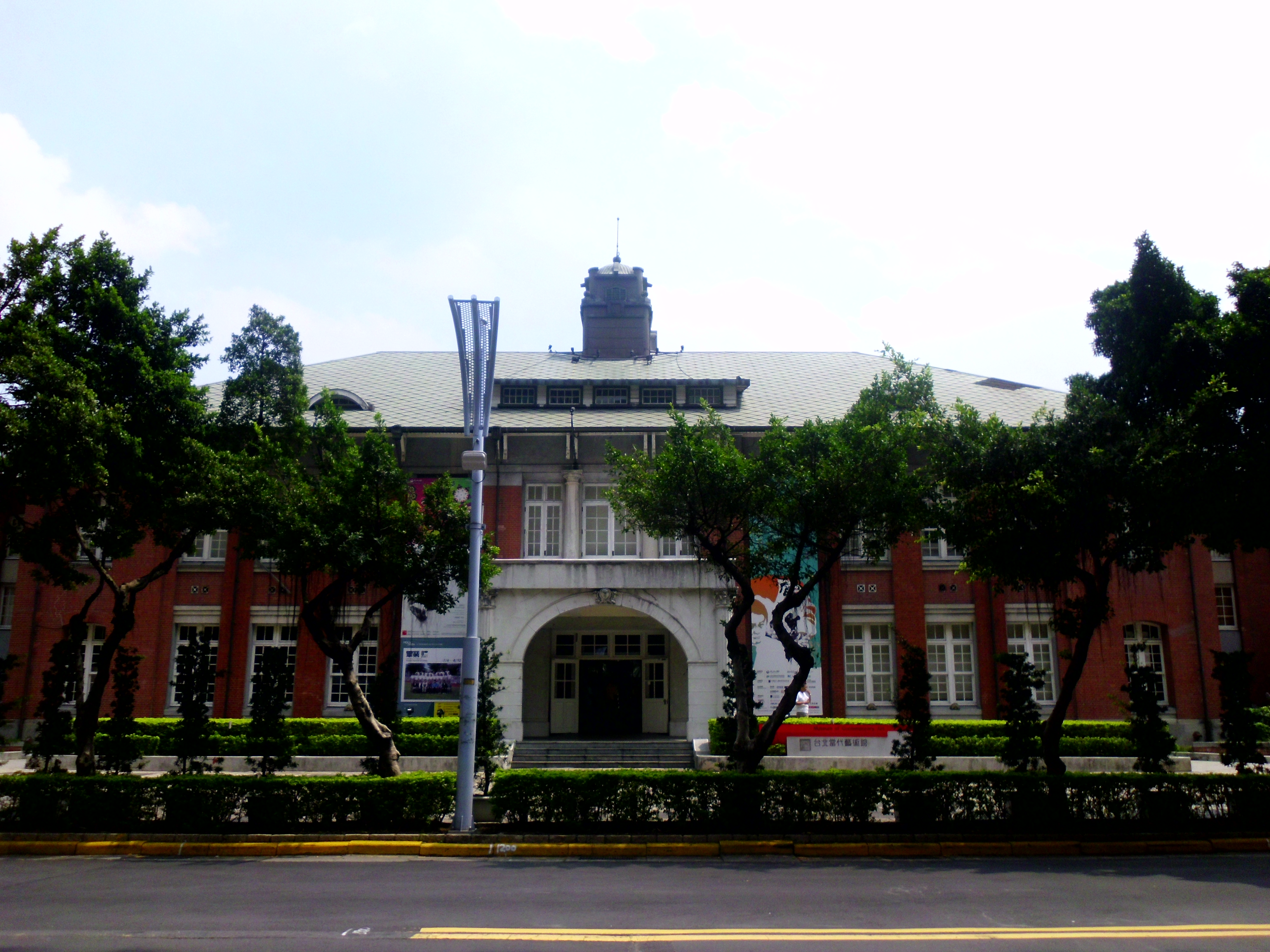
Taipei City Hall from 1945 to 1993 (now the Museum of Contemporary Art Taipei and Jian Cheng Junior High School)

Taipei city government was first established in 1920 during Japanese rule. It was initially housed in buildings belonging to Huashan Elementary School. To handle the city's growth, a new city hall was opened in 1940 on the same site. It was three- to four-stories tall and built in a modernist style.

When Taiwan was taken over by the Republic of China in 1945, Taipei's city hall was moved to the former campus of Jian Cheng Elementary School. (The old city hall building eventually became the Executive Yuan building.) As Taipei grew, its city hall could only accommodate around 1,000 employees, and many other units were scattered in various rented offices. To address this problem, a new city hall was opened in 1994 in the Xinyi District. The old city hall building became the Museum of Contemporary Art Taipei and the campus of Jian Cheng Junior High School.

== Access ==
- Bannan line: Taipei City Hall Station
- Taipei City Hall Bus Station

== See also ==
- Taipei
  - Taipei City Government
  - Mayor of Taipei
  - Taipei City Council
- New Taipei City Hall
