= Huannan Market =

Market in Wanhua, Taipei, Taiwan

Huannan Market 環南綜合市場
- Location: Wanhua, Taipei, Taiwan; 25°01′43.2″N 121°29′23.4″E
- Opening date: 25 July 2020
- Architect: marketplace
- Number of tenants: 1,059
- Parking: 740
- Interactive map of Huannan Market

The Huannan Market (traditional Chinese: 環南綜合市場; simplified Chinese: 环南综合市场; pinyin: Huánnán Zònghé Shìchǎng) is a marketplace in Wanhua District, Taipei, Taiwan.

== History ==
The discussion on the construction of the new building of Huannan Market started in 1999 to rebuild the old market building on the site. In 2008, the Taipei City Government had briefing sessions with the market vendors to inform on the reconstruction planning of the market. The construction of the new market building started on 6 November 2016 in a ceremony preceded by Taipei Mayor Ko Wen-je with a cost of NT$5.5 billion. After the completion of the first phase of the construction, the market was opened under trial operation on 12 February 2020. The market was finally fully opened on 25 July 2020.

On 2 July 2021, the market was closed down due to 41 of its vendors tested for COVID-19. The closure takes effect until 5 July 2021. The Central Epidemic Command Center and the city government then set up a joint command post at the market. President Tsai Ing-wen gave five measures to contain the outbreak, which are onsite polymerase chain reaction testing for the vendors, SMS alert to those who had visited the market recently prior to the emerging of the pandemic, contact tracing, quarantine for close contacts of the infected and more testing to the people around the area.

== Architecture ==
The market is the biggest traditional market in Taipei. The market building consists of two floors underground and six floors above ground, housing 1,059 vendors and 14,000 workers. The first floor houses the fruits, vegetables, clams and cold side dishes. The second floor houses the meat, fish, cooked food and groceries. It has 740 parking lots located on the 4th, 5th and 6th floor.

== Transportation ==
The market is accessible within walking distance southwest of Longshan Temple Station of Taipei Metro.

== See also ==
- List of tourist attractions in Taipei
