= Museum of Contemporary Art Taipei =

Museum in Datong, Taipei, Taiwan

- 台北當代藝術館
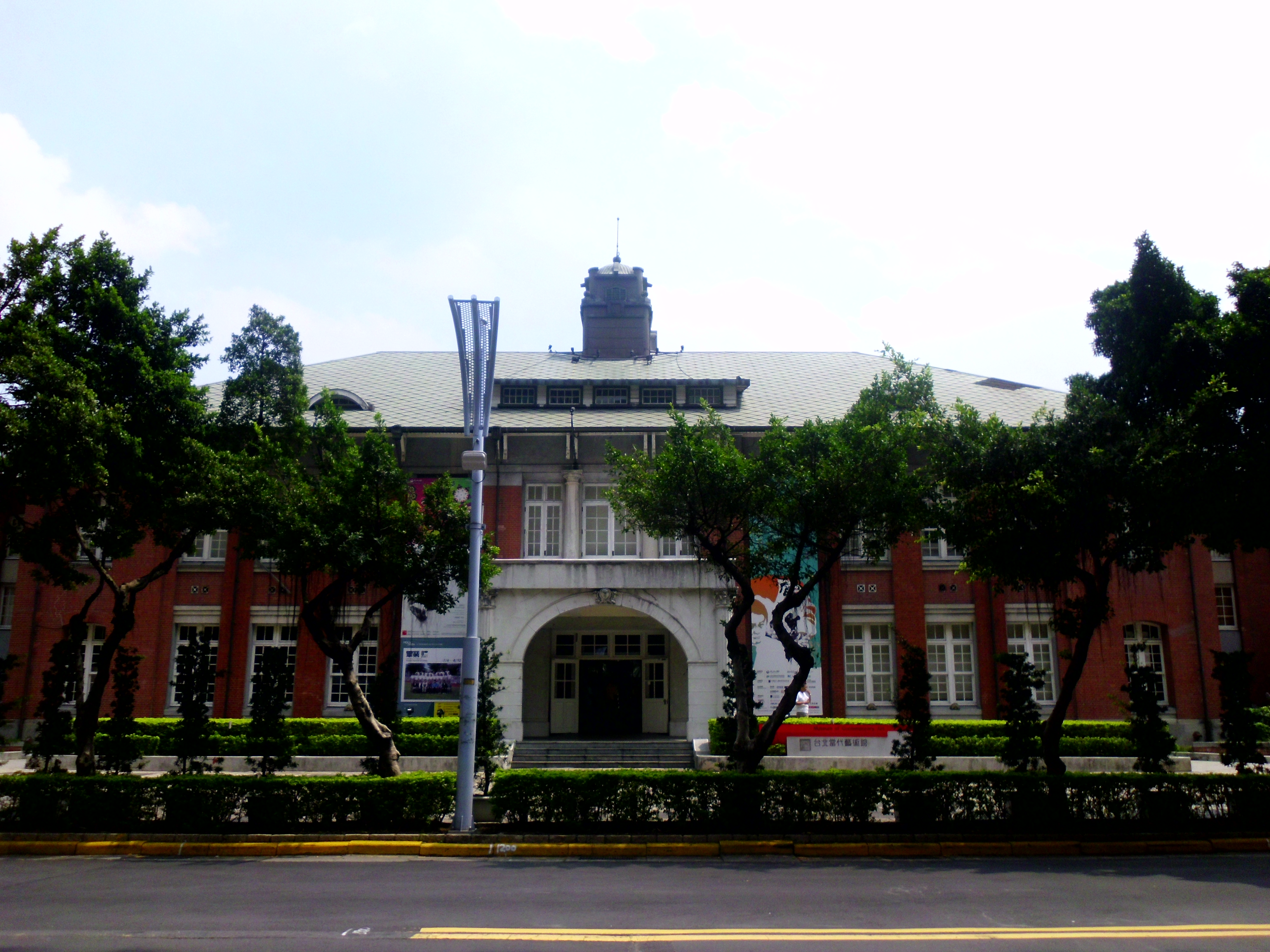
- Established: 27 May 2001
- Location: 39 Chang'an West Road, Datong, Taipei, Taiwan
- Coordinates: 25°03′02″N 121°31′07″E
- Type: Museum
- Website: Official website

The Museum of Contemporary Art Taipei (MoCA Taipei; traditional Chinese: 台北當代藝術館; simplified Chinese: 台北当代艺术馆; pinyin: Táiběi Dāngdài Yìshùguǎn) is a museum of contemporary art, located in Datong District, Taipei, Taiwan.

== History ==
The museum building was built during the Japanese rule in 1921 for what became Kensei Elementary School. After the handover of Taiwan from Japan to the Republic of China, in 1945 it hosted the Taipei City Government and became an important landmark, thanks to its highly recognizable symmetrical building and belltower in historic style.

After the city government moved to a new location in the Xinyi District in 1993, it was designated as a historical building and underwent renovations along with Jian Cheng Junior High School. The Museum of Contemporary Art, Taipei opened on 27 May 2001 within the building, the first museum in Taiwan to be dedicated exclusively to contemporary art. The rest of the building is occupied by Jian Cheng Junior High School.

== Exhibitions ==
While showcasing mainly contemporary Taiwanese art, under director Shih Jui-jen its activities have become increasingly international. In 2009, it organized a solo show of Taiwanese artist Yang Maolin as a pavilion at the Venice Biennale. In 2009 and 2010 it collaborated with MoCA Shanghai, Today Art Museum Beijing, and Guangdong Museum of Art in the organization of the Animamix Biennial. Director Loh Li-chen (2019-2025) continued a focus on international connections and exhibitions, alongside local artists and young talent. MoCA Taipei became a presenting partner of the Han Nefkens Foundation, presenting works of its awardees. In 2023, post the COVID pandemic, she presented NEXUS, the first-ever exhibition in Taiwan to focus exclusively on work by artists living and working in the Caribbean, from May 5 to July 16, 2023, and secured the first stop of the international touring exhibition of 'Love is in the Bin' by Banksy (authorized by Pest Office) reputed as one of the most iconic contemporary artworks of the 21st century, on view at the Museum of Contemporary Art (MoCA), Taipei, from July 1 to August 13, 2023, before the work going into the world.

== Transportation ==
The museum is accessible within walking distance South West from Zhongshan Station of the Taipei Metro.

== See also ==
- List of museums in Taiwan
