= Teng Chia-chi =

Politician from Taiwan

- 鄧家基
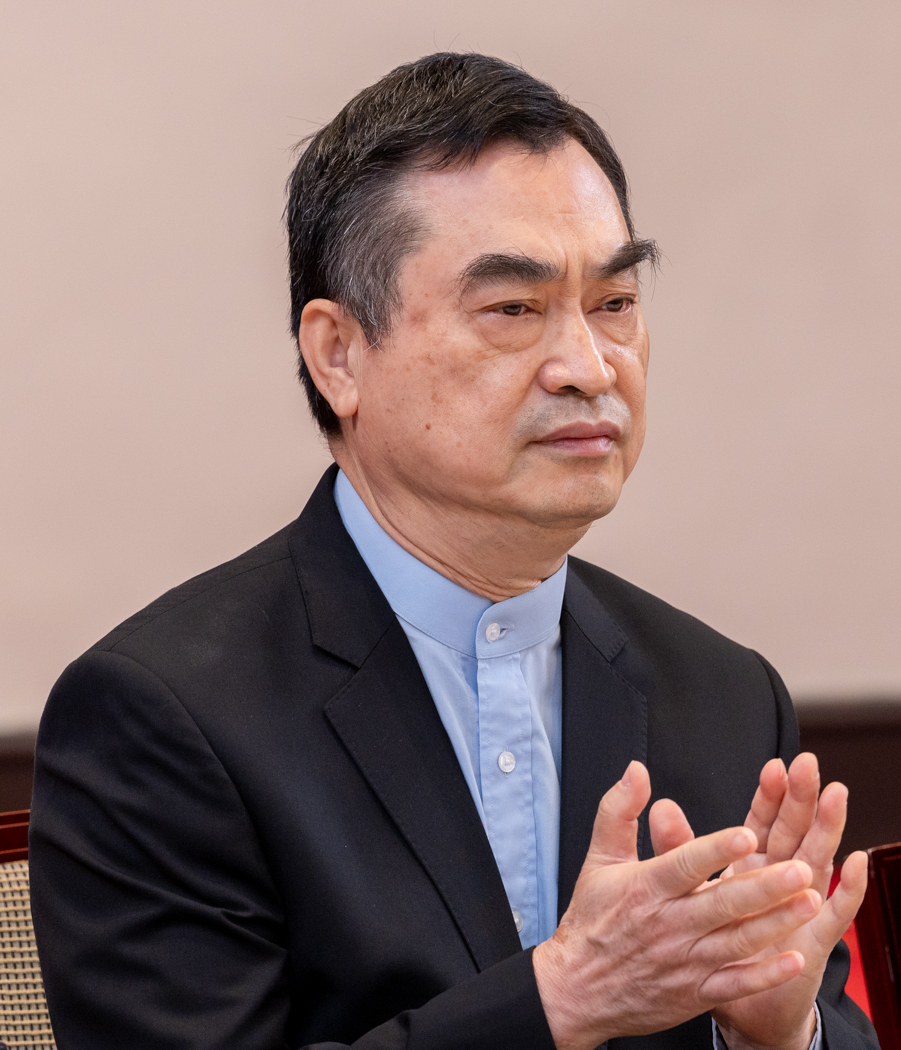

Member of the Examination Yuan
- Incumbent
- Assumed office 20 December 2024
- Nominated by: Lai Ching-te
- President: Chou Hung-hsien

Deputy Mayor of Taipei
- In office 25 December 2014 – 15 October 2019
- Mayor: Ko Wen-je
- Preceded by: Timothy Ting
- Succeeded by: Huang Shan-shan

Taipei City Councillor
- In office 25 December 1994 – 25 December 2002

Personal details
- Born: 24 May 1956 (age 69) Keelung, Taiwan
- Party: People First Party
- Education: National Cheng Kung University (BS, MS); University of California, Los Angeles (MS, PhD)

Teng Chia-chi (traditional Chinese: 鄧家基; simplified Chinese: 邓家基; pinyin: Dèng Jiājī; born 24 May 1956) is a Taiwanese politician who served as a member of the Examination Yuan since 2024.

== Early life and education ==
Teng was born in Keelung on May 24, 1956. He was the second child in a family of four children. He graduated from National Cheng Kung University with a bachelor's degree in civil engineering in 1978 and a master's degree in environmental engineering in 1980. He then completed doctoral studies in the United States, earning an M.S. and a Ph.D. from the University of California, Los Angeles.

== Political career ==
From 25 December 2014 to 15 October 2019, Teng served as the deputy mayor of the Taipei City Government during the first tenure of Ko Wen-je.

On 31 May 2024, President Lai Ching-te nominated Teng as a new member of the Examination Yuan. His nomination was approved by the Legislative Yuan with 112 votes, he inaugurated on the December of the same year.
