= Four Four South Village =

Area of Taipei, Taiwan

Four Four South Village 四四南村
- Military dependents' village
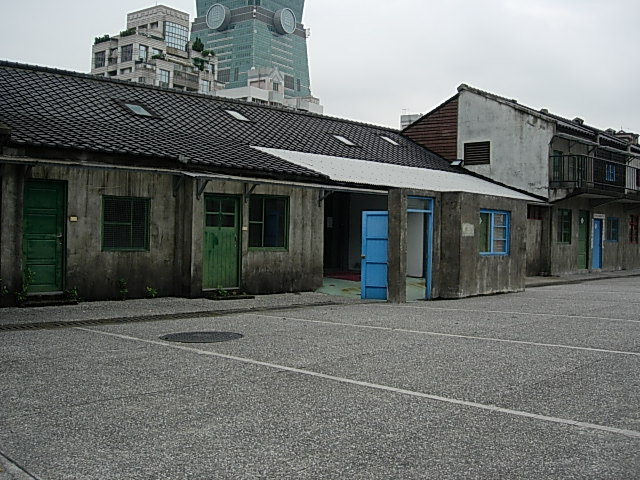
- Interactive map of Four Four South Village
- Coordinates: 25.0313°N 121.5619°E
- Country: Taiwan
- City: Taipei

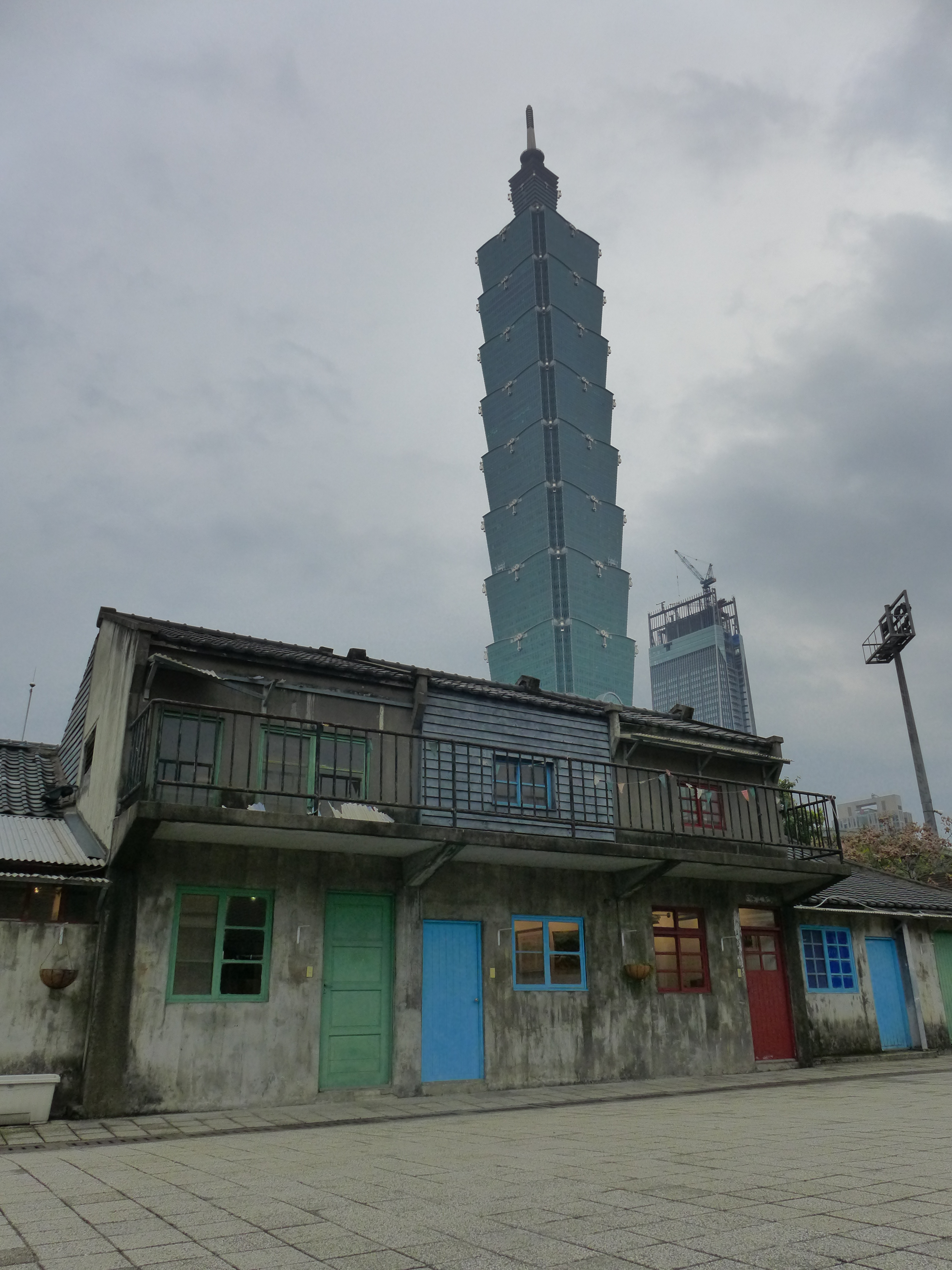
Remnant buildings of Four Four South Village at 9 March 2017, showing Taipei 101 with a new skyscraper being built to its right.

Four Four South Village, or Forty-Four South Village, Sisinan Village (Chinese: 四四南村; pinyin: sì sì nán cūn) was previously a residential area in Taipei for the military personnel of the 44th Arsenal of the Combined Logistics Command (Chinese: 聯勤第四十四兵工廠; pinyin: lián qín dì sì shí sì bīng gōng chǎng) and their dependents. Today it has been partially renovated and is home to model homes from its original use, cultural and creative stores, a restaurant, and occasional arts and crafts markets.

== See also ==
- Four Four West Village
- Xinyi District, Taipei
- Xinyi Planning District
- Taipei 101
- Taipei 101/World Trade Center metro station
