= Taipei City Government =

Municipal government in Taiwan

- 臺北市政府 (Note: In local languages: Traditional Chinese script: 臺北市政府; Mandarin Pinyin: Táiběi shì zhèngfǔ; Hokkien: Tâi-pak chhī chèng-hú; Sixian Hakka: Thòi-pet-sṳ chṳn-fú)

Agency overview
- Formed: October 10, 1920; 105 years ago
- Jurisdiction: Taipei City
- Headquarters: Taipei City Hall, Xinyi District; 25.0375°N 121.5638°E
- Agency executives: Mayor, Chiang Wan-an; Deputy Mayors, Lee Shu-chuan, Lin Yi-hua
- Website: english.gov.taipei

The Taipei City Government { is the municipal government of Taipei.

== History ==
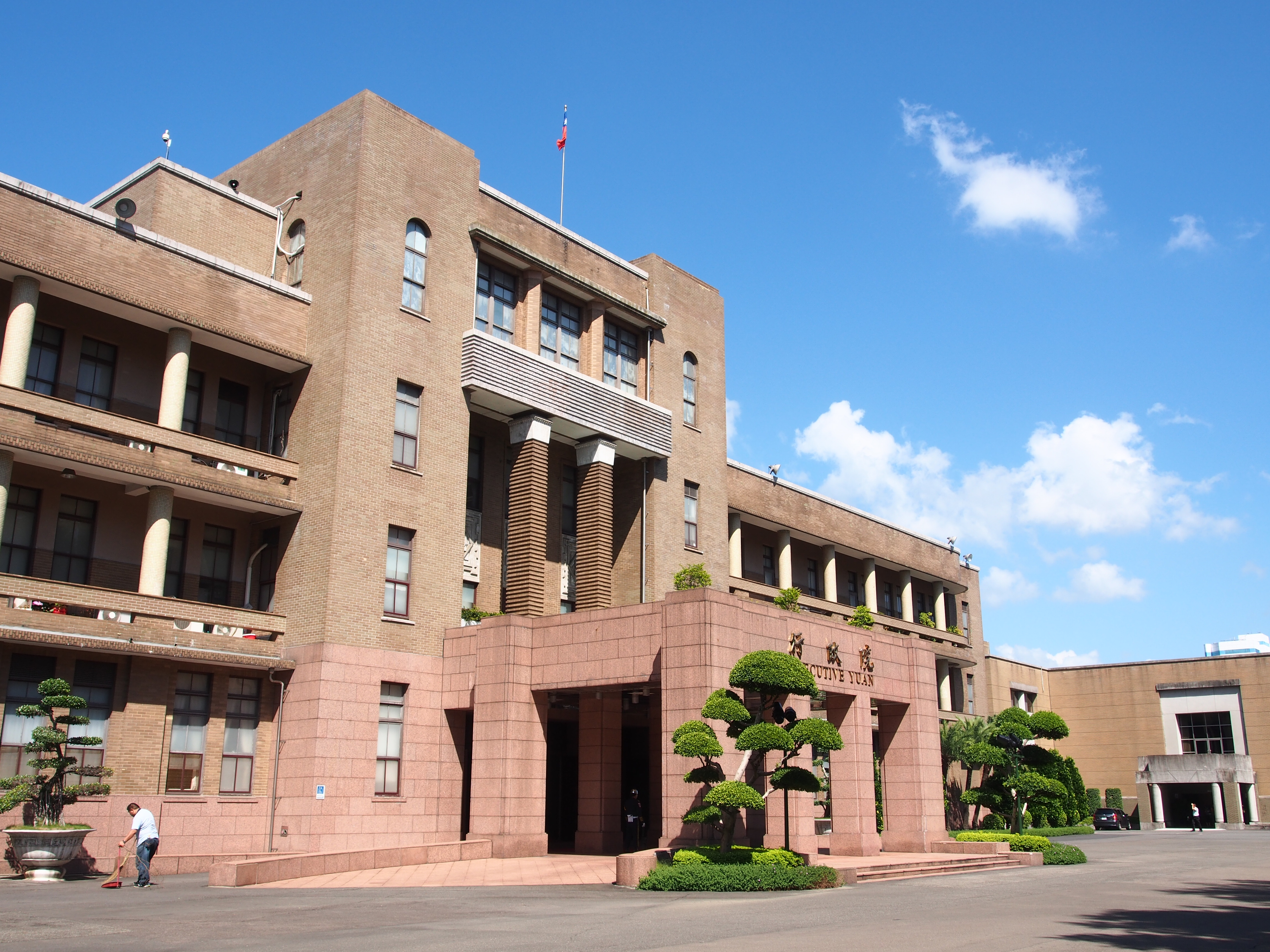
Taipei City Hall from 1940 to 1945 (now the Executive Yuan building)

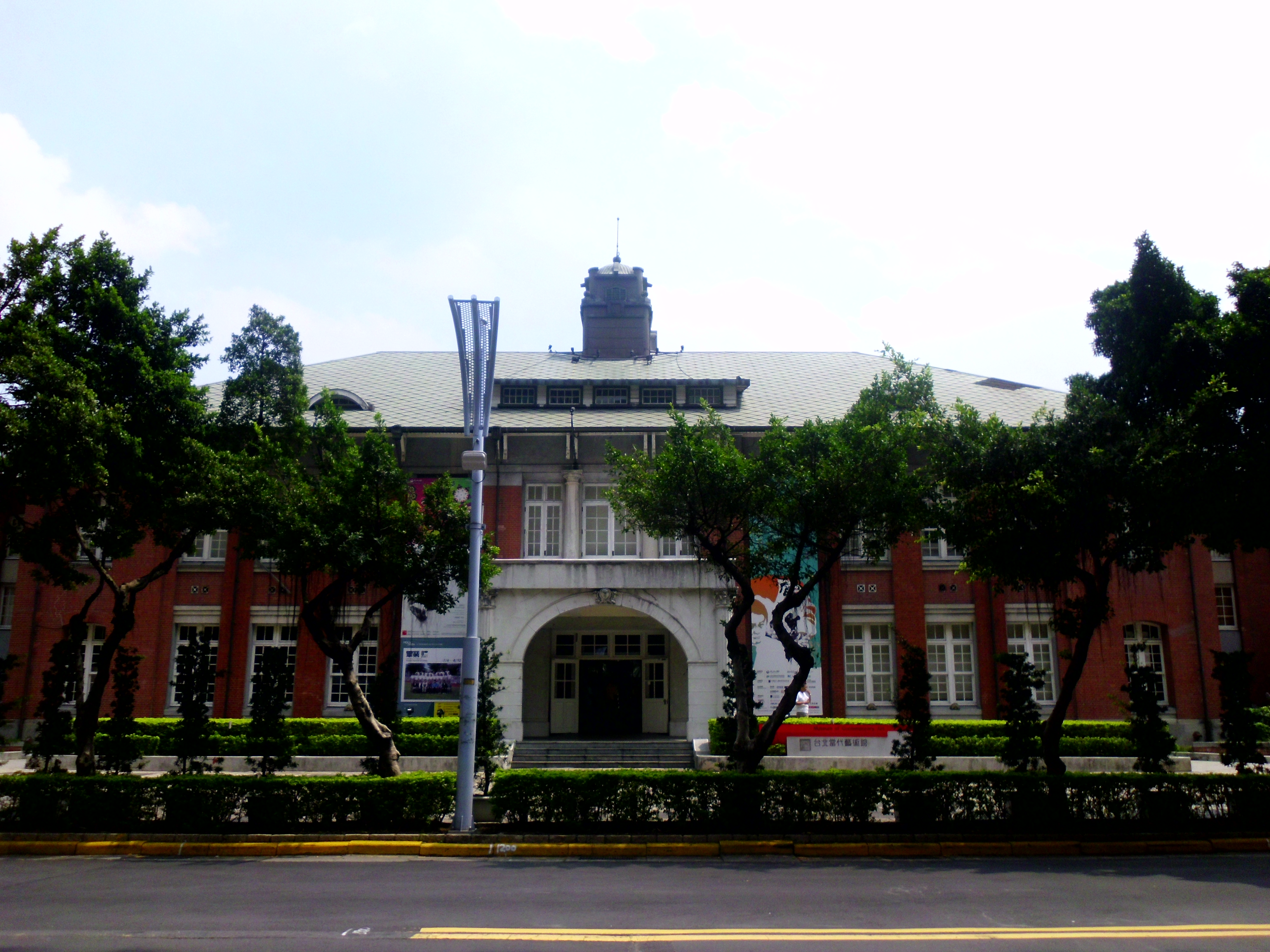
Taipei City Hall from 1945 to 1993 (now the Museum of Contemporary Art Taipei and Jian Cheng Junior High School)

Taipei was known as Taihoku during Japan's rule of Taiwan, which started in 1895. Initially, the city was directly controlled by the Governor-General of Taiwan. In 1920, Japan reorganized the system of local government in Taiwan. As part of this, the Taihoku City Government was established within Taihoku Prefecture.

The city government was initially housed in buildings belonging to Huashan Elementary School. In 1940, a new city hall was opened on the same site. It was three- to four-stories tall and built in a modernist style.

After Taiwan was handed over to the Republic of China on 25 October 1945, Taipei became a provincial municipality and the capital of Taiwan Province. Its city hall was established in the former campus of Jian Cheng Elementary School. The old city hall building was turned over to house the provincial government for Taiwan. It became the Executive Yuan building in 1957.

The Republic of China government was forced to retreat to Taiwan in 1949, and Taipei became the nation's seat of government. In 1967, Taipei's status was upgraded to a cabinet-level municipality. Its service thus grew much bigger with the large increase of population. Taipei's city hall could only accommodate around 1,000 employees, and many other units were scattered in various rented offices.

In order to carry the city government jobs effectively, a new Taipei City Hall was opened in 1994 in the Xinyi District. The old city hall building became the Museum of Contemporary Art Taipei and the campus of Jian Cheng Junior High School.

== Administration ==
There are 5 internal administrative branches, 22 departments, 7 offices, 4 committees, and 2 public corporations, under the head of the city, the mayor of Taipei and the vice mayor.

=== Departments ===
- Civil Affairs
- Cultural Affairs
- Economic Development
- Education
- Environmental Protection
- Feitsui Reservoir Administration
- Finance
- Fire Department
- Health
- Information and Tourism
- Information Technology
- Labour
- Land
- Legal Affairs
- Military Service
- Police
- Public Works
- Rapid Transit System
- Social Welfare
- Sports
- Transportation
- Urban Development

=== Administration ===
- Department of Civil Servant Development
- Department of Budget
- Department of Government Ethics
- Department of Personnel
- Secretariat

=== Commissions ===
- Research, Development and Evaluation Commission
- Urban Planning Commission
- Indigenous Peoples Commission
- Hakka Affairs Commission

=== Public Corporations ===
- Taipei Water Department
- Taipei Rapid Transit Corporation

== Access ==
Taipei City Hall is accessible within walking distance South of Taipei City Hall Station of Taipei Metro.

== See also ==
- Taipei
- Taipei City Council
