= Wanhua railway station =

Railway station in Taipei, Taiwan

Wanhua 萬華
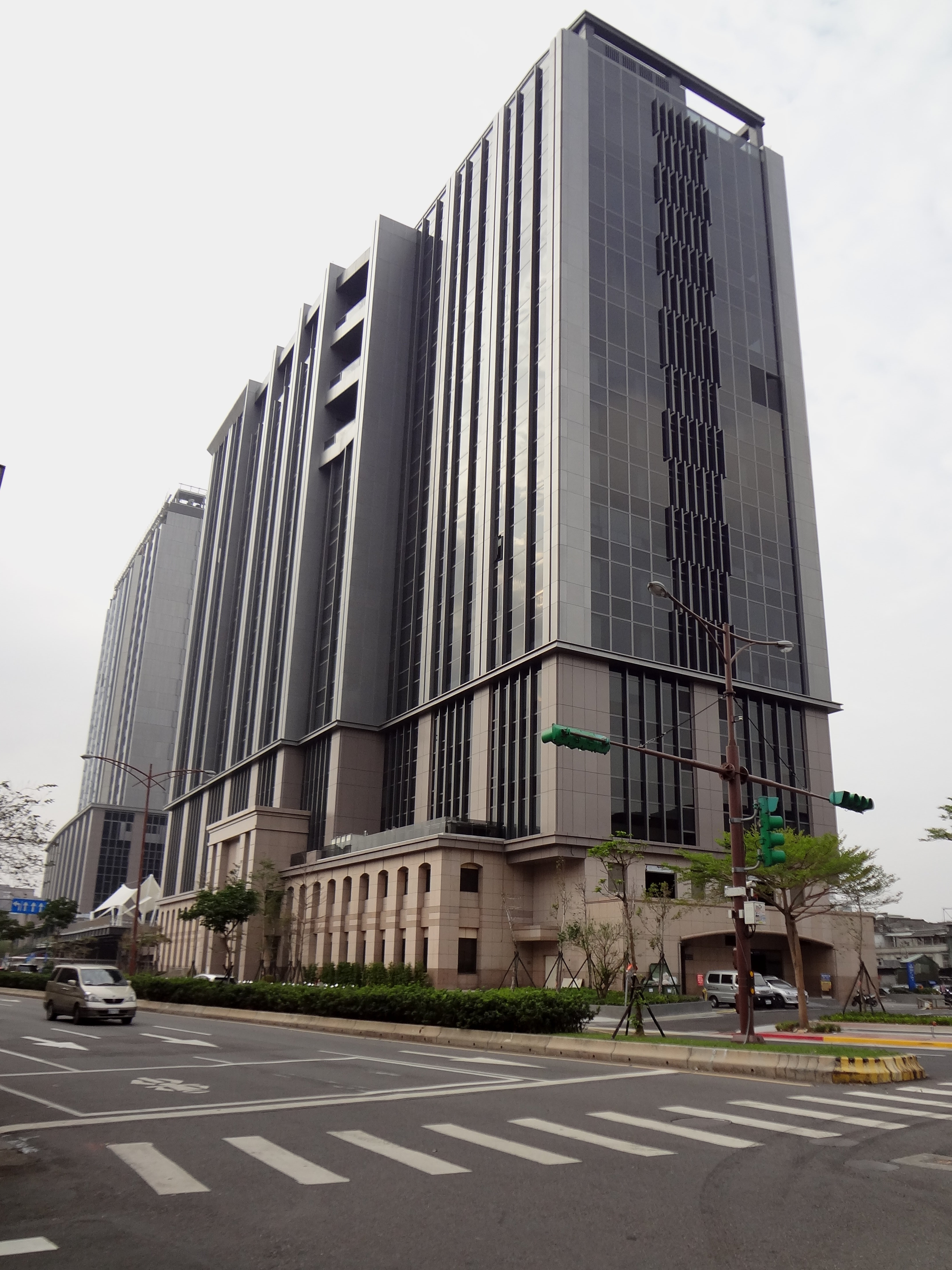

General information
- Location: 382 Kangding Rd; Wanhua, Taipei; Taiwan
- Coordinates: 25°02′00″N 121°30′01″E
- Operated by: Taiwan Railway Corporation
- Line: Western Trunk line (101)
- Distance: 31.1 km from Keelung
- Connections: 200 m: Bannan line (BL10 Longshan Temple)

Construction
- Structure type: Underground

Other information
- Classification: 一等站 (Taiwan Railways Administration level)

History
- Opened: 25 August 1901
- Previous names: Bangka Station (艋舺站)

Passengers
- 9,990 daily (2024)

Services
Preceding station	Taiwan Railway	Following station
Taipei towards Keelung	Western Trunk line	Banqiao towards Kaohsiung
Preceding station	Taipei Metro	Following station
Jiangzicui towards Dingpu	Bannan line transfer at Longshan Temple	Ximen towards Nangang Exhib Center
Location

Wanhua (Chinese: 萬華車站; pinyin: Wànhuá Chēzhàn) is a station in Wanhua District, Taipei, Taiwan, served by Taiwan Railway.

== Overview ==
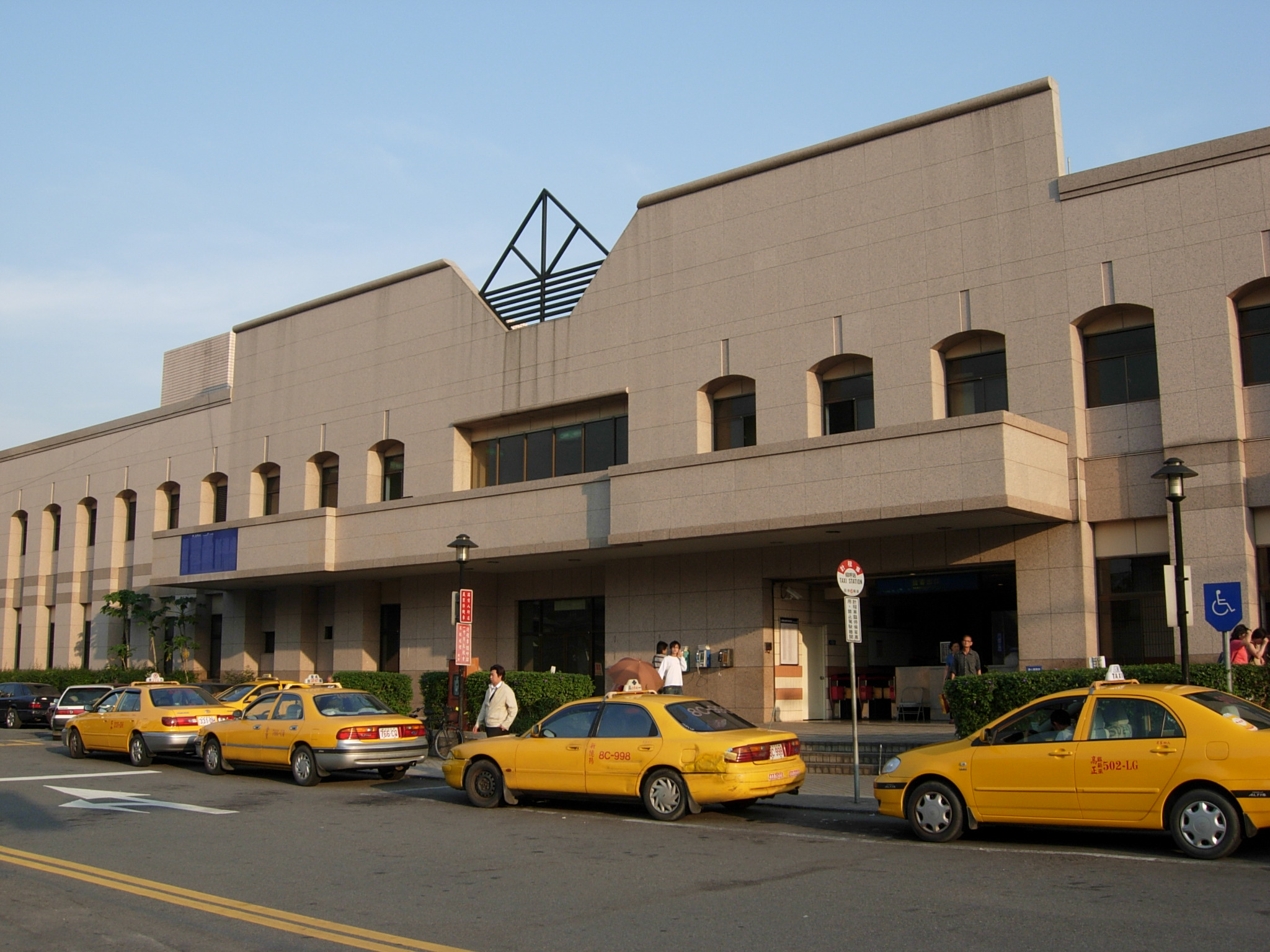
The former Wanhua Station building

The station is divided into east and west buildings. The station entrance, lobby, and ticket counters are located in the west building. The station exit, parcel center, and offices are located in the east building. The station is equipped with one island platform and one side platform, both underground.

== History ==
- 25 August 1901: The station opened as "Bangkah Station" (Japanese: 艋舺停車場). It was located at the intersection of modern-day Zhonghua Rd. and Aiguo W. Rd.
- 1 July 1918: The station was moved west to its current location.
- 1920: The station's name was changed to Banka Station (萬華驛).
- 22 January 1921: This became a terminus with the opening of the Shinten (Xindian) railway line from Banka (Wanhua) to Kōkan Station (公館) (Gongguan).
- 24 March 1954: The Xindian line ceased operations.
- 19 September 1988: As part of the Wanban Project (萬板專案) construction, the station front was changed.
- 21 July 1999: After the tracks were moved underground as part of the Taipei Railway Underground Project, the new east and west buildings began service.

== Platform configuration ==
1	1	■ West Coast line (northbound)	toward Taipei, Songshan, Qidu, Keelung
1	1	■ West Coast line (cross-line southbound)	toward Hualien, Taitung
2	2A	■ West Coast line (northbound) north/southbound cargo trains	toward Taipei, Songshan, Qidu, Keelung
2	2A	■ West Coast line (cross-line southbound) cross-line north/southbound cargo trains	toward Hualien, Taitung
2	2A	■ West Coast line (northbound track)	Through service
2	2A	■ West Coast line (southbound track)	toward Taichung, Tainan, Kaohsiung, Pingtung
3	2B	■ West Coast line (southbound)	toward Taichung, Tainan, Kaohsiung, Pingtung

== Around the station ==
Night markets

- Meng Xia Night Market (400 m to the northwest)
- Guangzhou Street Night Market (600 m to the northwest)
- Snake Alley (750 m to the northwest)
- Zhixing Market (700 m to the north)
- Shuang He Market (750 m to the south)
- Bangka Old Street (850 m to the north)
- Nanjichang Night Market (1 km to the southeast)
- Fuxing Xiyuan Shopping District (1.1 km to the southwest)

Parks

- Mengjia Park (450 m to the north)
- Laosong Park (650 m to the northeast)
- Taipei Botanical Garden (1 km to the southeast)
- Youth Park (1.2 km to the southeast)
- The Red House (1.4 km to the northeast)
- Shuangyuan Riverside Park (1.5 km to the west)

Metro stations

- Taipei Metro Longshan Temple Station (300 m to the north)
- Taipei Metro Xiaonanmen Station (1.2 km to the northeast)

Temples

- Bangka Lungshan Temple (450 m to the north)

Schools

- Mengjia Junior High School (600 m to the south)
- Xiyuan Elementary School (1 km to the south)
- Shuangyuan Elementary School (450 m to the southwest)

Historical sites

- Nanhai Academy (1.4 km to the southeast)
- Wanhua Lin Mansion (200 m to the west)
- Bopiliao Historic Block (500 m to the northeast)
- Nishi Honganji Relics (1.3 km to the northeast)

Government offices

- Wanhua District Administrative Center (100 m to the north)

== See also ==
- List of railway stations in Taiwan
