= Qing Shan King Sacrificial Ceremony =

Taiwanese religious festival

Qing Shan King Sacrificial Ceremony 青山王祭
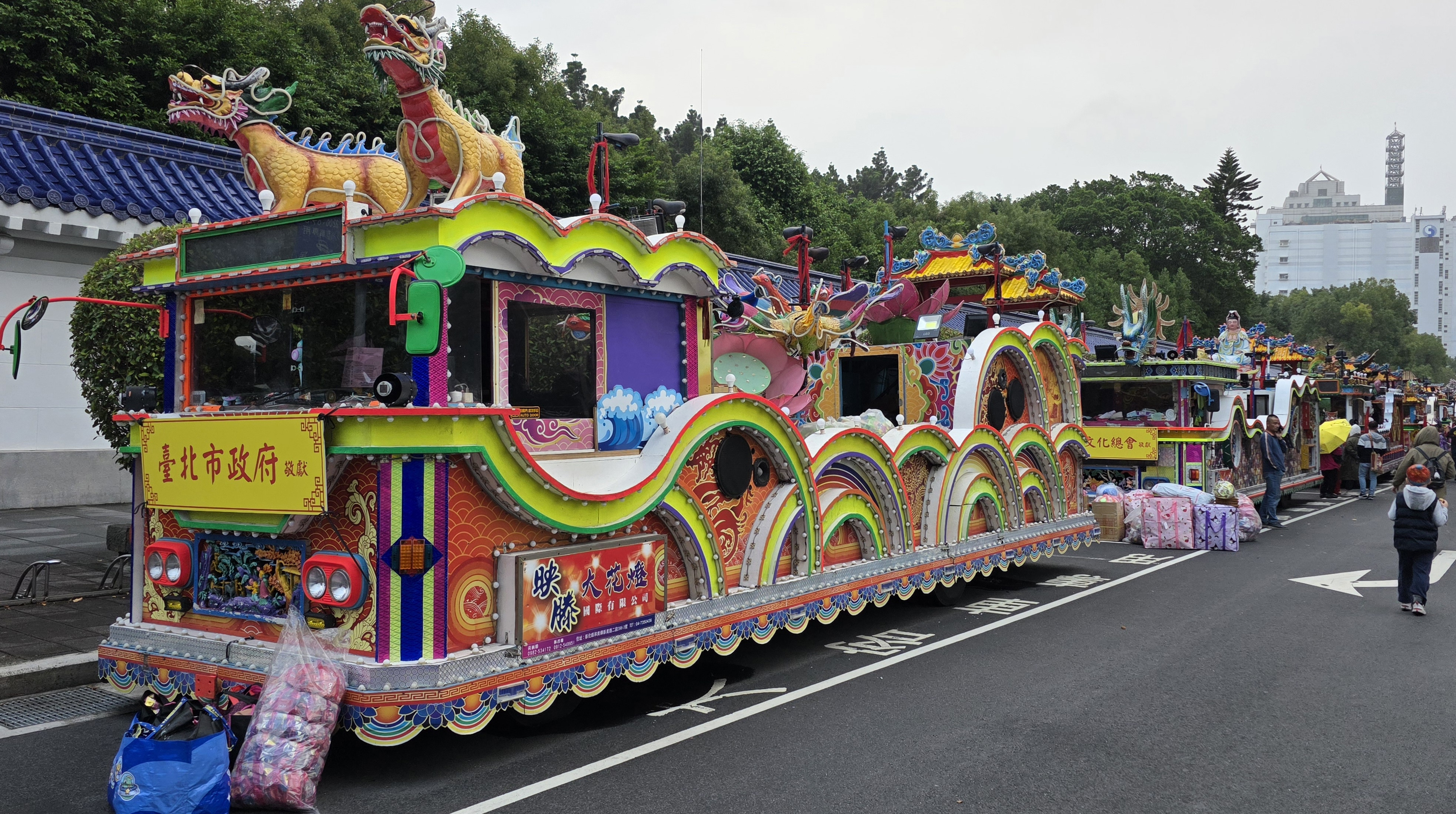
- Parade floats during the Qingshan King Rituals in Wanhua District, Taipei
- Dates: 20–22 (sometimes 20–23) of the 10th month of the lunar calendar
- Frequency: Annual
- Locations: Wanhua District, Taipei, Taiwan

The Qing Shan King Sacrificial Ceremony (Chinese: 艋舺青山王祭; Tongyong Pinyin: Mǒngjǐa Cīngshān Wáng Jì; Tâi-lô: Báng-kah Tshing-san-ông Tsè), also known as the Qingshan King Rituals or the Grand Worship of Bangka (艋舺大拜拜), is a traditional religious festival held annually in Wanhua District of Taipei, Taiwan. The event celebrates the birthday of the deity Ling'an Zunwang (zh:青山靈安尊王), commonly known as the Qing Shan King (青山王).

The festival takes place each year from the 20th to the 22nd day of the tenth month in the Taiwanese lunisolar calendar. It includes temple ceremonies, pilgrimages, and large-scale processions through the streets of Wanhua. During the festival, deities and bodhisattvas from neighboring temples—including Bangka Qingshui Temple, Bangka Longshan Temple, and Taipei Mazu Temple—are invited as guest deities to participate in the celebrations. The event is regarded as one of the three major temple fairs in Taipei, alongside the birthday celebrations of the Taipei Xia-Hai City God Temple in Dadaocheng and the procession of the Poh Seng Tai Tay.

== History ==
The festival is closely connected to the history of Bangka (艋舺), an early settlement that later developed into modern Taipei. Bangka Qingshan Temple (艋舺青山宮) was established in 1856 after migrants from Hui'an County in Fujian brought the deity Ling'an Zunwang to the area in 1854. According to local legend, when the deity's palanquin was carried through Bangka, it suddenly became too heavy to move near the present site of the temple. This was interpreted as a sign that the deity wished to reside there, and a temple was subsequently built.

The arrival of the deity coincided with a period when Bangka was suffering from outbreaks of disease. After residents prayed to Ling'an Zunwang, many believed the epidemic subsided, strengthening the local community’s devotion to the deity. Over time, annual rituals were organized to express gratitude and commemorate the deity’s birthday.

During the Japanese colonial period, temple festivals continued to be held and sometimes expanded in scale. One of the largest celebrations occurred in 1935 when the Qingshan Temple procession was combined with religious events connected to the Taiwan Exposition, drawing thousands of participants.

Following the introduction of assimilation policies later in the colonial era, public temple festivals were temporarily restricted. After World War II, the festival resumed and grew again in popularity. In 1953, the Taipei City Government designated the Qingshan King Rituals as an official autumn worship event in the former Longshan District. In 1975, the rituals were listed as one of the seven major religious ceremonies in Taipei.

In 2025, the Qing Shan King Sacrificial Ceremony marked its 170th anniversary and is widely recognized as an important element of Wanhua's cultural heritage.

== Festival activities ==
The Qing Shan King Sacrificial Ceremony consists of a series of religious events, processions, and performances that take place over several days. Temple rituals are conducted to honor the birthday of Qing Shan King, while guest deities from other temples are invited to attend the celebrations. Local residents set up offering tables along the streets, and temporary stages are sometimes erected for performances and religious ceremonies.

One notable tradition during the festival is the distribution of "Salty Kompyang" (鹹光餅), a type of traditional Taiwanese biscuit. Millions of these biscuits are handed out to worshippers and visitors during the celebration.

== Processions ==
A major feature of the festival is the series of processions through the streets of Wanhua. These processions typically take place over two nights prior to the main celebration and may continue late into the night, sometimes ending around 3 or 4 a.m.

During the processions, statues of Qingshan King and accompanying deities are carried in palanquins through designated routes within Wanhua. The purpose of the procession is traditionally understood as a form of spiritual inspection and purification, intended to cleanse the neighborhood and drive away malevolent spirits or harmful influences.

Residents traditionally close their windows and doors while the procession passes to prevent wandering spirits from entering their homes. Firecrackers are frequently set off along the route, symbolizing protection and good fortune. Several routes are followed during the procession, including areas near Huanhe Road, Zhonghua Road, Wanhua Station, and Ximending.

== Parade formations ==
Among the most recognizable participants in the procession are the "Eight Generals" (八將團) of Qingshan Temple. These performers wear elaborate costumes and face paint representing protective spirit generals. The formation is unique in that it consists of four red-faced generals and four green-faced generals.

The performers carry traditional implements and perform ritualized movements known as "ghost steps", which are believed to help protect the deity during the procession and ward off evil spirits. Another ceremonial figure known as the "guiding child" accompanies the generals. The figure carries a lantern and symbolically guides the procession.

== Contemporary issues ==
While the festival remains an important cultural event in Wanhua, it has also generated discussion about the balance between tradition and modern urban life. Large crowds, firecrackers, and late-night processions have occasionally led to complaints from residents about noise. In response, temple organizers and the Taipei City Government have implemented measures to reduce environmental impact, such as limiting firecracker use and arranging cleanup operations after processions. These efforts aim to preserve the traditional rituals while adapting them to contemporary urban conditions.

== Gallery ==
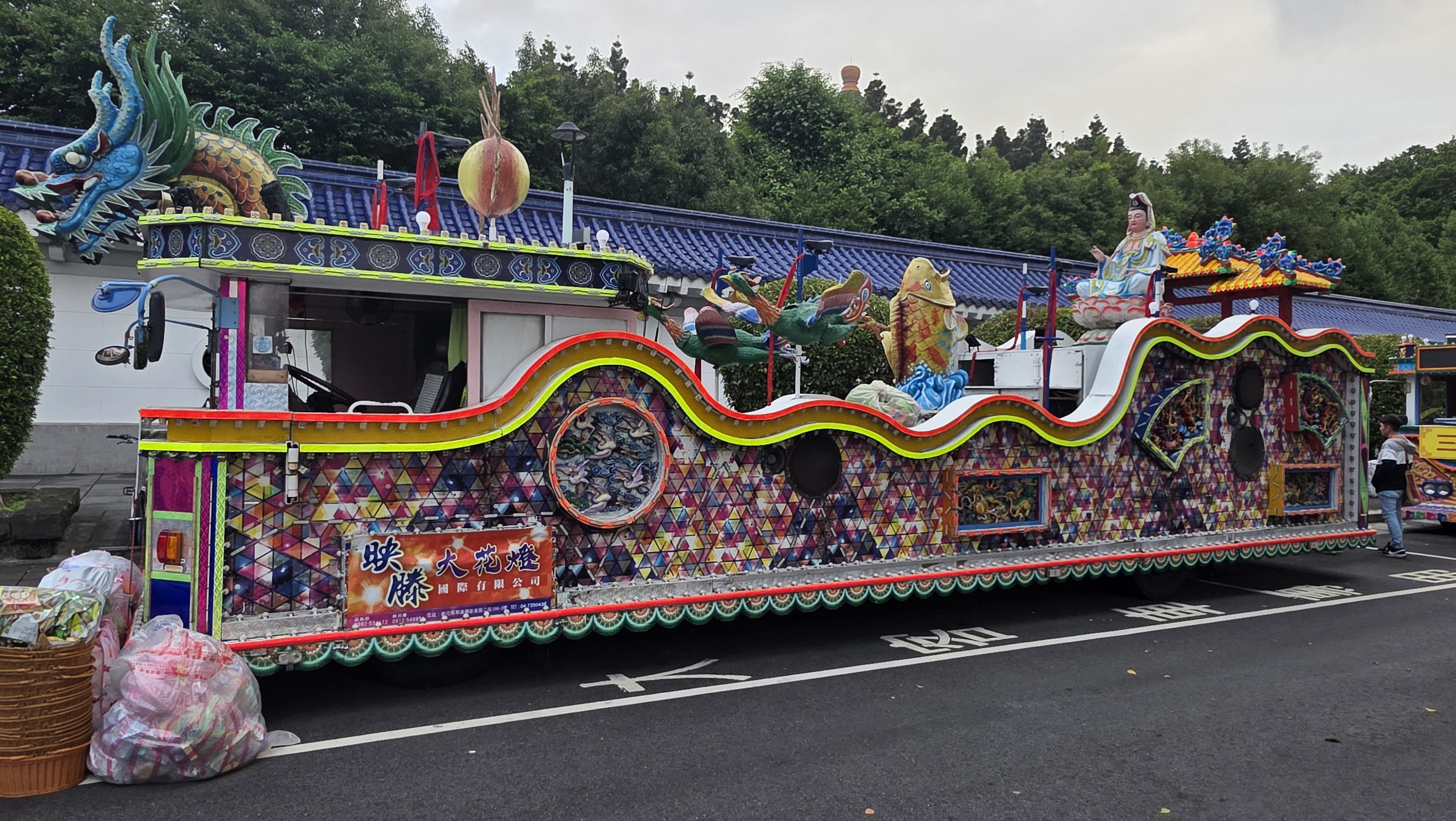

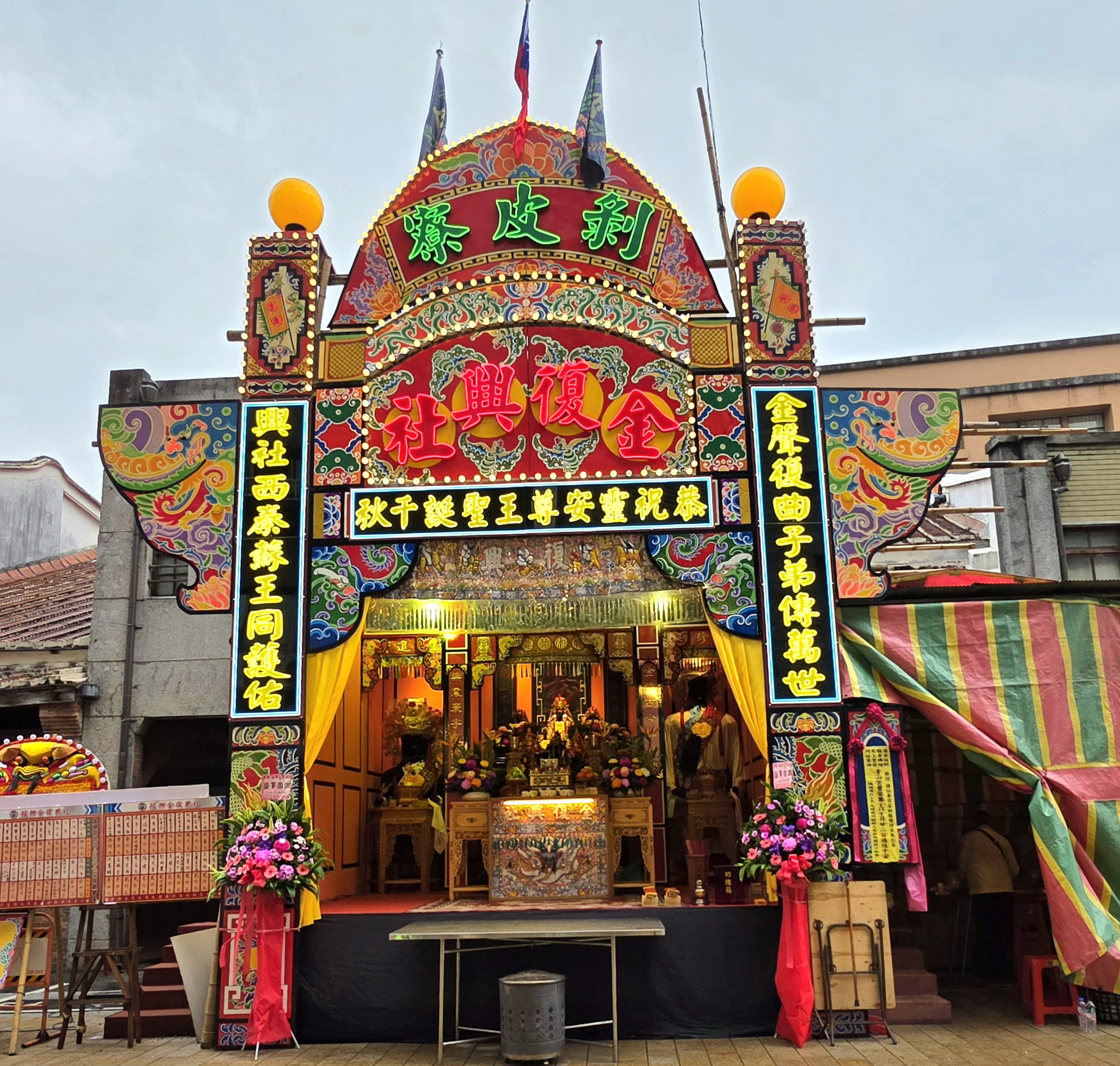

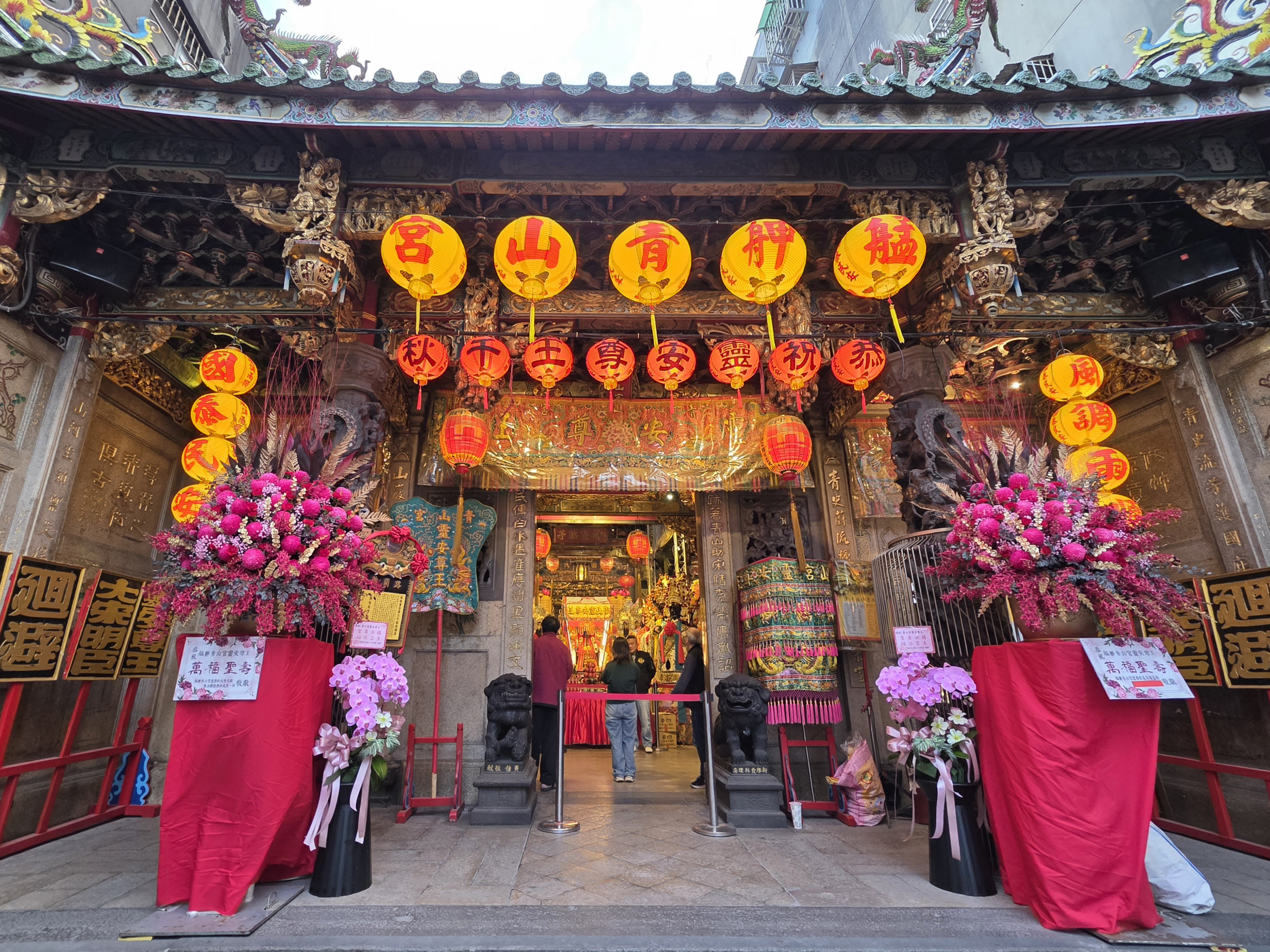

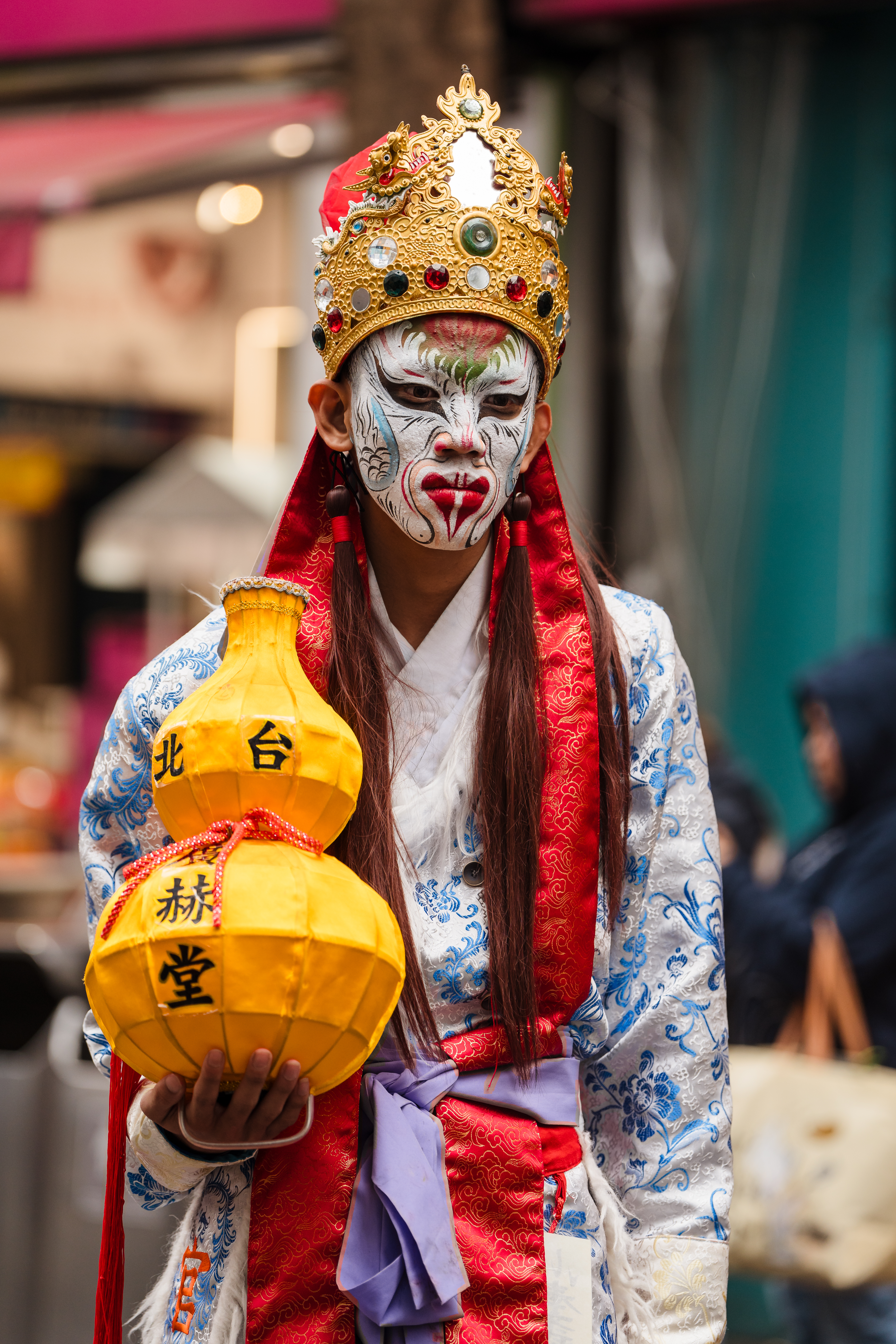

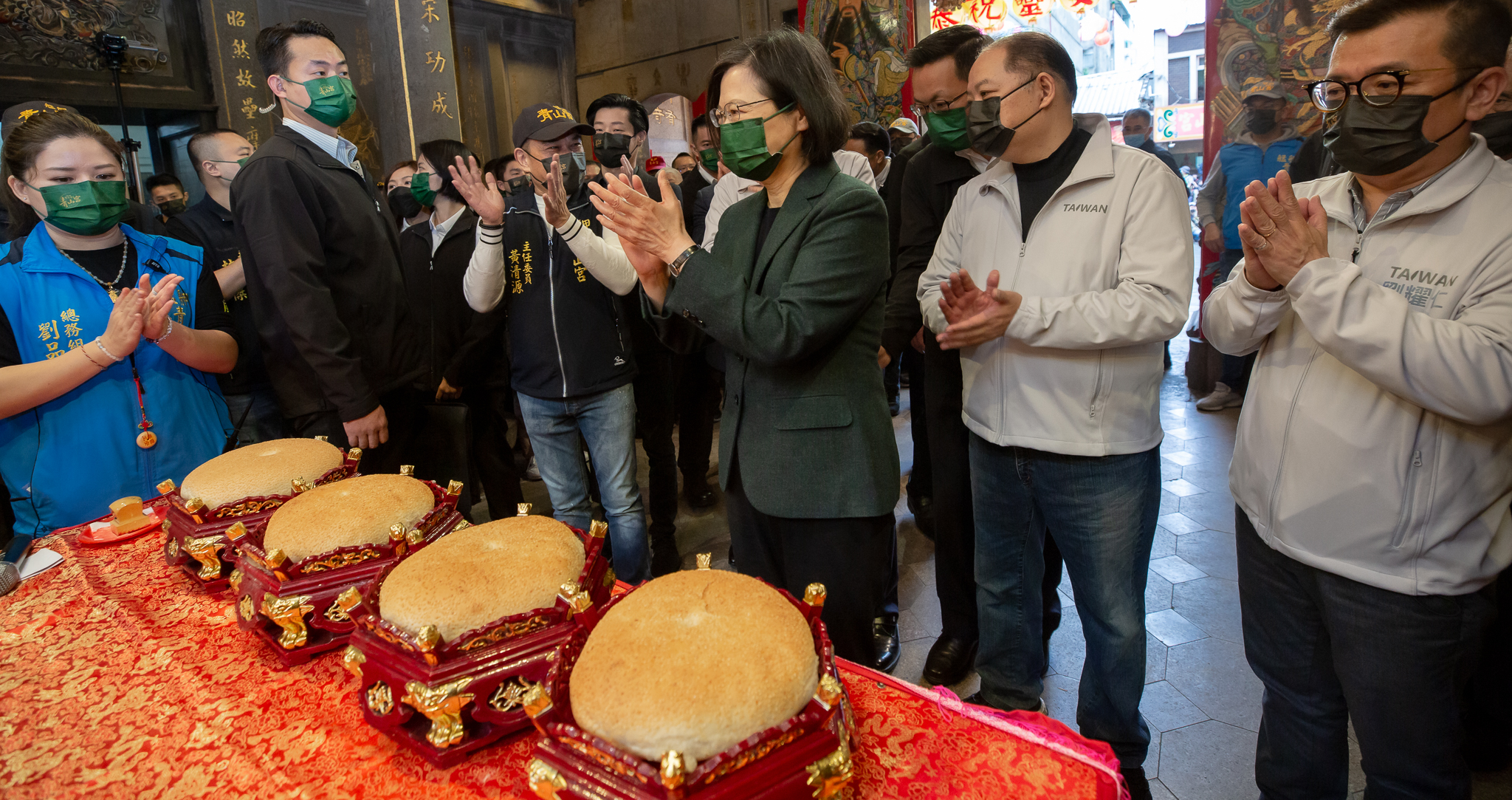

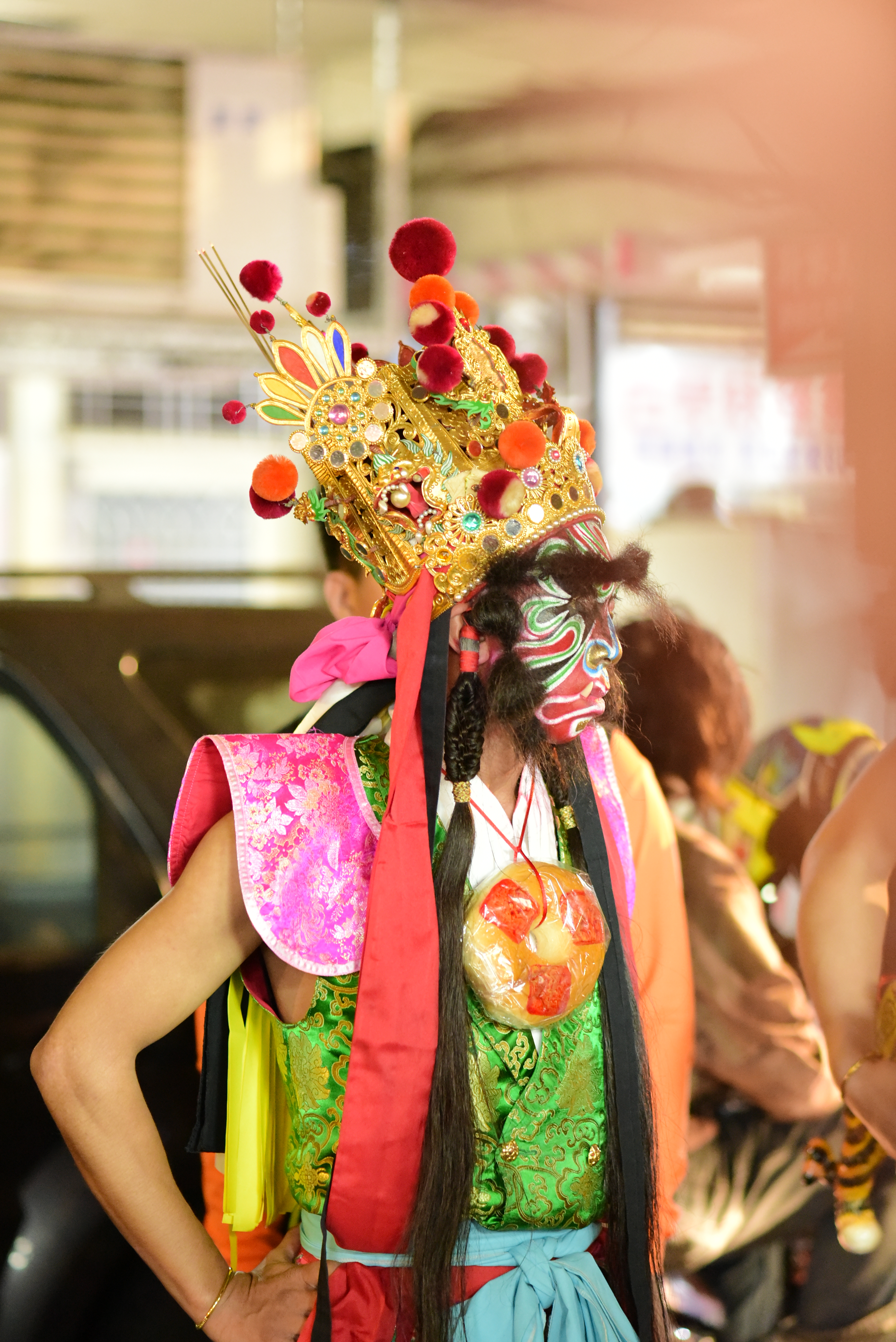

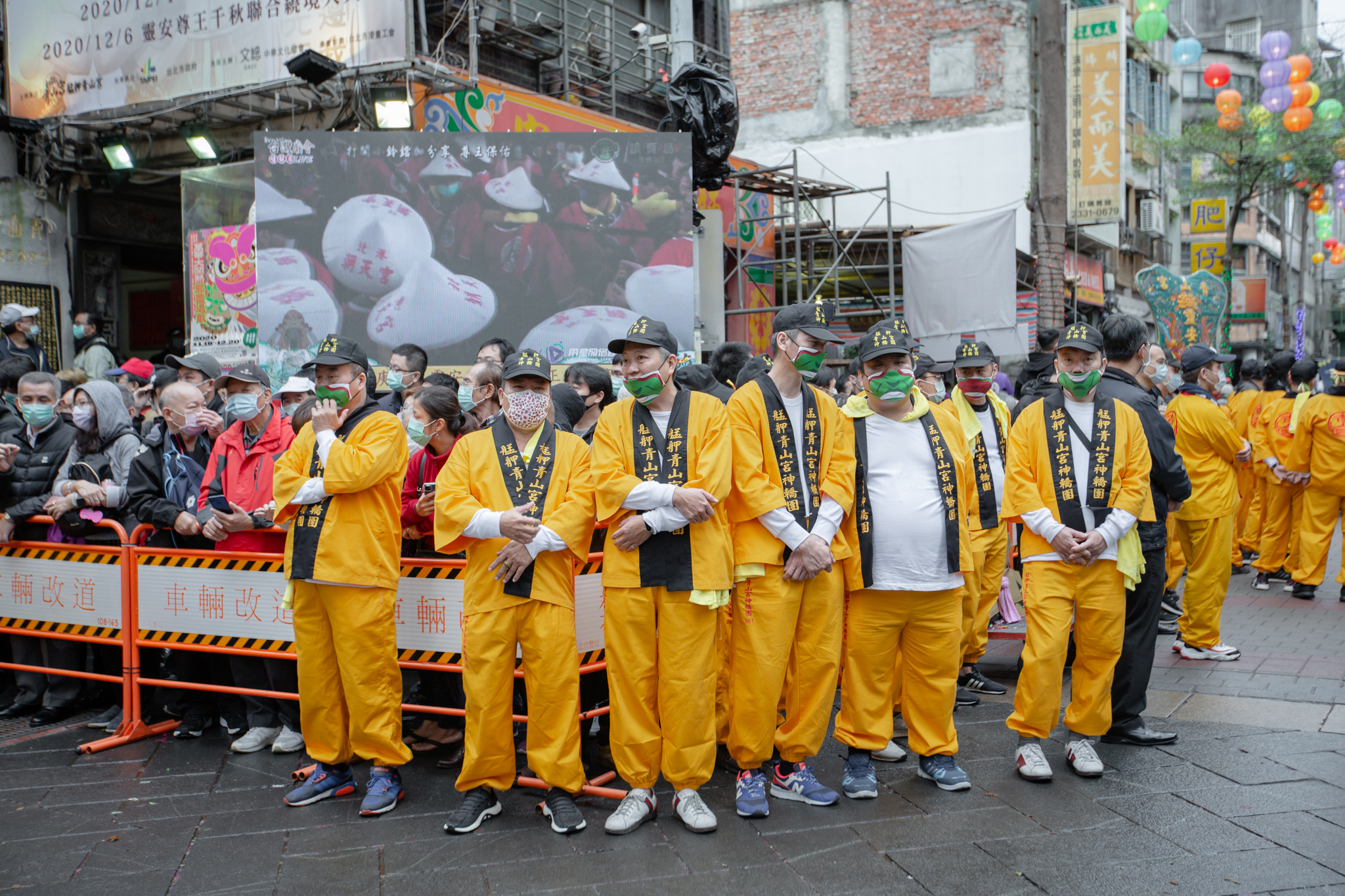

== See also ==
- List of festivals in Taiwan
- Wanhua District
