= Heritage and Culture Education Center of Taipei City =

Historical building in Wanhua, Taipei, Taiwan

- 臺北市鄉土教育中心
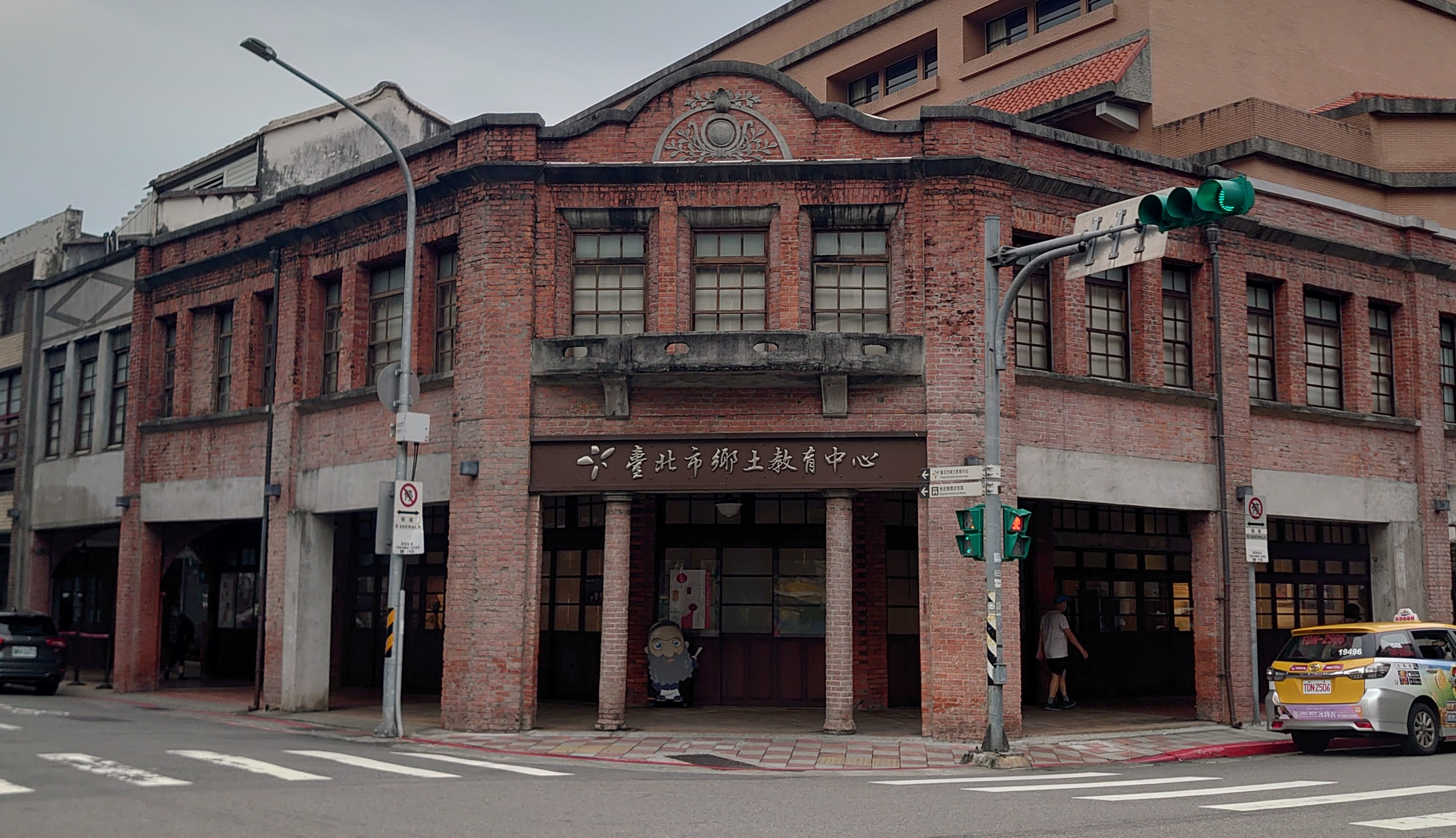
- Interactive map of the Heritage and Culture Education Center of Taipei City area

General information
- Location: Wanhua, Taipei, Taiwan
- Coordinates: 25°2′12.2″N 121°30′11.8″E

Other information
- Public transit: Metro; Longshan Temple station: :BL10

Website
- hcec.tp.edu.tw

The Heritage and Culture Education Center of Taipei City (traditional Chinese: 台北鄉土教育中心; simplified Chinese: 台北乡土教育中心; pinyin: Táiběi Xiāngtǔ Jiàoyù Zhōngxīn) is located in the Bopiliao Historic Block in Wanhua District, Taipei, Taiwan.

== Architecture ==
Most of the buildings in the area are historic buildings which feature architectural style from the Qing Dynasty period, with arched bricks arcades and curved pattern window lattices.

== Transportation ==
The center is accessible within walking distance north east of Longshan Temple Station of Taipei Metro.

== See also ==
- List of tourist attractions in Taiwan
