= Bangka Park =

Park in Wanhua, Taipei, Taiwan

- Mangka Park; Mengjia Park; Mengxia Park
- 艋舺公園
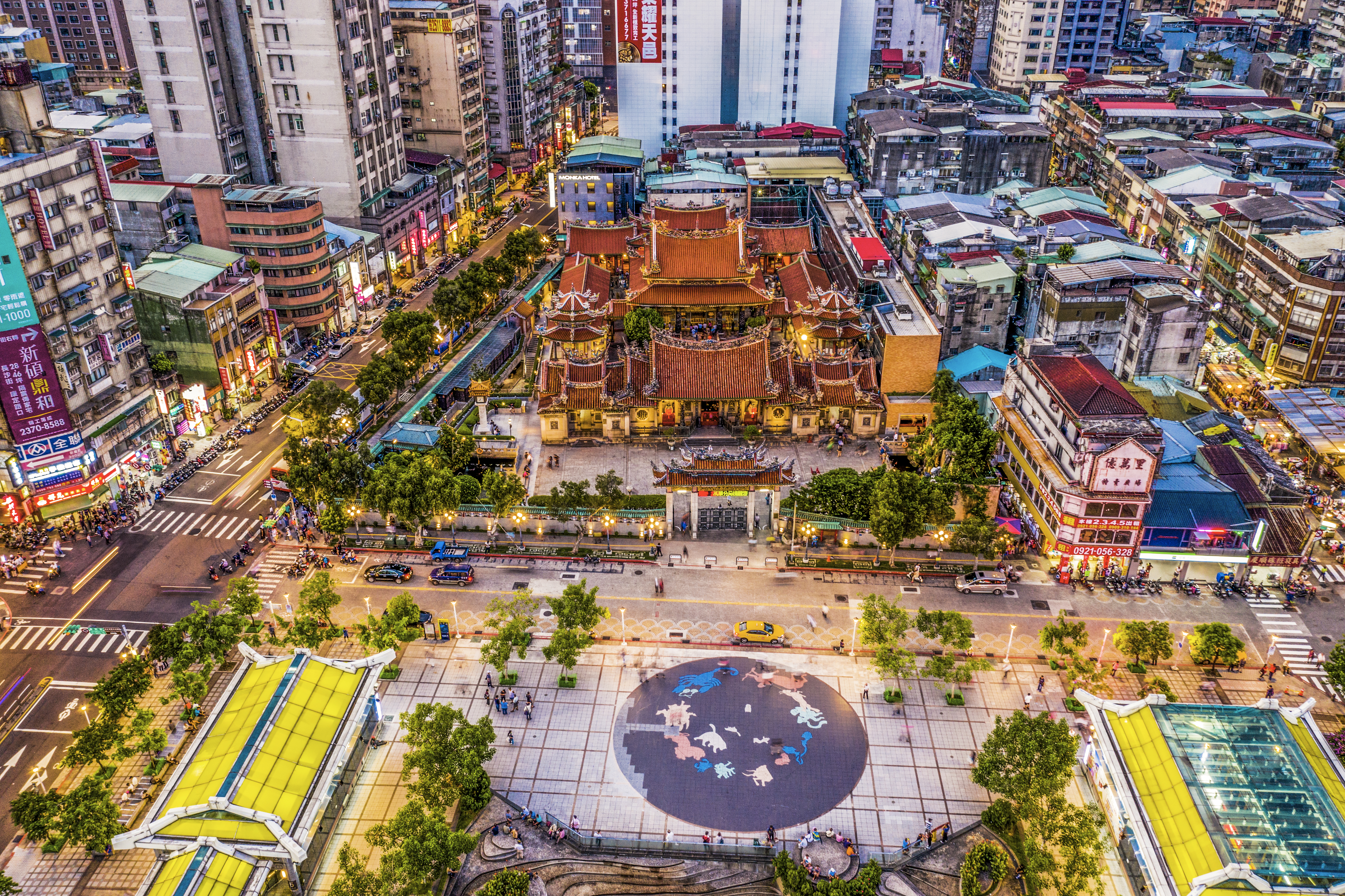
- Bangka Park and the adjacent Lungshan Temple
- Interactive map of Bangka Park
- Type: park
- Location: Wanhua, Taipei, Taiwan
- Coordinates: 25°2′9.6″N 121°29′59.7″E
- Opening: 22 January 2005
- Public transit: Longshan Temple Station

The Bangka Park (also Mangka Park, Mengjia Park and Mengxia Park) (traditional Chinese: 艋舺公園; simplified Chinese: 艋舺公园; pinyin: Měngjiǎ Gōngyuán) is a park in Wanhua District, Taipei, Taiwan.

== Name ==
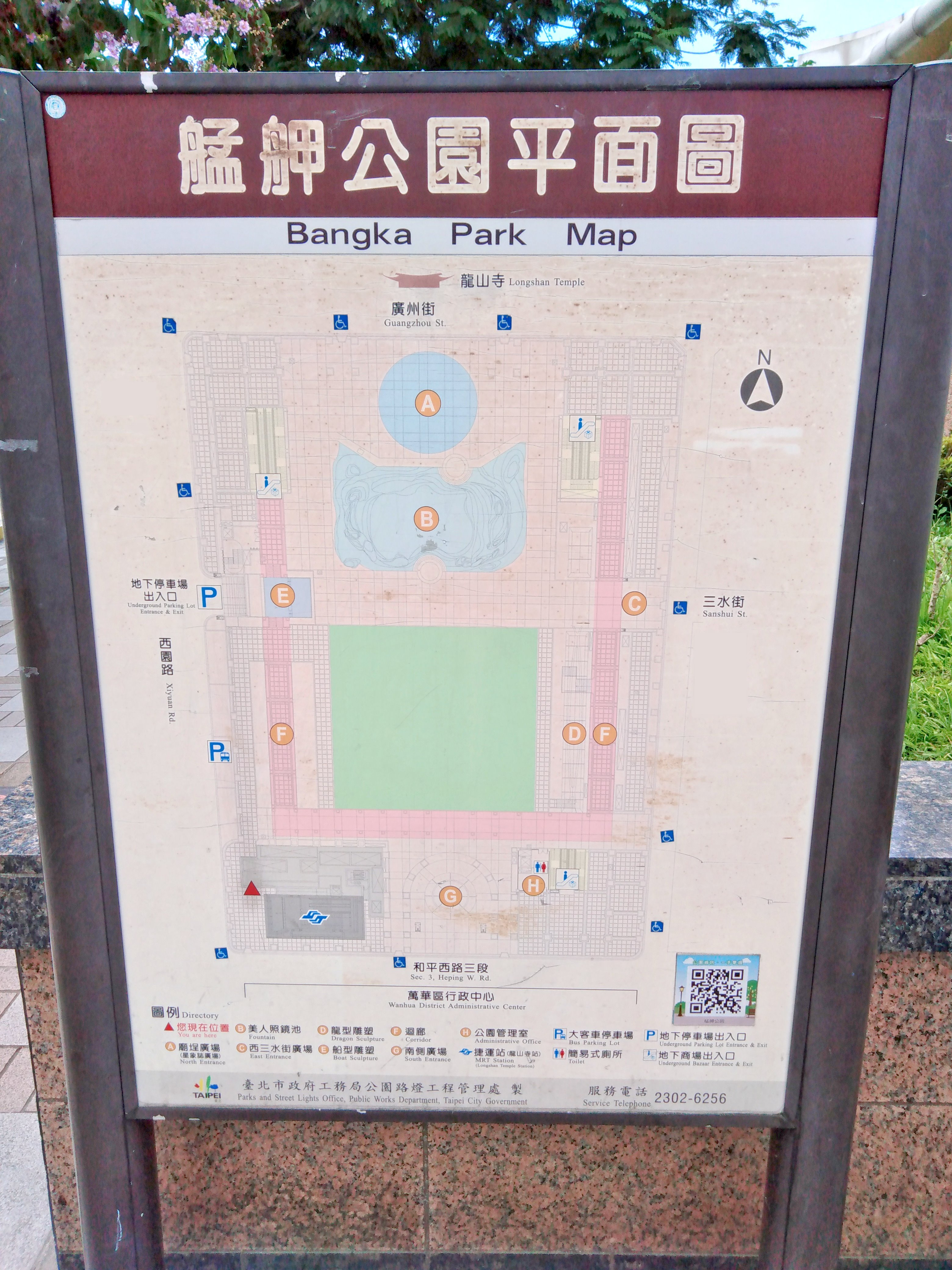
Map of Bangka Park

Mangka Park (from Taiwanese Hokkien) or Mengjia Park (from Mandarin) is a transliteration of the word moungar, a Taiwanese aboriginal word for canoe or gathering place for canoe. It used to be known as Park No. 12.

== History ==
In 1738, the Lungshan Temple of Manka was constructed. In 1923, the land area in front of the temple was forested and named Mengxia Park. In 1956, Taipei Mayor Kao Yu-shu (Chinese: 高玉樹) gave permission for street vendors to set up their stalls at the park. Since then, the park became the gathering place for the vendors and homeless people, which resulted a bad and dirty environment around the park. In 1992, Mayor Huang Ta-chou allocated a budget to rejuvenate the area. In 1995, the Department of Rapid Transit Systems held a public competition to carry out the planning and design to rejuvenate the park, which was won by ROW and Associates Architects. Later in an effort to preserve the area, Taipei City Government planned to make urban renewal plan on the temple area, three major squares and lotus pond, and to create culture and art gallery, underground shopping center and underground parking lot. The project was won by Weichuan Construction Company, Kailay Engineering Company, Fure-Lin Engineering Company and China-Ryoden Company. The permit for underground construction was issued in July 1998 and the groundbreaking ceremony was officiated by Mayor Ma Ying-jeou on 24 February 1999. The park was officially opened in a ceremony officiated by Mayor Ma on 22 January 2005.

== Architecture ==
The park features a dragon-shaped fountain.

== Transportation ==
The park is accessible from Longshan Temple Station of Taipei Metro.

== See also ==
- Geography of Taiwan
- Longshan Temple Underground Shopping Mall
