= Sugar Refinery Cultural Park =

Cultural center in Wanhua, Taipei, Taiwan

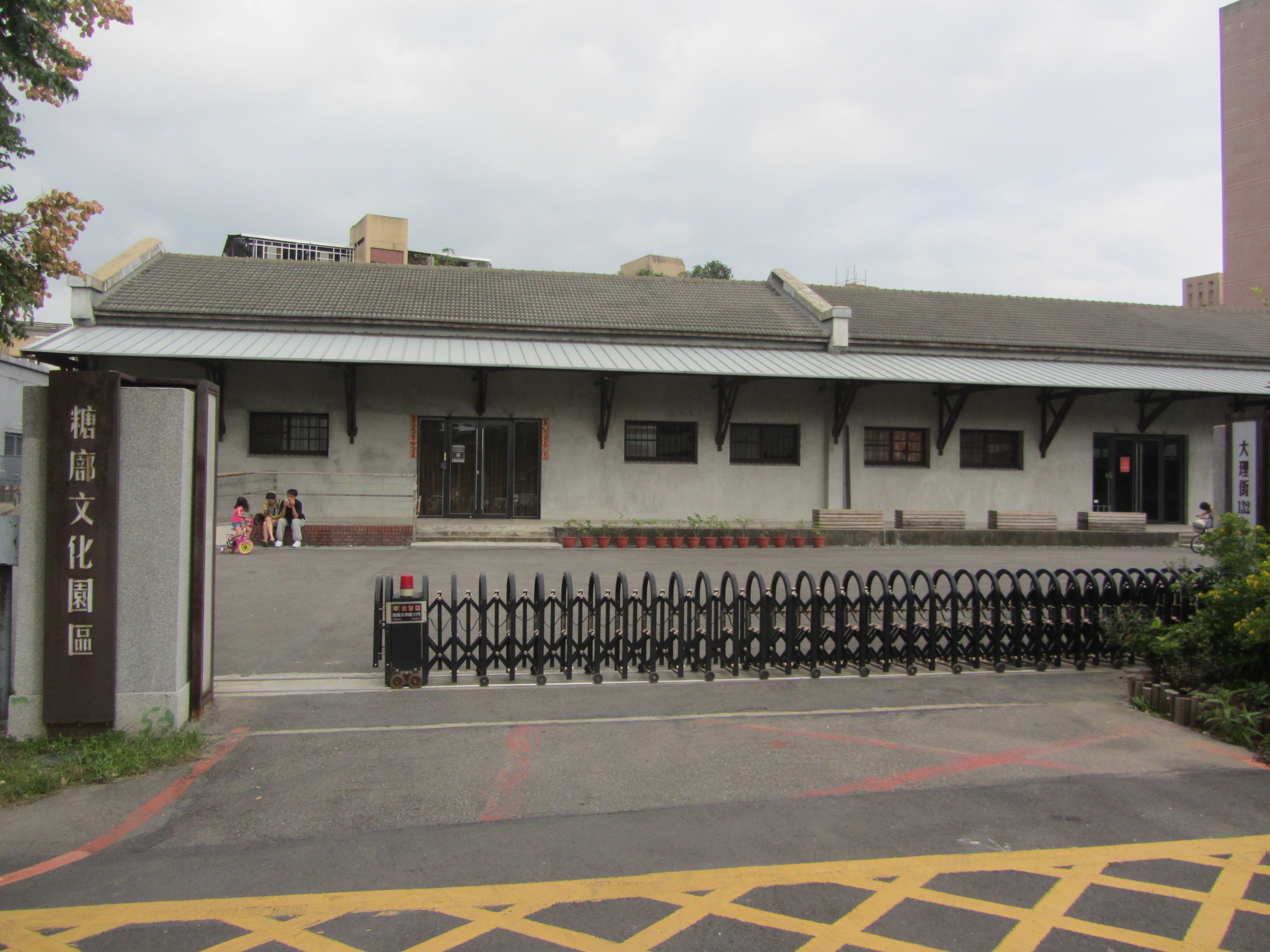

- Taiwan
- Former names: Taipei Sugar Refinery; Tangbu Cultural Park
- Location: Wanhua, Taipei, Taiwan
- Coordinates: 25°01′59.7″N 121°29′43.2″E
- Type: cultural center
- Surface: 1 hectare

The Sugar Refinery Cultural Park is a cultural center in Wanhua District, Taipei, Taiwan, transformed from a former sugar refinery.

== History ==
The cultural center was originally constructed as Taipei Sugar Refinery during the Japanese rule of Taiwan and run from 1911 to 1942. After the handover of Taiwan from Japan to the Republic of China in 1945, the factory was taken over by Taiwan Sugar Corporation. The building was declared the 106th historical site of Taipei on 23 September 2003. On 20 November 2010, the area was transformed into Tangbu Cultural Park (traditional Chinese: 糖廍文化園區; simplified Chinese: 糖廍文化园区; pinyin: Tángbù Wénhuà Yuánqū). In 2024, it was renamed to Sugar Refinery Cultural Park.

== Architecture ==
The cultural center spans over an area of one hectare. It consists of three warehouses, which house permanent exhibition, Tangbu Cultural Warehouse and troupe residence.

== Transportation ==
The cultural center is accessible within walking distance southwest of Longshan Temple Station of Taipei Metro.

== See also ==
- List of tourist attractions in Taiwan
