= Wang's Broth =

Restaurant in Taipei, Taiwan

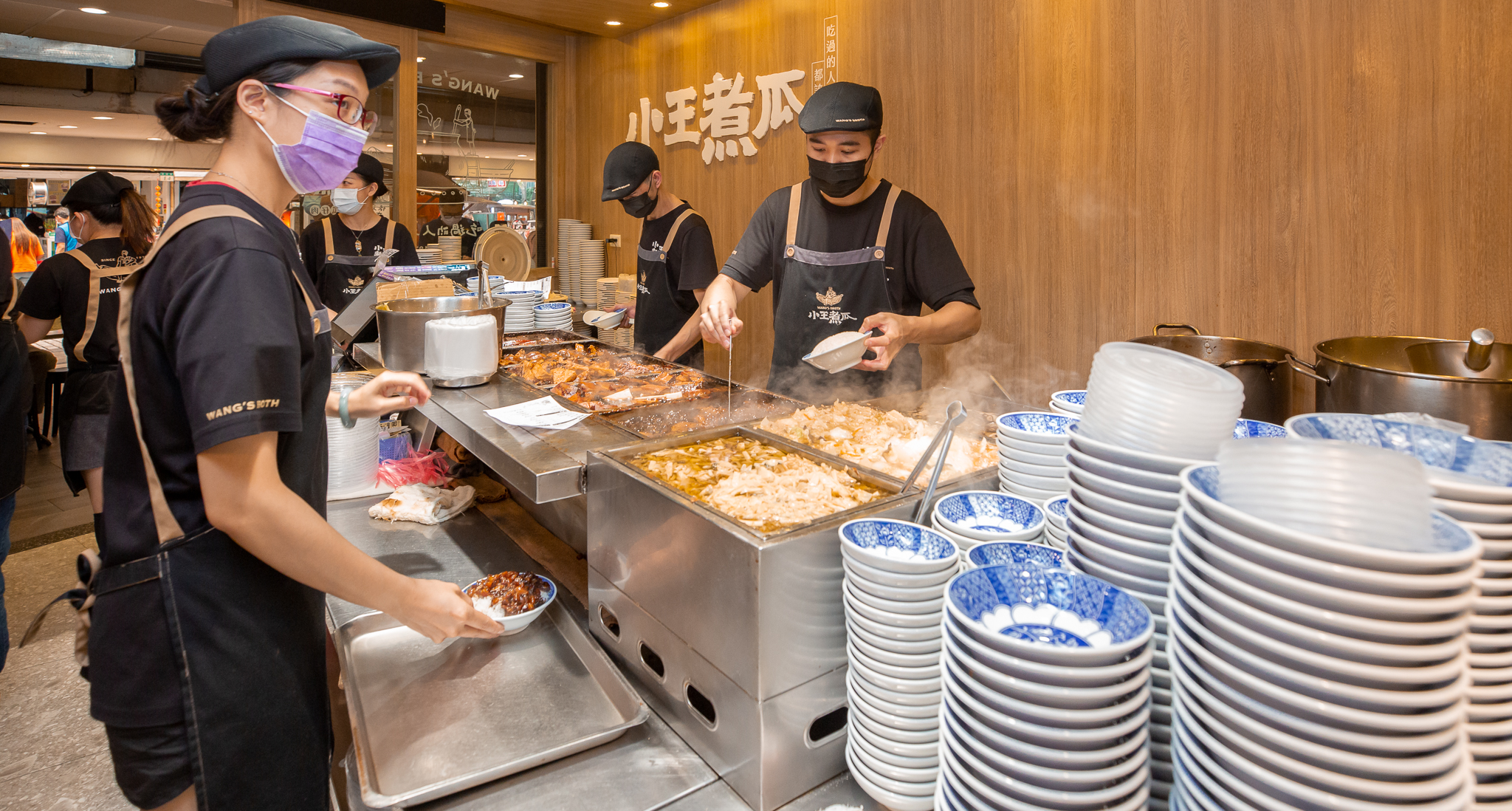
- Interior of the shop, 2023

Restaurant information
- Location: Taipei, Taiwan

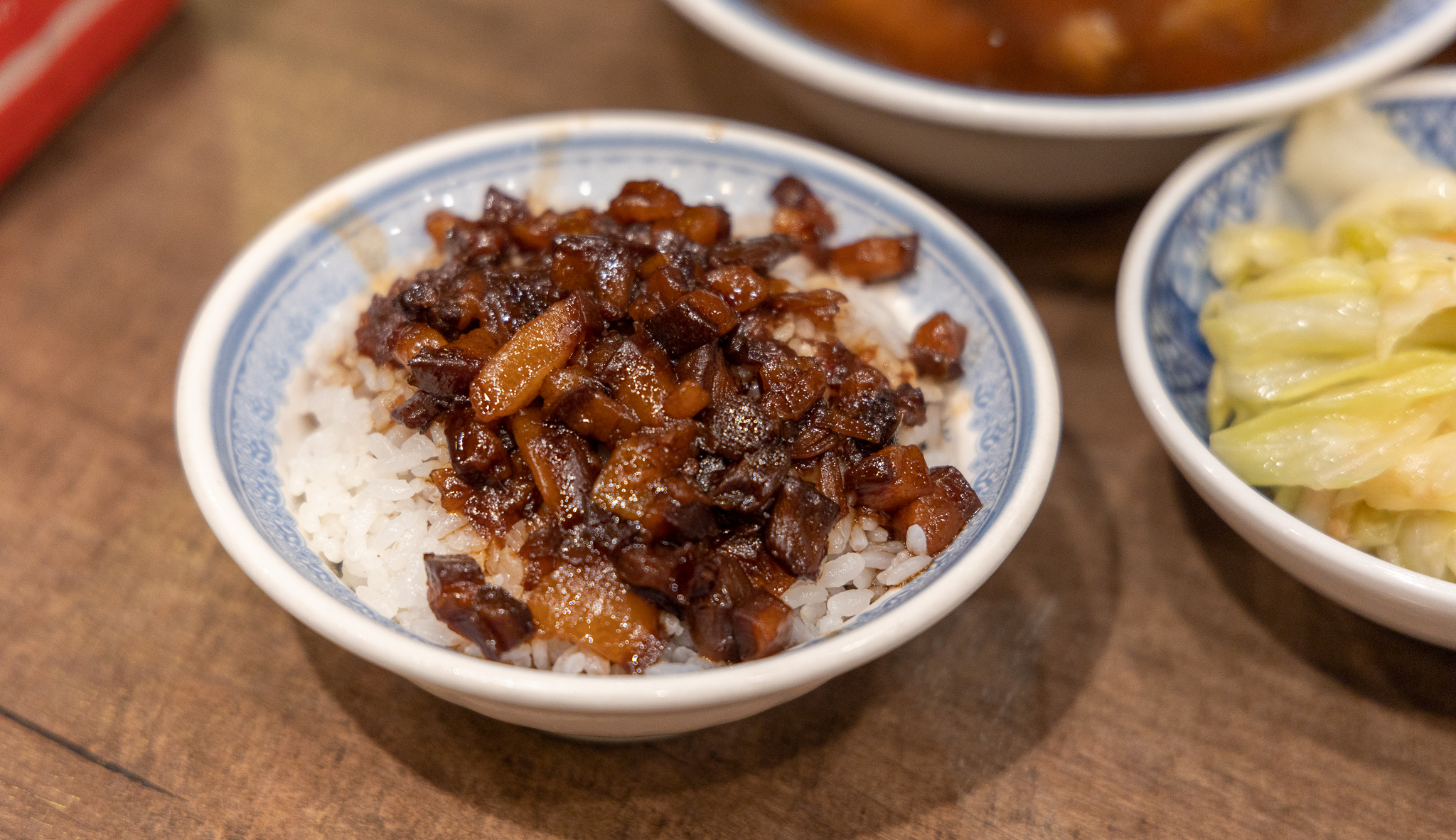
Ló͘-bah-pn̄g at Wang's Broth at Huaxi Street in Wanhua, Taipei, 2023

Wang's Broth is a restaurant at Snake Alley (or Huaxi Street Night Market) in Taipei, Taiwan. It has received Bib Gourmand status in the Michelin Guide. The menu includes Ló͘-bah-pn̄g (braised pork rice, or minced pork and pickled cucumber in broth), as well as rice and "black gold" pork sauce.

Wang's Broth is among the night market's most popular vendors.
