= Qingyunge Art =

Building in Wanhua, Taipei, Taiwan

- 青雲閣
- Interactive map of the Qingyunge Art area

General information
- Type: cultural center
- Location: Wanhua, Taipei, Taiwan
- Coordinates: 25°02′20.3″N 121°29′52.7″E
- Inaugurated: 20 October 2022
- Demolished: 2014

Technical details
- Floor count: 3

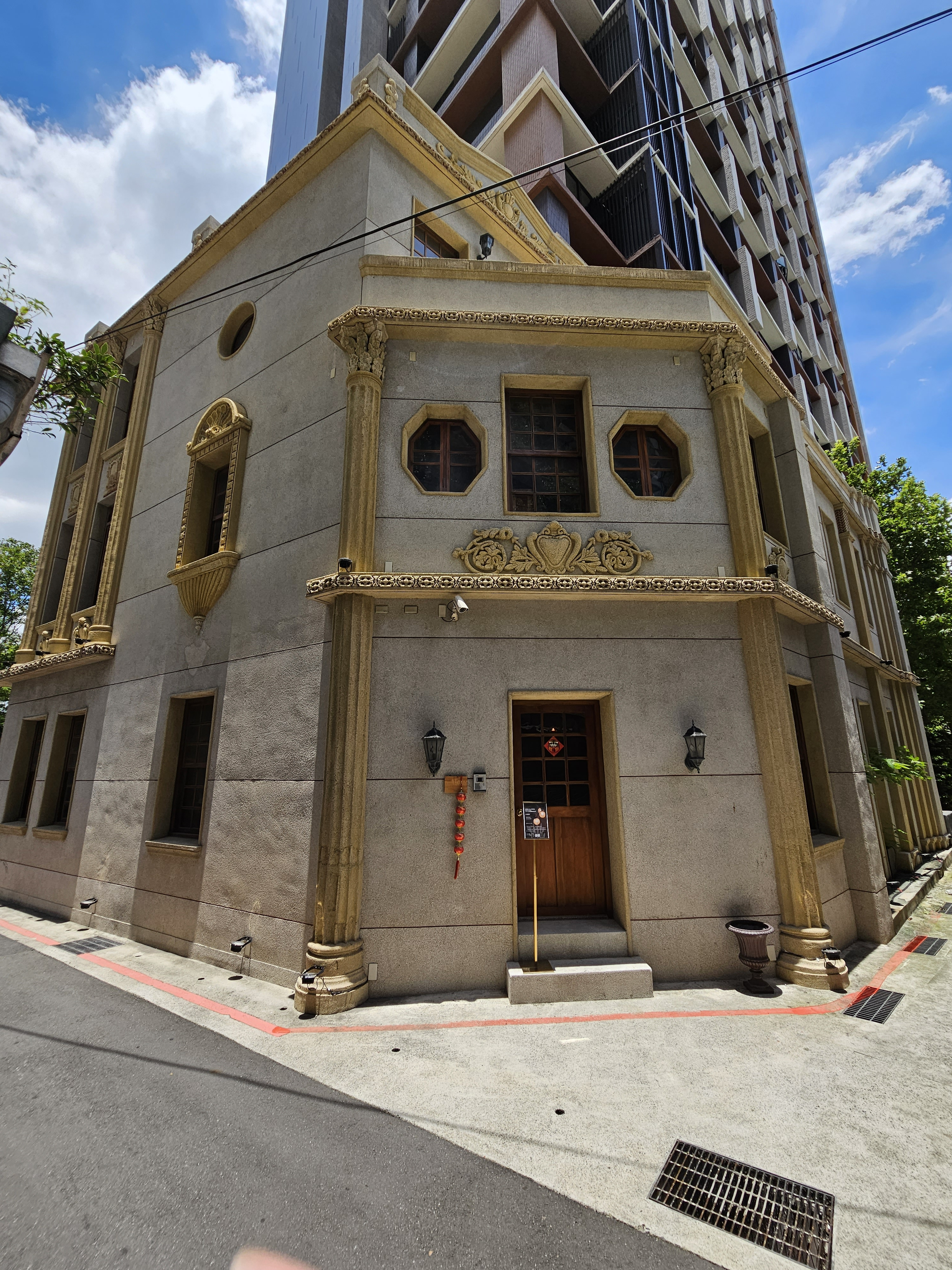
Qingyun Pavilion. It was once damaged by developers and later rebuilt.

The Qingyunge Art (QYG Art; traditional Chinese: 青雲閣; simplified Chinese: 青云阁; pinyin: Qīngyún Gé) is a cultural center in Wanhua District, Taipei, Taiwan.

== Name ==
The name Qingyue has a literal meaning of blue clouds chamber.

== History ==
Before 2014, the building was severely damaged. Starting 2014, the building was restored at a cost of NT$30 million and transformed it into a cultural center. It was then reopened in an opening ceremony on 20 October 2022.

== Architecture ==
The building is a three-story structure. It features a logo designed by calligrapher Tong Yang-tze (董陽孜).
