= Hong I-nan =

Taiwanese scholar and poet (1871–1927)

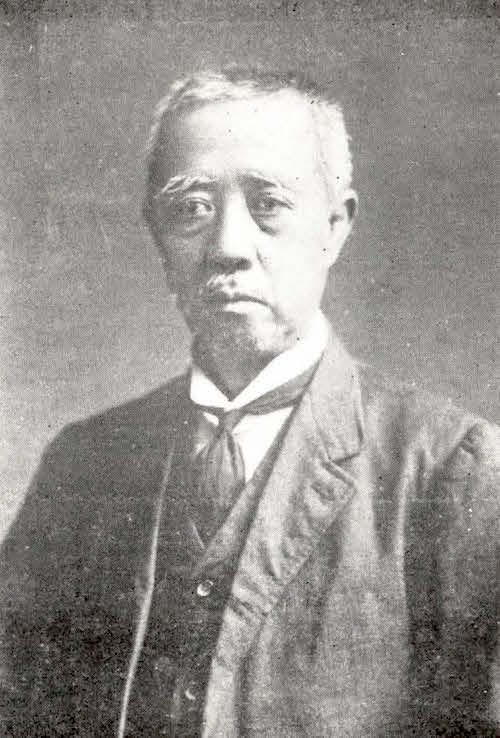
Hong I-nan

Hong I-nan (1871–1927) was a Taiwanese scholar and poet during the Japanese colonial period. He was from Monga (now known as Wanhua) in Taipei, and had the given name Wencheng, the courtesy name Yiya, and the pseudonyms Moqiao, Wuliangchizhe, and Daguanlouzhu. He was famous for his traditional Chinese poetry. He compiled a collection of his works entitled "Miaoxiangge Collection."

Hong I-nan (1871–1927) was born on April 7, 1871 in Monga (present-day Wanhua), Taipei. His ancestral home was in Quan'an, Quanzhou, Fujian, and his grandfather, Hong Tengyun, had moved to Taipei and became a successful rice merchant. Recognizing Hong I-nan's exceptional intelligence, his family hired Gong Xianhe, a renowned scholar from Quanzhou, to teach him at a young age. By his youth, he had already read many classical Chinese works. In 1895, Hong I-nan passed the imperial examination in Fujian Province and obtained the title of xiucai in Quan'an County. The following year, he returned to Taiwan to take over the family business. In 1897, he was appointed as a consultant to the Taipei Office by the Japanese colonial authorities, a position he held until March 1901. Later, he held various positions, such as the deputy head of the Mangaokeng local defense office, a trustee of the Temporary Taiwan Customs Investigation Committee, an advisor to the Taipei Government, the chief of Tamsui District, and the head of Tamsui Street. In 1913, he moved to Tamsui and purchased the Tamsui Red Castle, where he collected cultural relics from various places and called himself the "master of Daguan Building."

Hong I-nan was skilled in poetry, calligraphy, and painting. He specialized in the Yan Zhenqing style of calligraphy and was known for his bamboo paintings. In 1909, he co-founded the Ying Society Poetry Club with Xie Ruzhen (1871–1953), Lin Xinlan (1870–1923), and others. He served as the first president and gathered 150 poets from northern Taiwan. Hong I-nan remained active in the political, business, and literary circles of the Japanese colonial era and often participated in calligraphy and painting exhibitions, poetry gatherings, and other cultural events. He died on May 14, 1927, at the age of 57 due to illness.

== Descendents ==
His son, Hong Chang-gerng (1893–1966), was the first ophthalmologist with a doctorate degree in Taiwan. His great-grandson, Hong Chih-wen, is a scholar of Taiwanese railway culture and meteorology. In 2010, he compiled Hong I-nan's 320 Chinese poems and published the book Hong I-nan's Modern Civilization Travel Footprints in Taiwan.
