= Snake Alley (Taipei) =

Market in Wanhua, Taipei, Taiwan

Snake Alley 華西街夜市
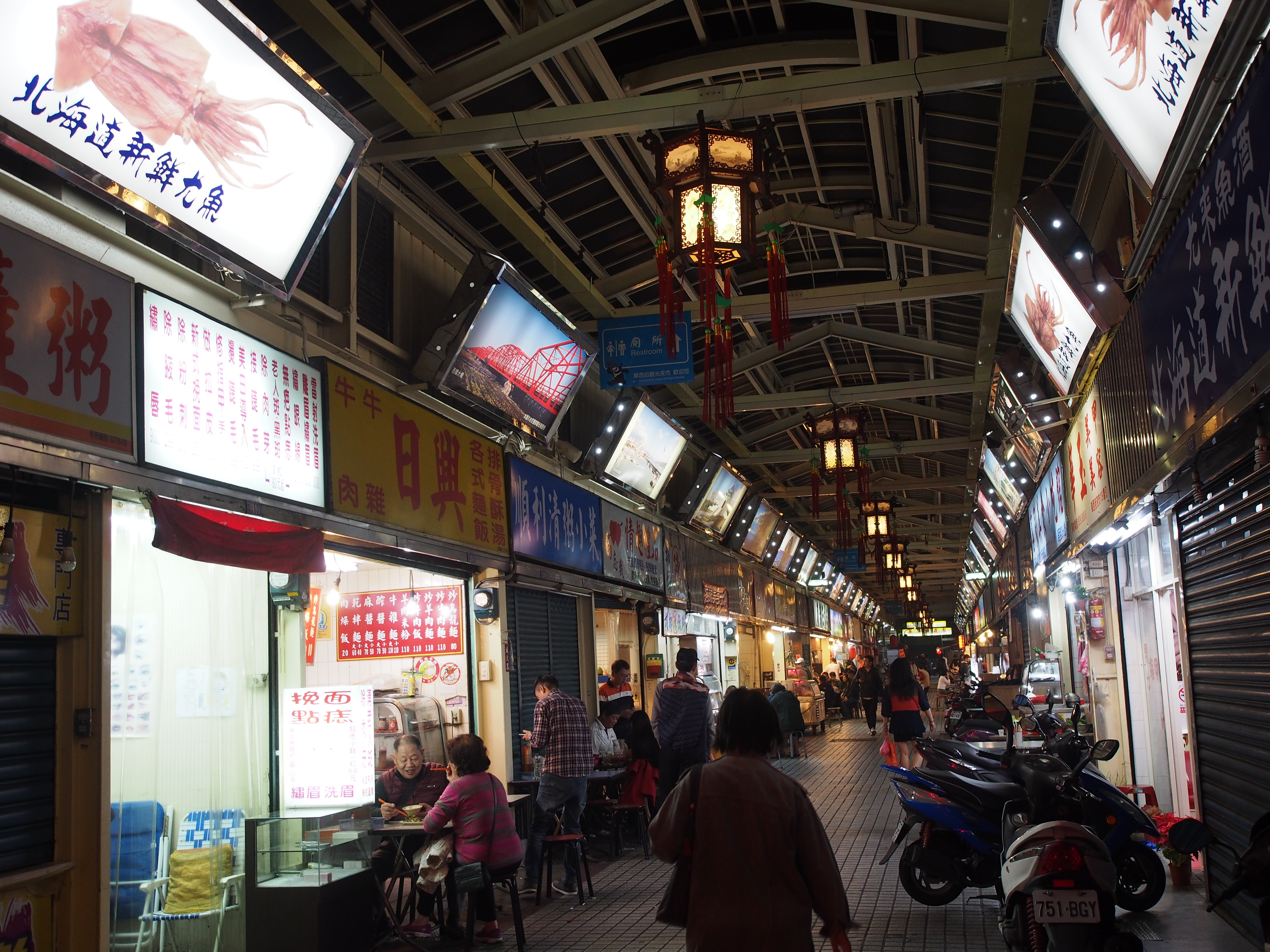
- Location: Wanhua, Taipei, Taiwan; 25.0386°N 121.4985°E
- Environment: Night market
- Interactive map of Snake Alley

Snake Alley (Chinese: 華西街夜市; pinyin: Huáxījiē Yèshì), also known as Huaxi Street Night Market or Huaxi Street Tourist Night Market (Chinese: 華西街觀光夜市) is a market in Wanhua District, Taipei, Taiwan. The market is located near the Bangka Lungshan Temple as well as other night markets located on Guangzhou Street, Wuzhou Street and Xichang Street.

The Huaxi Night Market is a two-block long night market in Wanhua District, the oldest district of Taipei, Taiwan. It contains stands serving local snacks, and restaurants that serve traditional Taiwanese dishes and many delicacies including snake blood and meat, turtle blood and meat and deer penis wine, which are not normally found anywhere else. Many stands used to sell various snake delicacies and drinks, hence its nickname "Snake Alley".

Many Taiwanese have a negative view of Snake Alley, which was once a legal red-light district.

== History ==
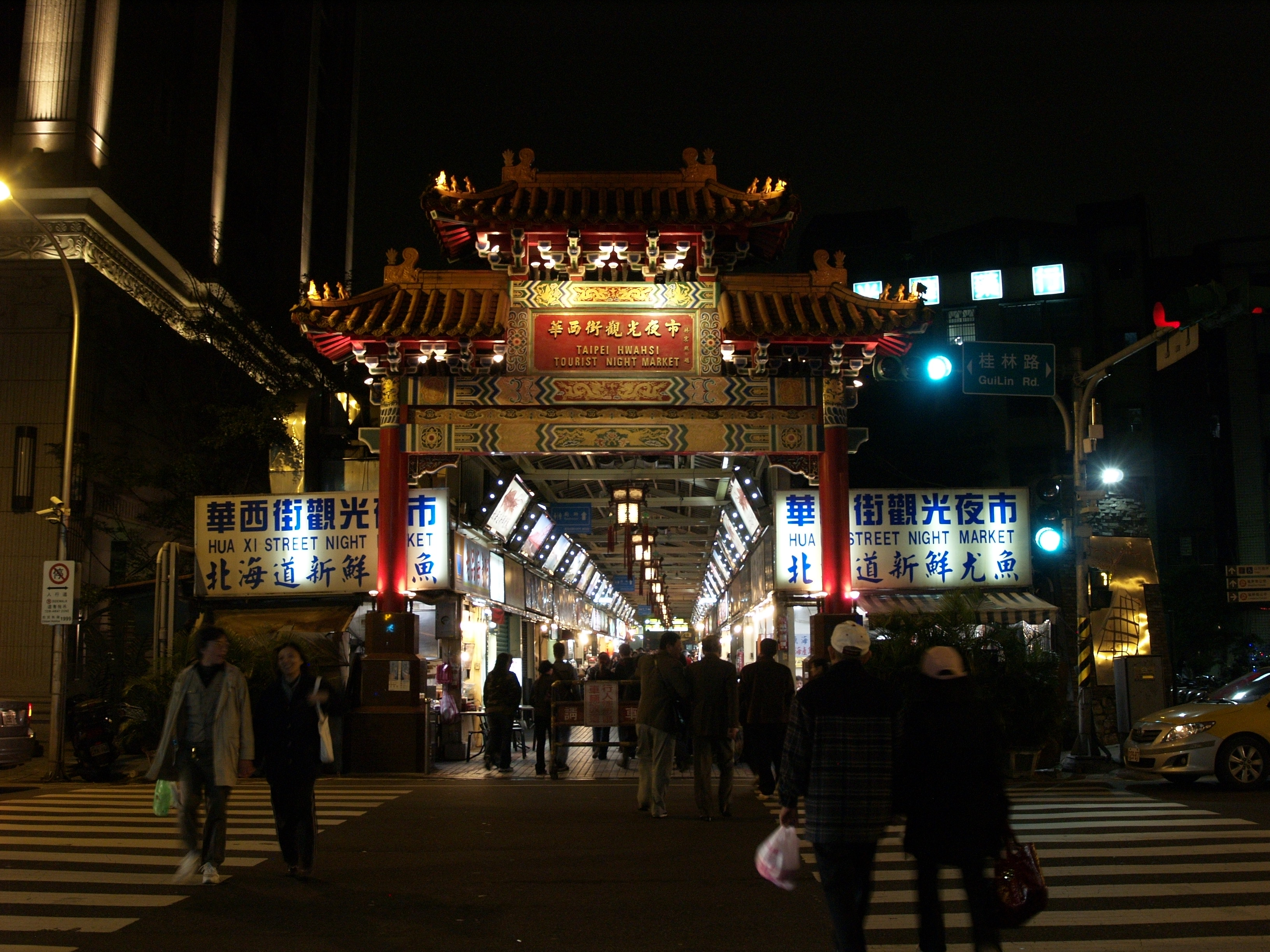
Snake Alley entrance

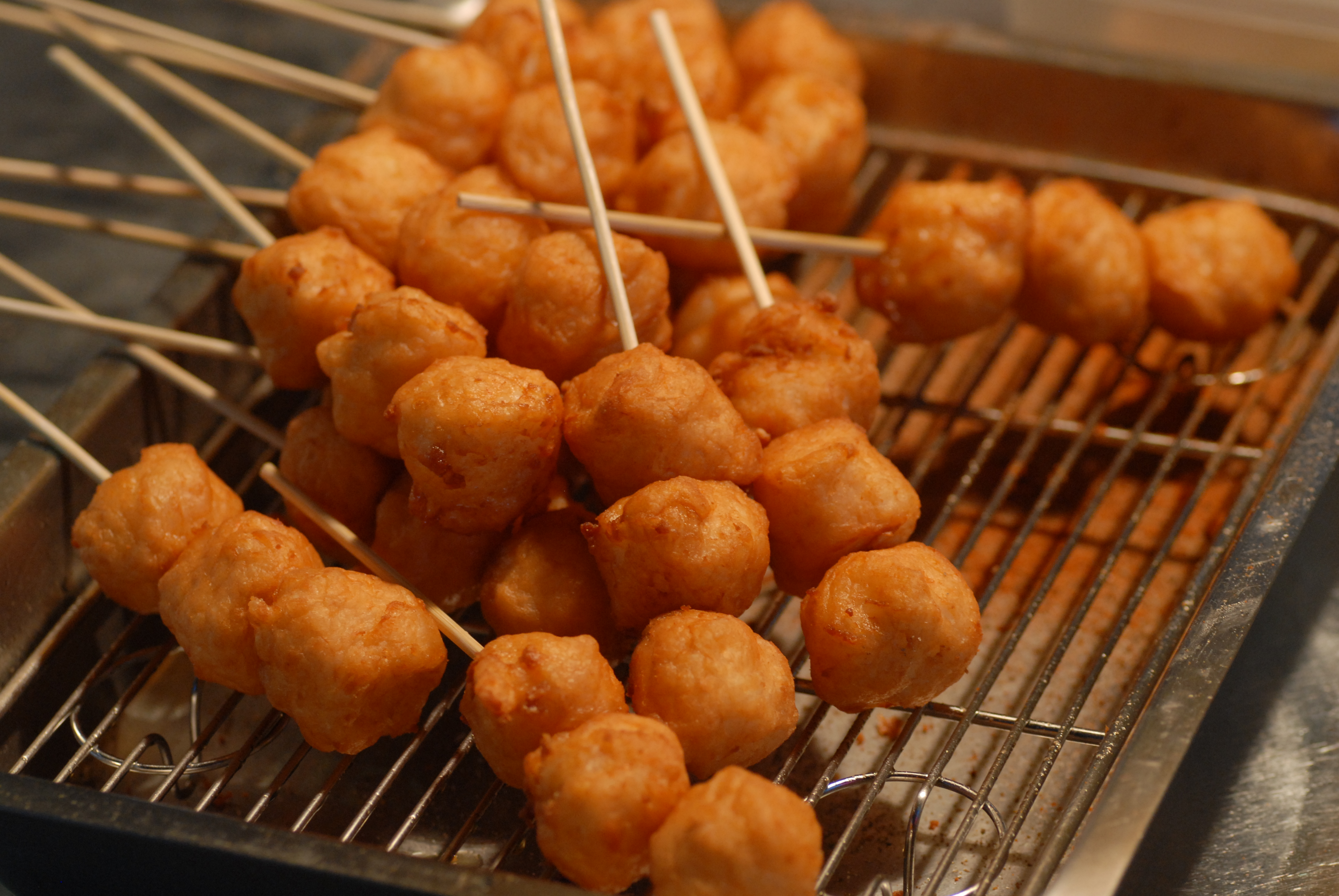
Food at the night market.

The Huaxi Street Night Market has a history of over 50 years. Until the 1990s, it was a red light district, with pornography shops and strippers congregating along the two sides of these streets. Prostitutes could be easily found in the brothels in the area, where they waited for customers in plain view. The Taiwanese government outlawed prostitution in 1991.

Snake Alley got its nickname due to the numerous restaurants serving snake meat in the past. Previously, snake-meat restaurants would get attention from passersby by putting on performances where handlers would kill and skin live snakes. However, the government banned performances in the 2000s, both to adhere with Article 13 of Taiwan's Animal Protection Act, as well as appease the public's growing concerns about animal welfare. The night market's last snake-meat restaurant, the Asia Snake Meat Store (Chinese: 亞洲蛇肉店), closed on May 21, 2018.

Because of its various restaurants and food stalls, the night market has been recognized by the Michelin Guide. In its 2019 Michelin Guide to Taipei, the guide gave the entire night market the Bib Gourmand. In August 2020, food vendor Wu Huang-yi, who sells gua bao at his food stall in the night market, also received a Bib Gourmand.

== Transportation ==
The night market is 500 meters (1650 feet) northwest of Exit 1 of the Longshan Temple Station of the Taipei Metro.

== See also ==
- List of night markets in Taiwan
- Wang's Broth
