= Wanhua Lin Mansion =

Former residence in Wanhua, Taipei, Taiwan

- 萬華林宅
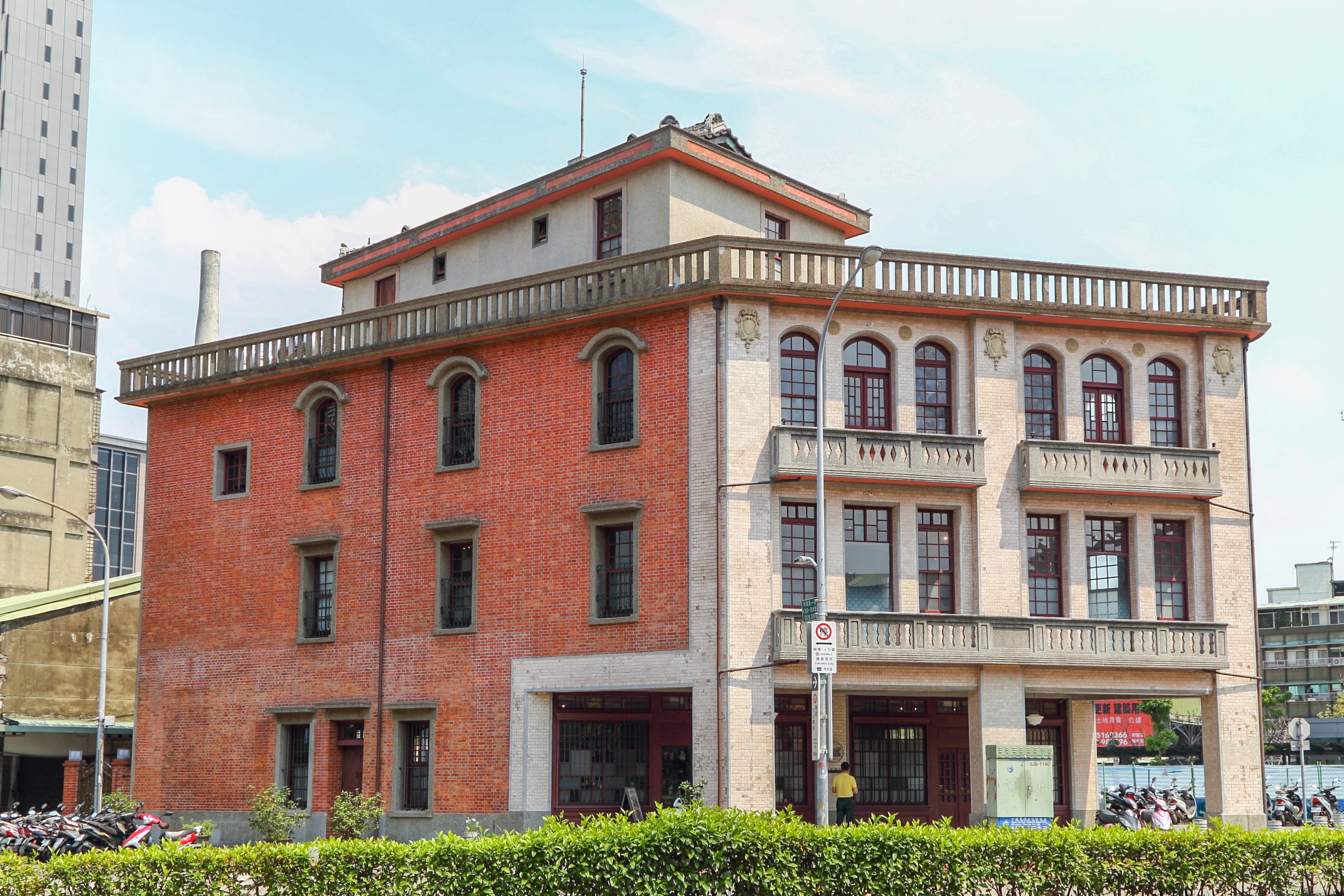
- Interactive map of the Wanhua Lin Mansion area

General information
- Type: mansion
- Location: Wanhua, Taipei, Taiwan
- Coordinates: 25°02′00.7″N 121°29′54.5″E
- Construction started: 1932
- Completed: 1935
- Opened: April 2016
- Inaugurated: 27 May 2016

Technical details
- Floor count: 4

Design and construction
- Architect: Lin Hong-ma

Website
- Official website

The Wanhua Lin Mansion (traditional Chinese: 萬華林宅; simplified Chinese: 万华林宅; pinyin: Wànhuá Lín Zhái) is a historic mansion in Wanhua District, Taipei, Taiwan.

== History ==
The construction of the mansion started in 1932 and completed in 1935. It used deep foundation and reinforced concrete in its construction process with cement supplied by Asano Cement and discarded railway tracks. In 2013, the building was leased to cultural and creative activities under the Urban Regeneration Office and became the venue for toy exhibition. It was then undergone renovation and finally was opened to the public in April 2016. It was inaugurated by Taipei Mayor Ko Wen-je on 27 May 2016.

== Architecture ==
The mansion is a 4-story building with quadrangular shape. The exterior wall is a mix of biscuit porcelain and Japanese red bricks with several rectangular and arched windows. At the top most floor lies the prayer hall designed with Chinese, Japanese and western architectural styles.

== Exhibitions ==
The ground floor of the building is a café. The third and fourth floors are the gallery about artifacts, documents, tools and photos from the Lin family.

== Transportation ==
The mansion is accessible within walking distance west of Wanhua Station of Taiwan Railway.

== See also ==
- List of tourist attractions in Taiwan
