= Longshan Temple metro station =

Metro station in Taipei, Taiwan

Longshan Temple (Bangka Commercial Zone) 龍山寺 （艋舺商圈）
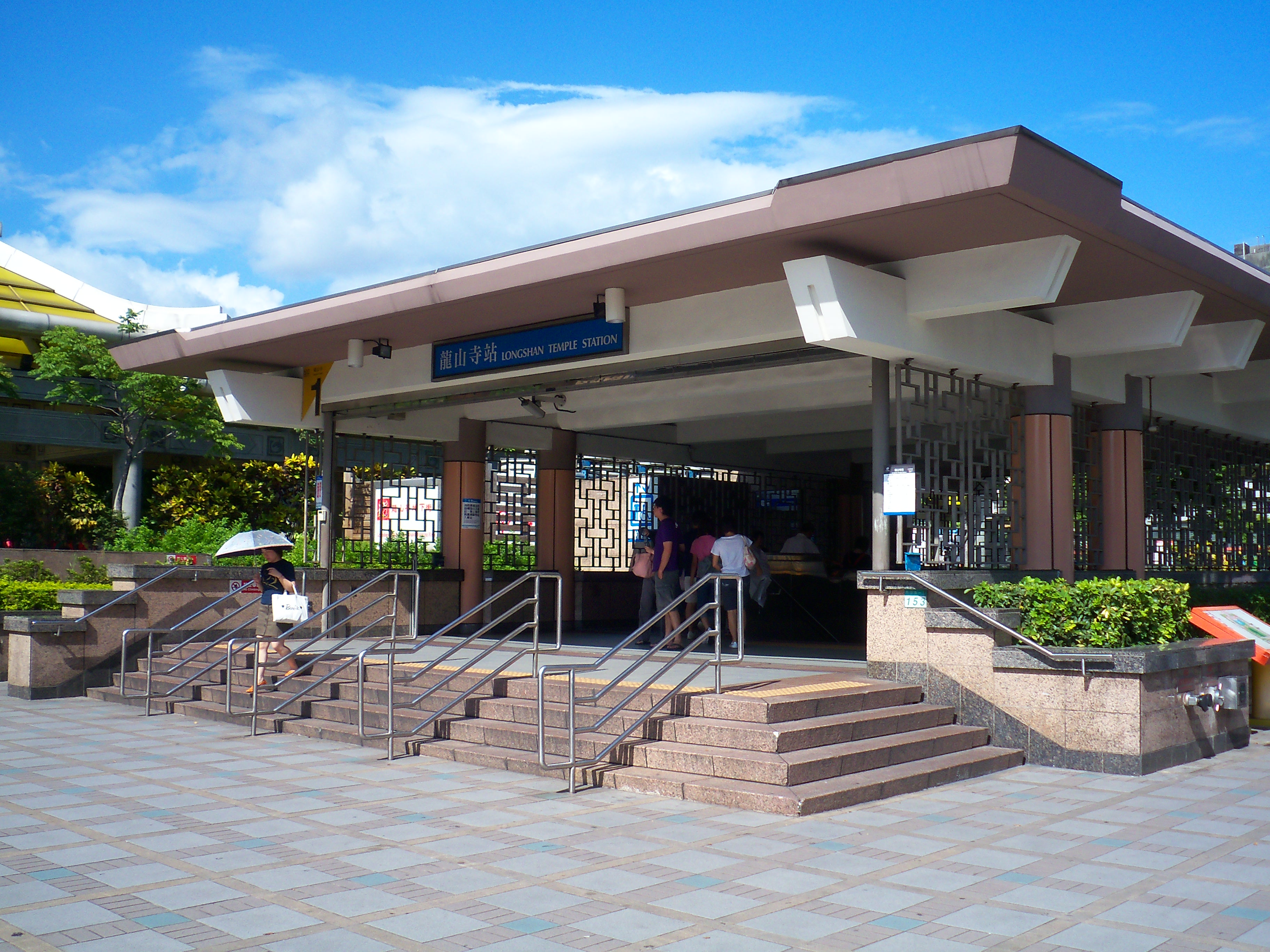
- Entrance 1

Chinese name
- Traditional Chinese: 龍山寺 (艋舺商圈)
- Simplified Chinese: 龙山寺 (艋舺商圈)
Transcriptions
Standard Mandarin
- Hanyu Pinyin: Lóngshān Sì (Měngjiǎ Shāngqquān)
- Bopomofo: ㄌㄨㄥˊ ㄕㄢ ㄙˋ (ㄇㄥˇㄐㄧㄚˇㄕㄤ ㄑㄩㄢ)
- Wade–Giles: Lung²-shan¹ Ssu⁴ (Meng³-chia³ Shang¹-ch'uan¹)
Hakka
- Pha̍k-fa-sṳ: Liùng-sân-sṳ̀
Southern Min
- Tâi-lô: Liông-san-sī (Báng-kah siong-khuan)

General information
- Location: 153 Sec 1 Xiyuan Rd; Wanhua, Taipei; Taiwan
- Coordinates: 25.0352°N 121.5004°E
- System: Taipei metro station
- Connections: 200 m: Taiwan Railways (101 Wanhua)

Construction
- Structure type: Underground
- Cycle facilities: Access available

Other information
- Station code: BL10
- Website: web.metro.taipei/e/stationdetail2010.asp?ID=BL10-085

History
- Opened: 1999-12-24

Passengers
- 2017: 21.081 million per year ▲3.33%
- Rank: (Ranked 20 of 119)

Services
Preceding station	Taipei Metro	Following station
Jiangzicui towards Dingpu	Bannan line	Ximen towards Nangang Exhib Center
Preceding station	Taiwan Railway	Following station
Taipei towards Keelung	Western Trunk line transfer at Wanhua	Banqiao towards Kaohsiung
Location

Longshan Temple (Bangka Commercial Zone) (Chinese: 龍山寺 (艋舺商圈)), formerly transliterated as Lungshan Temple Station until 2003, is a metro station in Taipei, Taiwan served by Taipei Metro. It is a station on Bannan line. The station is named for the nearby Lungshan Temple.

== Station overview ==
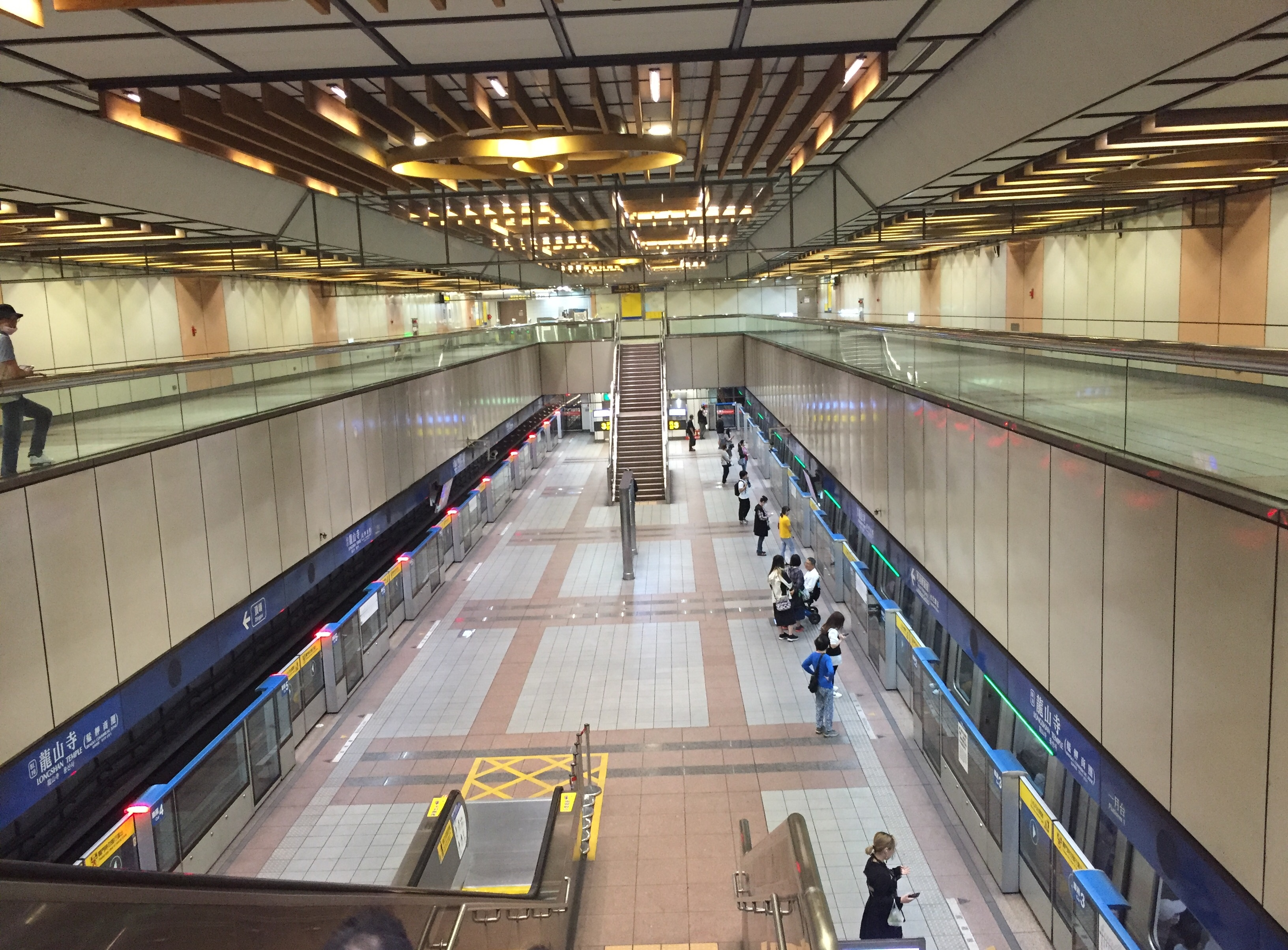
Longshan Temple platform

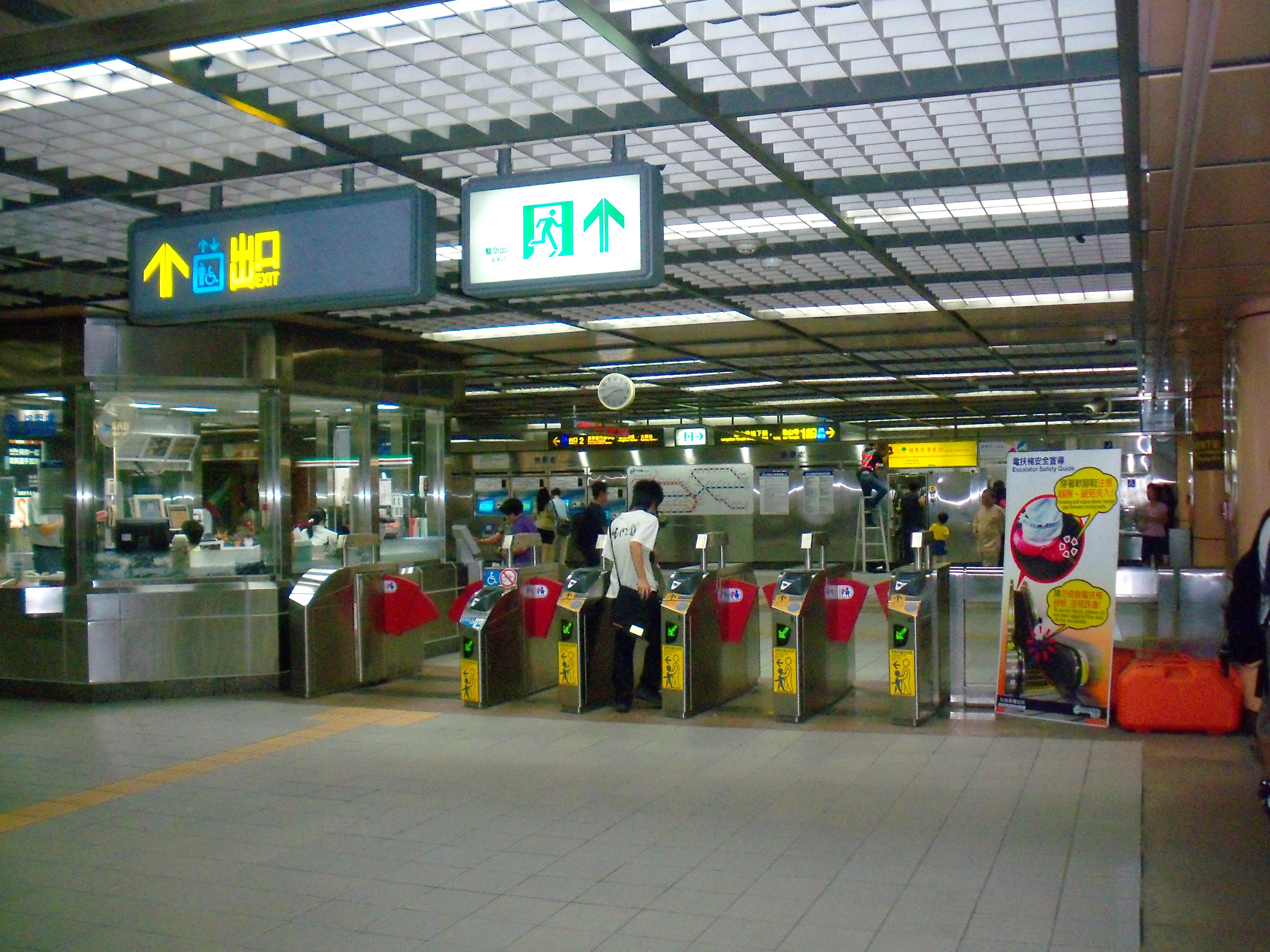
Longshan Temple concourse

This is a two-level, underground station with an island platform and three exits. The washrooms are located inside the entrance area.

The station is located underneath Heping West Rd., between the intersections of Heping West Rd. with Xiyuan Rd. and Kangding Rd.

The Taiwan Railway Wanhua Station is within walking distance and approximately 150 meters south of the Metro station.

== Station layout ==
Street level	Ground level	Entrance/exit
B1	Concourse	Lobby, automatic ticket dispensing machine, information desk, one-way faregates Restrooms (north side, inside fare zone)
B2	Platform 1	← Bannan line toward Nangang Exhib Center / Kunyang (BL11 Ximen)
B2	Island platform, doors will open on the left
B2	Platform 2	→ Bannan line toward Dingpu / Far Eastern Hospital (BL09 Jiangzicui) →

== Around the station ==
- Bangka Park (next to the station)
  - Longshan Temple Underground Shopping Mall
- Bopiliao Historic Block
- Heritage and Culture Education Center of Taipei City (300m northeast of Exit 3)
- Huannan Market (1.3km southwest of Exit 1)
- Sugar Refinery Cultural Park (650m southwest of Exit 2)
