= Bopiliao Historic Block =

Street in Wanhua, Taipei, Taiwan

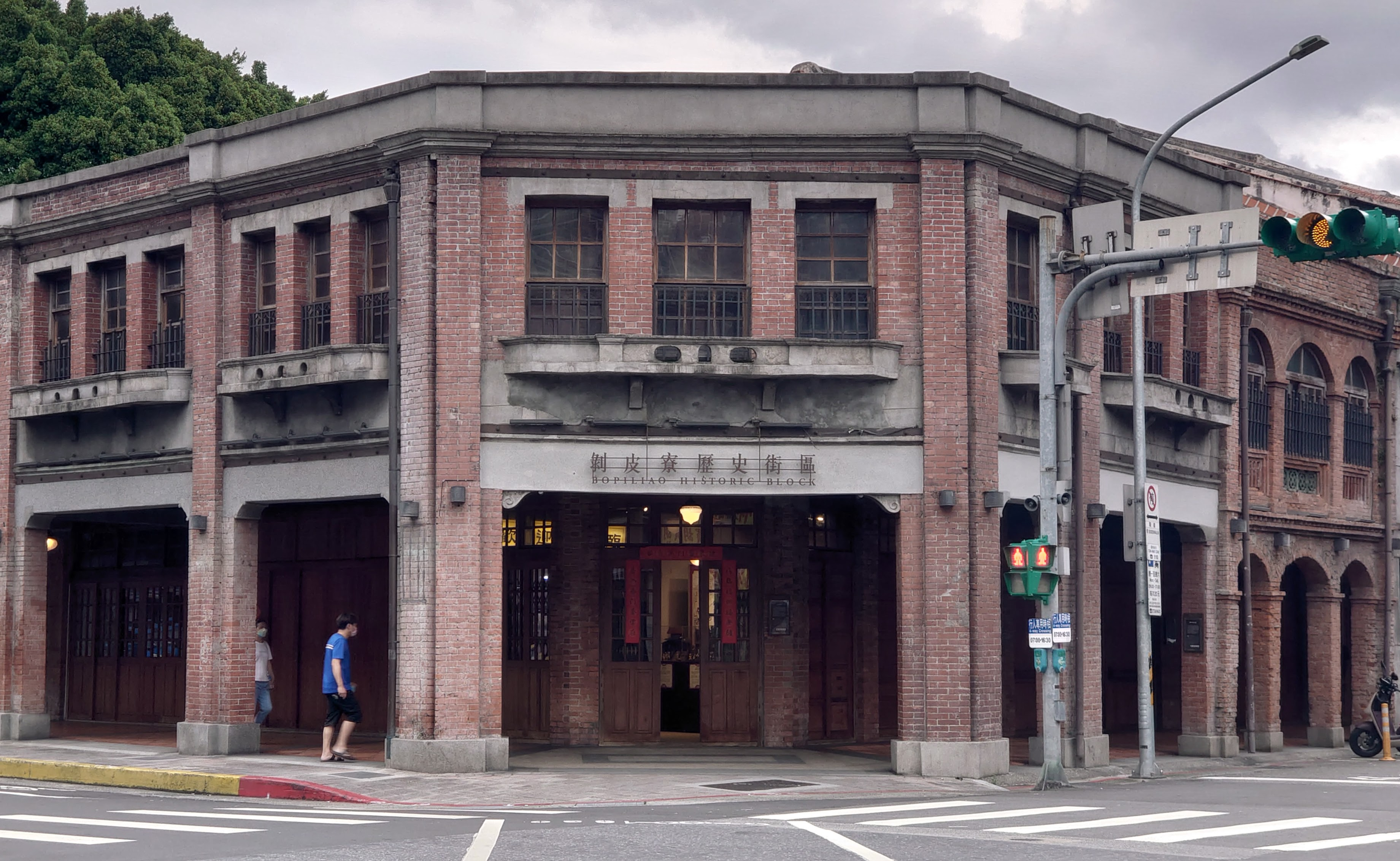

- Location within Taiwan
- Native name: 剝皮寮 (Chinese)
- Type: Street
- Addresses: Lane 173, Kangding Street, Wanhua District
- Location: Wanhua, Taipei, Taiwan
- Coordinates: 25.03693°N 121.50214°E

Other
- Website: www.bopiliao.taipei

The Bopiliao Historic Block (Chinese: 剝皮寮; pinyin: Bōpílíao; Pe̍h-ōe-jī: Pak-phê-liâu) is a historic street in Wanhua, Taipei, Taiwan. The block is made almost completely of one or two story brick buildings, many dating over 200 years ago and was one of the earliest commercial districts in northern Taiwan. The street houses museums, shops, food options, and art exhibitions.

== History ==
The Bopiliao Historic Block, originating in the early Qing Dynasty, stands as a testament to centuries of development in Taipei City's Wanhua District. Over time, it has witnessed the influence of different historical periods, including the Qing Dynasty, Japanese, and Republic of China eras, resulting in a blend of architectural styles.

Initially known by various names, the settlement evolved into its current form. However, urban development initiatives during Japanese rule altered the area's layout, leading to a decline in its commercial vitality. Despite this, the distinctive architectural features, such as the red-brick shophouses and Western-style buildings, remain.

Preserved within the district are unique spaces, including a plaza with a fire-fighting reservoir and a trapezoidal plaza created during the Japanese era. In 1941, plans to establish Laosong Elementary School inadvertently preserved the area's architectural diversity.

In 1999, the Taipei City Government initiated efforts to restore and revitalize the abandoned space. Subsequent restoration work, completed in 2009, transformed the area into a cultural hub, attracting attention from society. The release of the movie "Monga" further heightened interest in the community.

In 2010, the Taipei City Government officially recognised Bopiliao as a historic site, delineating its boundaries within the Wanhua District. To enhance its appeal, the block was divided into east and west sides, each with distinct development strategies.

Today, the Bopiliao Historic Block hosts art exhibitions, film promotions, and cultural heritage education programmes, aiming to offer visitors a rich and immersive experience that celebrates its unique charm and blends old traditions with new trends.

== Transportation ==
The historial site is accessible by the Longshan Temple Station on the Bannan line of Taipei Metro.

== See also ==
- Dadaocheng
- List of roads in Taiwan
- List of tourist attractions in Taiwan
