= Wanhua District =

District of Taipei, Taiwan

Coordinates: 25.0333°N 121.483°E

Wanhua 萬華區
- District
- Wanhua District
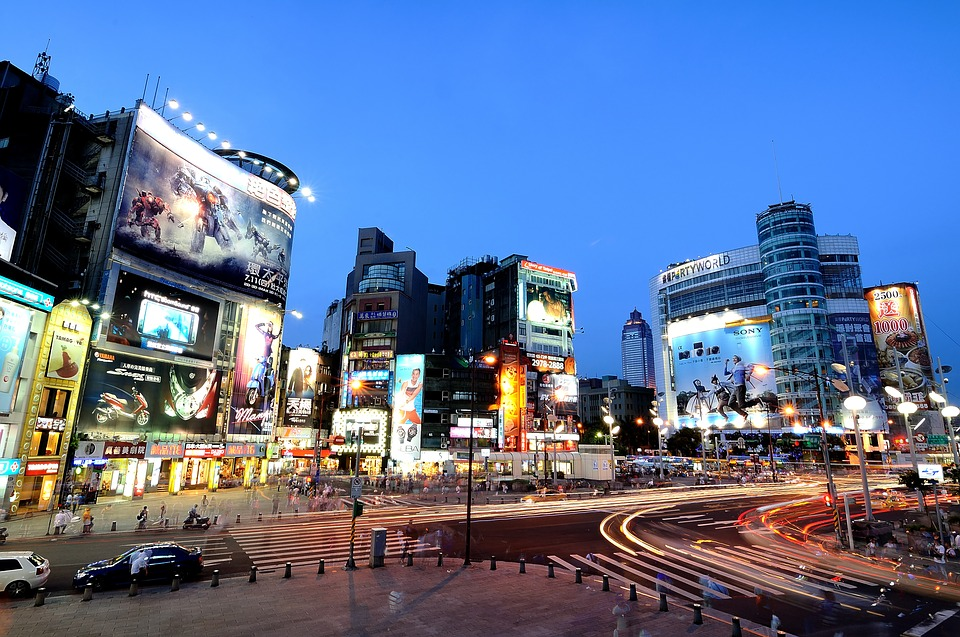
- Ximending (Hsimenting) (西門町)

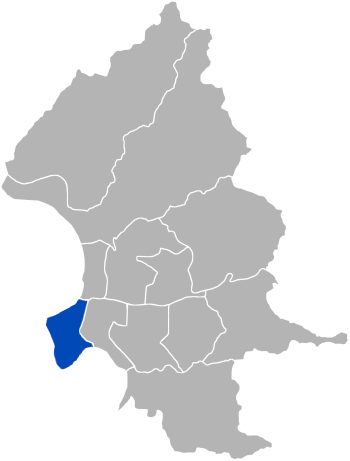
- Wanhua District in Taipei City
- Country: Republic of China (Taiwan)
- Region: Western Taipei
- Divisions: List: 36 villages; 720 neighborhoods

Area
  - Total: 8.8522 km^{2} (3.4179 sq mi)
  - Rank: Ranked 10th of 12

Population (January 2023)
  - Total: 173,209
  - Rank: Ranked 9th of 12
  - Density: 19,567/km^{2} (50,678/sq mi)
- Postal code: 108
- Website: whdo.gov.taipei (in Chinese)

Wanhua District
- Traditional Chinese: 萬華區
- Simplified Chinese: 万华区
Transcriptions
Standard Mandarin
- Hanyu Pinyin: Wànhuá Qū
- Bopomofo: ㄨㄢˋㄏㄨㄚˊㄑㄩˉ
- Wade–Giles: Wan-hua Chü
Hakka
- Romanization: Van-faˇ-kiˊ
Southern Min
- Hokkien POJ: Bān-huâ-khu
- Tâi-lô: Bān-hôa-khu

Bangka / Monga (native name)
- Chinese: 艋舺
Transcriptions
Standard Mandarin
- Hanyu Pinyin: Měngjiǎ
Southern Min
- Hokkien POJ: Báng-kah

Wanhua District (Chinese: 萬華區; pinyin: Wànhuá Qū), known in Taiwanese Hokkien as Báng-kah khu (Chinese: 艋舺區) and historically as "Monga" or "Monka", is a district in Taipei, Taiwan. It is Taipei's oldest district. The district is home to historic buildings such as the Bangka Lungshan Temple and the Red House Theater.

Wanhua was the first district in Taipei to undergo economic development; many of the buildings and cultural sites in the region are older than those in surrounding districts. A large number of temples in Wanhua are attributed with originating from the Qing era.

Wanhua District is divided up into 36 villages (里) and 722 neighborhoods (鄰). In recent years, the population in the district has been in decline. It also has a higher concentration of mainlanders. Nevertheless, this district continues to be treasured by many as it is representative of some of Taipei's richest historical cultures – for example, the annual temple rituals held at Qingshan Temple, also known as the Qing Shan King Sacrificial Ceremony. This is a grand religious fiesta and celebration that involves a procession within Wanhua District for three consecutive nights.

== Etymology ==
Wanhua is the Mandarin Chinese pronunciation of Banka (Japanese: 萬華), a name coined by the Japanese because of its phonetic resemblance to the area's former name in Taiwanese Hokkien (Chinese: 艋舺; Pe̍h-ōe-jī: Báng-kah). Spellings used in English works circa 1900 include Banka, Manka and Bang-kah. The old Taiwanese Hokkien name possibly derives from bangka (bangka), the Austronesian word from one of the northern Formosan languages for a kind of "outrigger canoe". This is also attributed to the location of Wanhua, which is beside the Tamsui River and was once a prosperous trading port.

== History ==
=== Qing Dynasty ===
In the late Qing era, Hobe (modern-day Tamsui District) was the treaty port of northern Taiwan, whereas the trade was conducted at Bangka. Therefore, in 1862, the British Consulate succeeded in extending the limits of the port up the Tamsui River to include Banka, which was more than 10 miles (16 km) from the port. Bangka was the largest and most important city of northern Formosa, thoroughly Chinese, and, in the initial experience of missionary George Leslie Mackay, intensely anti-foreign.

=== Empire of Japan ===
In the early 20th century, with a population of about 27,000, Banka was Taiwan's third most populous city, following the nearby suburb of Daitōtei. Both cities were part of the Taihoku (Taipei) capital area but outside of the city proper, which was occupied mainly by the Japanese official class.

=== Republic of China ===
After the handover of Taiwan from Japan to the Republic of China in 1945, the area where Wanhua District covers now used to consist of Longshang District (龍山區) and Shuangyuan District (雙園區). In 1990, the two districts merged and formed Wanhua District.

== Tourism and shopping ==
Wanhua District can be divided into three sections: northern, central, and southern. The northern area, including Ximending, is popular for its large number of shopping centers - which makes it popular among the younger generation. Many historical sites are located in Central Wanhua, including Lungshan Temple, Qingshui Temple, Qingshan Temple and Bopiliao Historic Block. Southern Wanhua is mainly a residential area with a wide city park, also known as the Youth Park.

Night markets, a staple of Taiwanese culture, are widespread in the district and include the Huaxi Street Night Market, Xichang Street Night Market, Guangzhou Street Night Market, Wuzhou Street Night Market, and Nanjichang Night Market.

Huaxi Street Night Market is a two-block long night market located near Lungshan Temple. The market contains stands that serve local snacks, and restaurants that serve traditional Taiwanese dishes and uncommon delicacies such as: snake blood and meat, turtle blood and meat and deer penis wine. The area is also the site of Taipei's former red-light district. Prostitution was outlawed in the 1990s although prostitutes can still be readily found.

Huannan Market is also located in the district. The market is the biggest traditional market in Taipei. There, vendors sell produce, meats, seafood and cooked foods.

Other tourist attractions include the Heritage and Culture Education Center of Taipei City, Qingyunge Art, Wanhua Lin's Mansion and Ximending Mazu Temple.

== Education ==
=== Medical Institutions ===
- National Taiwan University Hospital, Bei-Hu Branch
- Taipei City Hospital, Chinese Medicine and Kunming Branches
- Renji Hospital
- Xiyuan Hospital
- Wanhua Hospital

=== High schools ===
- Huajiang Senior High School
- Dali Senior High School
- Liren Private High School

=== Junior high schools ===
- Wanhua Junior High School
- Shuangyuan Junior High School
- Longshan Junior High School
- Dali Junior High School
- Liren Private Junior High School

=== Elementary schools ===
- Xinhe Elementary School
- Shuangyuan Elementary School
- Dongyuan Elementary School
- Dali Elementary School
- Xiyuan Elementary School
- Wanda Elementary School
- Huajiang Elementary School
- Ximen Elementary School
- Laosong Elementary School
- Longshan Elementary School
- Fuxing Elementary School
- Guangren Elementary School

=== Other schools ===
- Taipei Korean Elementary School (타이뻬이한국학교)
- Wanhua Community College

== Transportation ==
Wanhua is served by Longshan Temple and Ximen metro stations of the Taipei Metro. The Taiwan Railway's Western Line has one station in the district, Wanhua Station.

Important roads, highways, and bridges include:

- Provincial Highway 1 (台一線): Zhongxiao Bridge, Zhongxiao Road West (忠孝橋、忠孝西路)
- Provincial Highway 3 (台三線): Huajiang Bridge, Heping W. Rd, Zhonghua Road (華江橋、和平西路、中華路)
- Zhongxing Bridge (中興橋)
- Wanban Bridge (萬板橋)
- Huacui Bridge (華翠大橋)
- Guangfu Bridge (光復橋)
- Huazhong Bridge (華中橋)

== Notable natives ==
- Hannah Quinlivan, actress and model
- Kingone Wang, actor, singer and host
- Lin Chia-lung, Mayor of Taichung (2014-2018)
- Yang Kuei-mei, actress
- Hong I-nan, poet and calligrapher

== See also ==
- District (Taiwan)
